= DA1 =

DA1 may refer to:

- DA postcode area (Dartford postcode area), a group of postal codes in England
- 3/15 DA-1, a BMW car model
- FN Mle DA1, a variant of M1918 Browning Automatic Rifle
- Davis DA-1, a light aircraft
- DA1, a model of Honda Integra
- DA1, a Eurofighter Typhoon variant
- DA1, a module code for the Dungeons & Dungeons adventure Adventures in Blackmoor
- Dragon Age: Origins, a 2009 video game
