= Honda Integra =

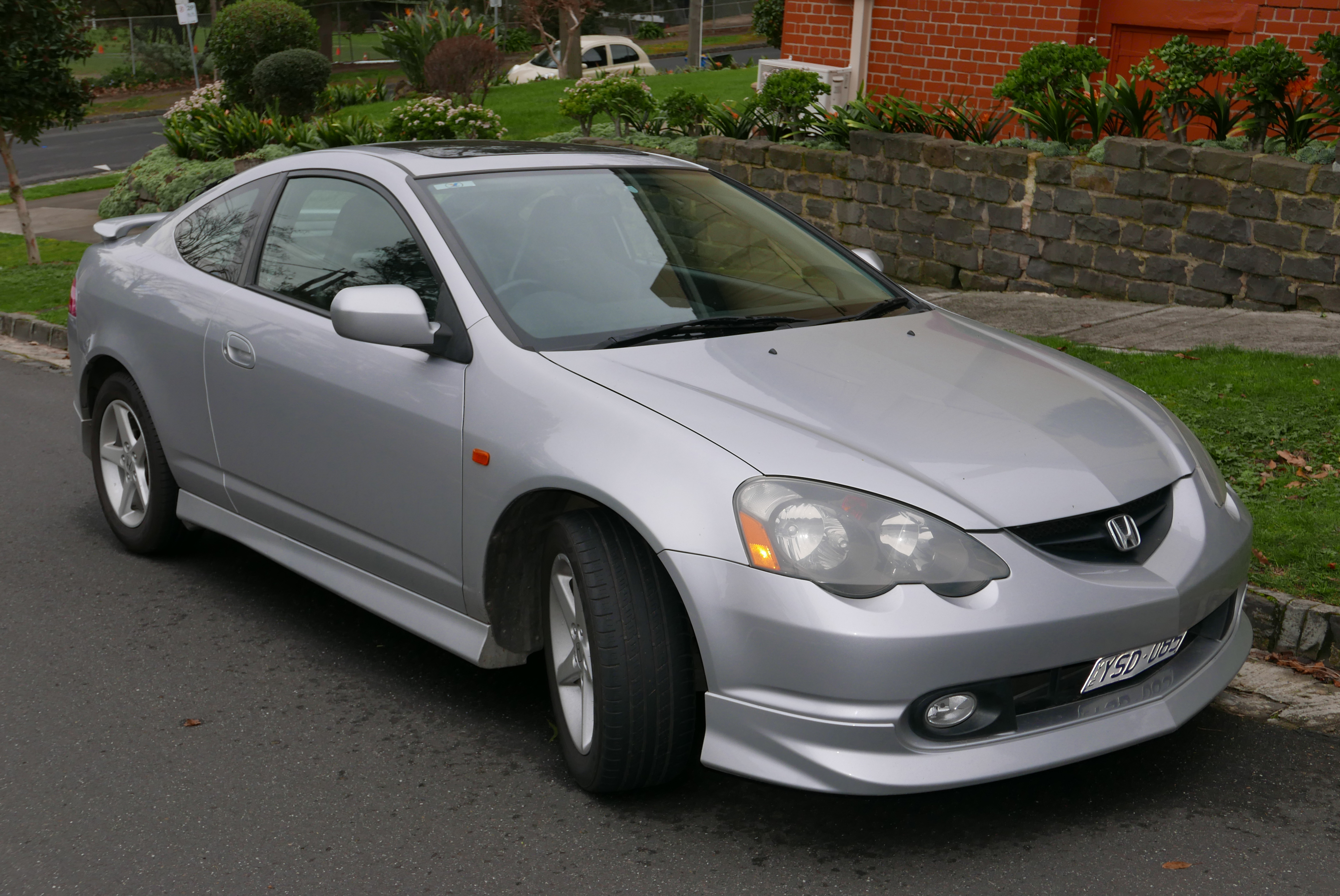
- 2002 Honda Integra Special Edition (DC5) in Australia.

Overview
- Manufacturer: Honda
- Also called: Honda Quint Integra (Japan, 1985–1989); Honda Civic (China, 2021–present); Acura Integra (US, Canada 1985–2001, 2022–present); Acura RSX (2002–2006); Rover 416i (1985–1989); Isuzu Vertex (Thailand)
- Production: 1985–2006; 2021–present (Chinese market: Honda Integra); 2022–present (North American and Japan markets)
- Model years: 1986–2006; 2023–present
- Assembly: Japan: Suzuka, Mie (Suzuka Plant, 1985–2006); China: Guangzhou (Guangqi Honda, 2021–present); United States: Marysville, Ohio (Marysville Auto Plant, 2022–present)

Body and chassis
- Class: Compact car (C)
- Body style: 3-door liftback coupé (1985–2006); 4-door sedan (1985–2001, 2021–present); 5-door liftback (1985–1989, 2022–present)
- Layout: Front-engine, front-wheel drive Front-engine, four-wheel drive

Chronology
- Predecessor: Honda Quint
- Successor: Acura RSX; Acura EL (Canada); Acura ILX (US/Canada)

The Honda Integra (Japanese: ホンダ インテグラ, Hepburn: Honda Integura), sold in North America as the Acura Integra and later the Acura RSX, is an automobile produced by the Japanese company Honda from 1985 until 2006, and then since 2021. It succeeded the Quint as a more luxurious and sport-oriented derivative of the Civic. The Integra was one of the launch models for Acura in the US in 1986 alongside the Acura Legend. Throughout its production run, the Integra was highly regarded for its handling and performance. The 1995–2001 Integra Type R is widely regarded as one of the best front-wheel-drive cars of all time.

The Integra nameplate was revived in 2021 after a 16-year hiatus. The Honda Integra nameplate is used for a restyled Honda Civic sedan for the Chinese market, while the Acura Integra nameplate is used for a Civic-based liftback for North America, replacing the Acura ILX.

== First generation (1985) ==
Series AV, DA1-DA4
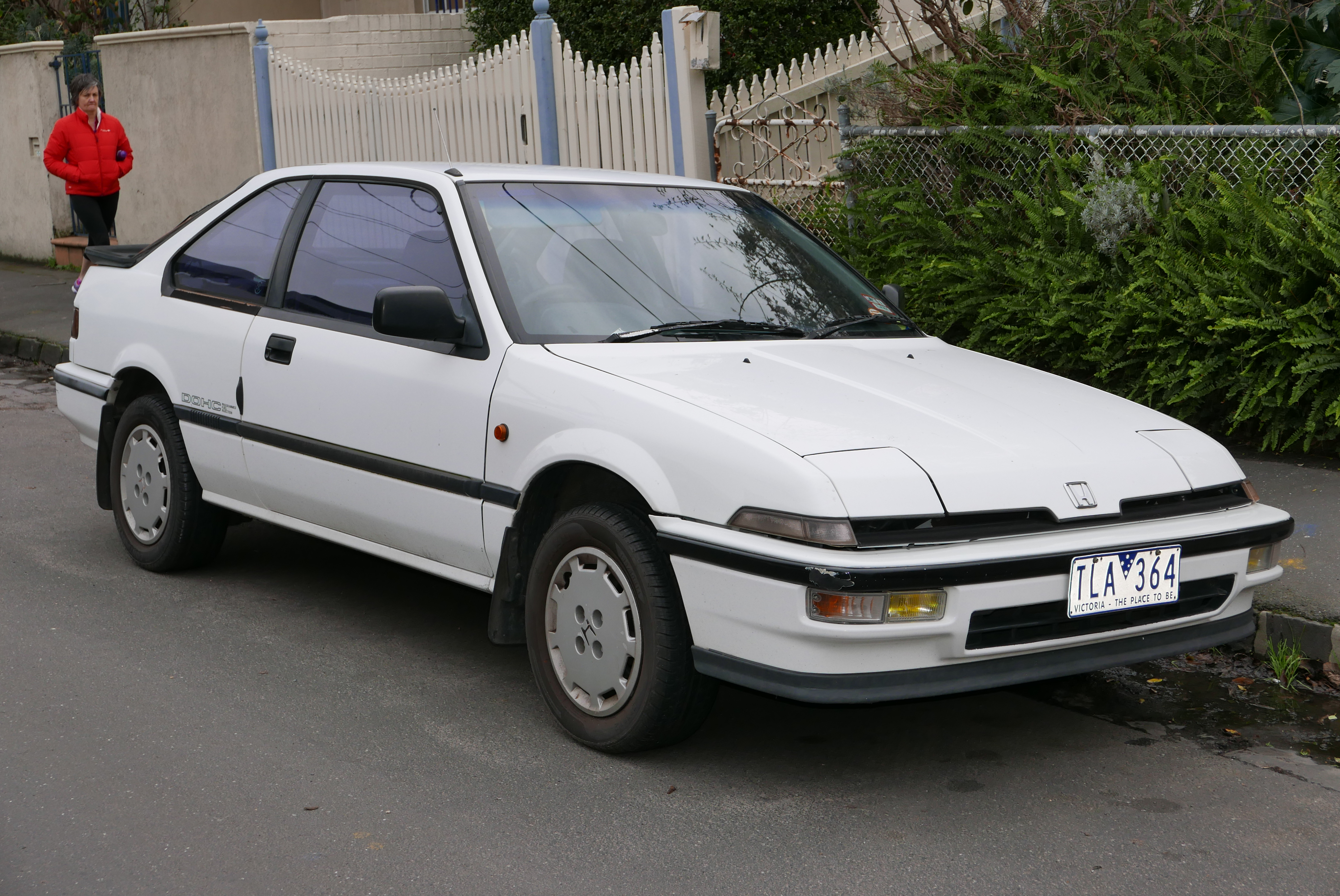
- 1989 Honda Integra (DA3, Australia)

Overview
- Also called: Honda Quint Integra; Acura Integra; Rover 416i
- Production: 1985–1989
- Model years: 1986–1989
- Assembly: Japan: Suzuka, Mie (Suzuka Plant)

Body and chassis
- Body style: 3-door liftback coupé 4-door sedan 5-door liftback
- Related: Honda Concerto

Powertrain
- Engine: 1.5 L EW5 (DA2); 1.6 L ZC (DA1 & DA3); 1.6 L D16A1 (DA1 & DA3); 1.5 L D15A1 (DA4)
- Transmission: 5-speed manual 4-speed automatic

Dimensions
- Wheelbase: 3-door: 2,450 mm (96.5 in); 4/5-door: 2,520 mm (99.2 in)
- Length: 3-door: 4,285 mm (168.7 in); 5-door: 4,355 mm (171.5 in); 4-door: 4,380 mm (172.4 in)
- Width: 1,665 mm (65.6 in)
- Height: 1,290 mm (50.8 in)

This vehicle debuted in Japan in February 1985 as the Honda Quint Integra, available only at Honda's Japanese dealership sales channel Honda Verno before going on sale a year later in North America as part of the then-new luxury Acura lineup. The three-door liftback was the only model available originally, with a five-door arriving in October 1985, and a four-door saloon bodystyle becoming available in Japan in the autumn of 1986. Only the liftback versions were sold in the U.S. A 1.6 L DOHC 16-valve four-cylinder engine powered most versions. The engine was the vehicle's most publicized feature, as DOHC, multi-valve engines were not commonplace in entry-level models at the time. In most European countries, only the five-door liftback was offered, as a replacement for the Honda Quint. Typically for European Integras, only the 1.5-liter 85 PS (63 kW; 84 hp) 4 Weber carburetors engine was available. The five-door liftback model was also sold in Australia rebadged as the Rover 416i. Except for in Britain, Honda did not offer the more powerful 1.6 DOHC fuel injection engine (in the UK known as the Integra EX16) in Europe. The ZC engine was also shared with the Honda Concerto, which was sold at newly established Japanese dealership sales channel called Honda Clio, which sold luxury oriented products like the Honda Legend.

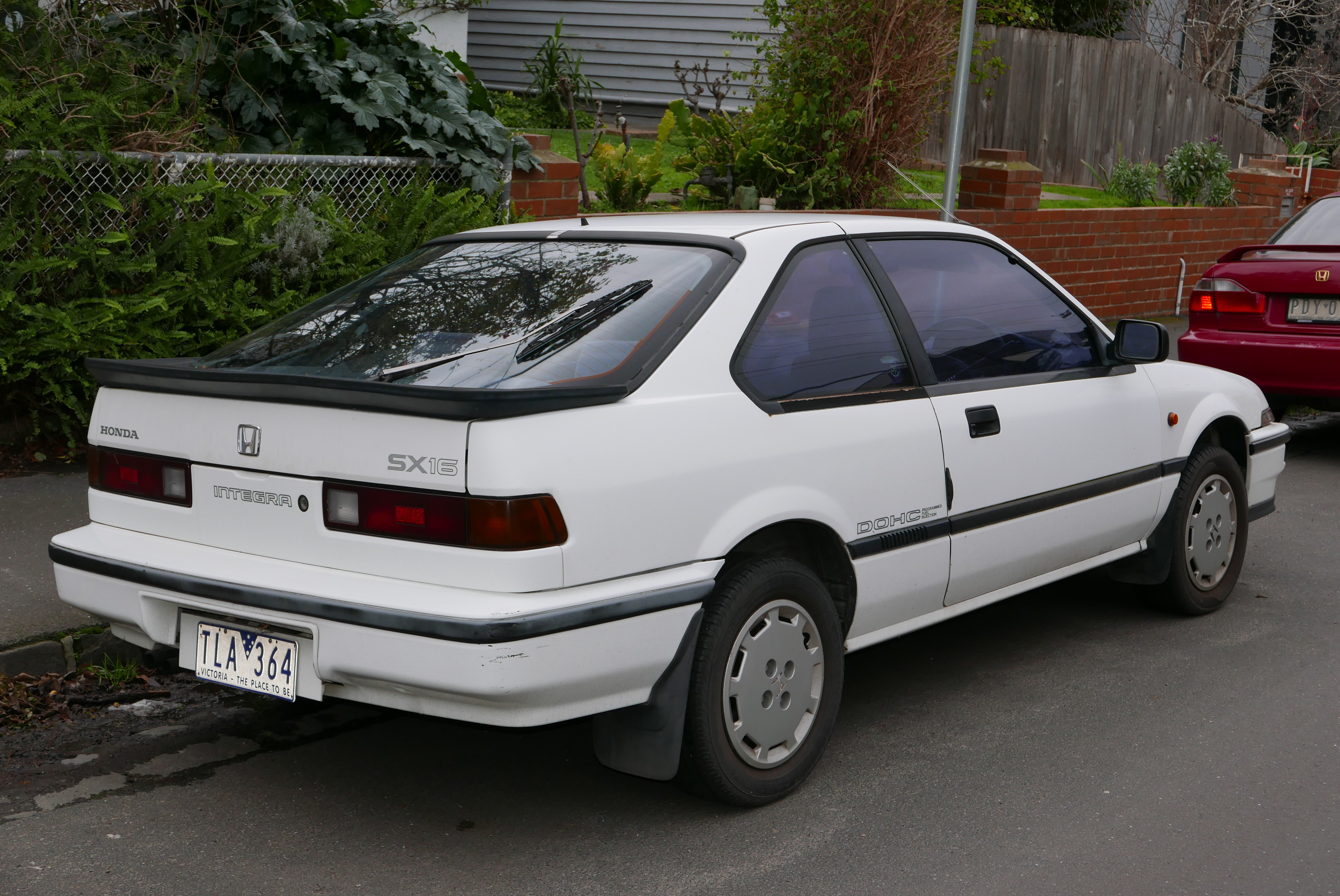
Honda Integra (DA3) SX16 3-door sport coupe (Australia)

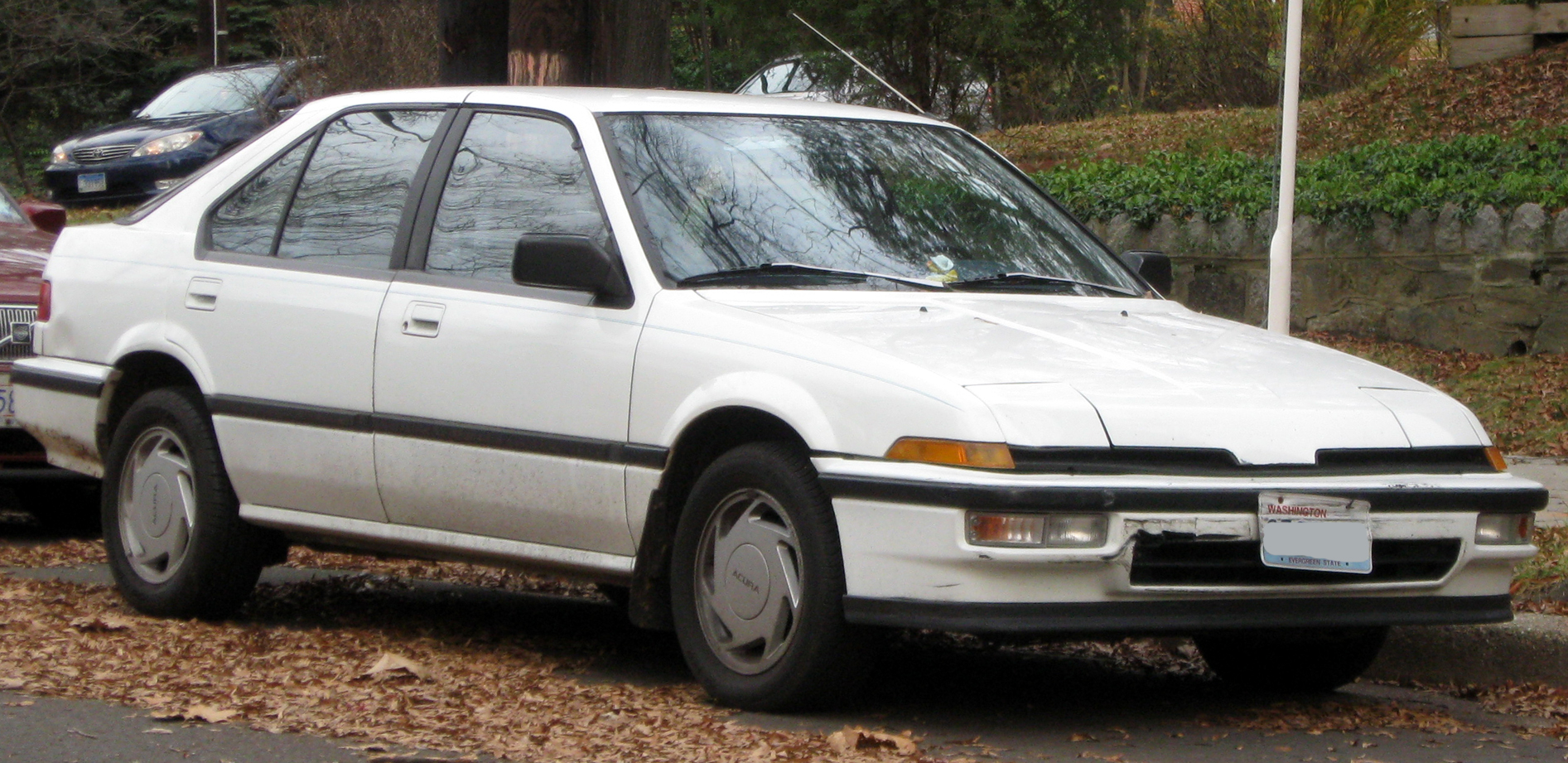
Acura Integra five-door (US)

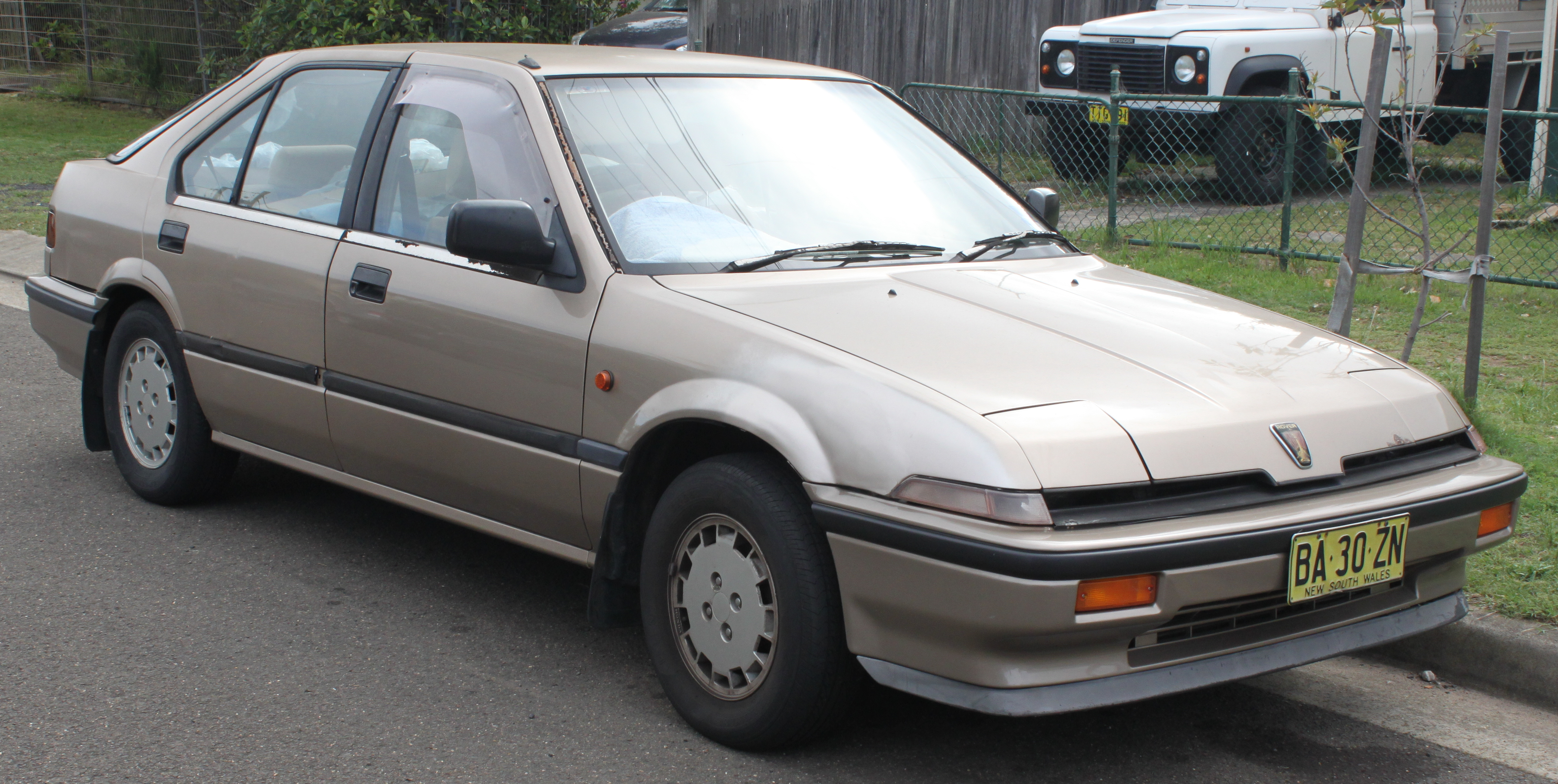
Rover 416i (Australia)

In Japan, while the VX- and RX-trimmed four-door (DA2) used the 1.5 L EW5 engine, all other model and trim combinations offered only the DOHC ZC engine, with a carburetor on GS, ZS, and LS trim packages, and PGM-FI on the top level GSi three- and five-door, and the RSi three-door trim package. Vehicles installed with a carburetor earned 15.4 km/L (44 mpg_{‑imp}; 36 mpg_{‑US}) in Japanese Government emissions tests and 115 PS (84.6 kW; 113.4 bhp), and 26 km/L (73 mpg_{‑imp}; 61 mpg_{‑US}) at consistent speeds above 60 km/h (37.3 mph). Vehicles with PGM-FI earned 14.4 km/L (41 mpg_{‑imp}; 34 mpg_{‑US}) in Japanese Government emissions tests with 135 PS (99.3 kW; 133.2 bhp), and 24.5 km/L (69 mpg_{‑imp}; 58 mpg_{‑US}) above 60 km/h (37.3 mph). In Japan, the Integra took the entry level marketing position at Honda Verno, below the sporty Prelude and larger, luxury focused Vigor.

Compared to the US, the European Integra was aimed downmarket and generally lacked equipment, with neither trim level (LX or EX) offering painted bumpers, central locking, power windows, nor air conditioning, even though a small number of fully equipped, left-hand drive fuel-injected Integras were sold in the Netherlands. The Integra EX16 did offer a sunroof, painted bumpers, a rear spoiler and Hi-Fi stereo equipment, but neither electric windows, central locking nor air conditioning were available. This was considered as a drawback to its European competitors such as the Peugeot 309 1.6 injection and the Renault 11 Turbo, that all could be equipped with comprehensive, albeit expensive, equipment. The first Integra never became as popular in Europe as it did in the US, but was praised by most motor magazines for its styling and overall road performance. The styling reflected the popularity of Honda's performance coupe, the Honda Verno sports coupe companion Honda Prelude, with the Integra offering a coupe for added cargo accommodation, and a slightly smaller appearance to the larger Honda Vigor. Largely unencumbered by emissions regulations, British market cars produce 85 PS (63 kW) in the 1.5 and 125 PS (92 kW) in the 1.6-liter EX16.

Being designed as the successor of the Honda Quint, the Integra is closely related to the Civic, although it featured a small list of key upgrades over its smaller stablemate to help merit a price increase over the CRX Si, which was otherwise the sportiest subcompact vehicle being offered by Honda Verno; enlarged 4-wheel disc brakes replaced the small front-disc/rear-drum setup used by the Civic and CRX, suspension calibration was re-worked, better tires were used and a 113-hp DOHC fuel-injected 16-valve engine was used in place of the SOHC unit from the CRX Si. Just like the Prelude and the Vigor of that period, the Integra featured sleek, sporty pop-up headlights, like its Japanese dealership Honda Verno stablemates, with the CRX adopting semi-concealed doors over the headlights. Nearly 228,000 units were sold during the four-year run of the first-generation model, most of them in the United States.

The first-generation Acura Integra came with 1.6-liter DOHC 16-valve 4-cylinder (D16A1) engine which received an update mid-cycle. The 86–87 engine is commonly called the "Browntop" while the 88–89 engines are referred to as the "Blacktop" due to the color of their valve covers. The improvements in the "blacktop" engine included lighter rods, domed pistons for slightly higher compression, and an electric advance distributor (the "browntop" came with a vacuum advance distributor). The overall gain in performance was about 5 hp (3.7 kW) for 118 hp (88.0 kW).

The Integra received a minor facelift in 1987 for the 1988 model year which featured slightly reshaped indicator lights, an improved climate control system and an update of the instrument clocks. In Europe, the Integra five-door Liftback was discontinued in October 1989 following the launch of the Rover-based Honda Concerto.

This was the only generation to offer 3-, 4-, and 5-door models. Production of the 5-door liftback ceased in 1988.

== Second generation (1989) ==
Series DA5-DA9, DB1-DB2
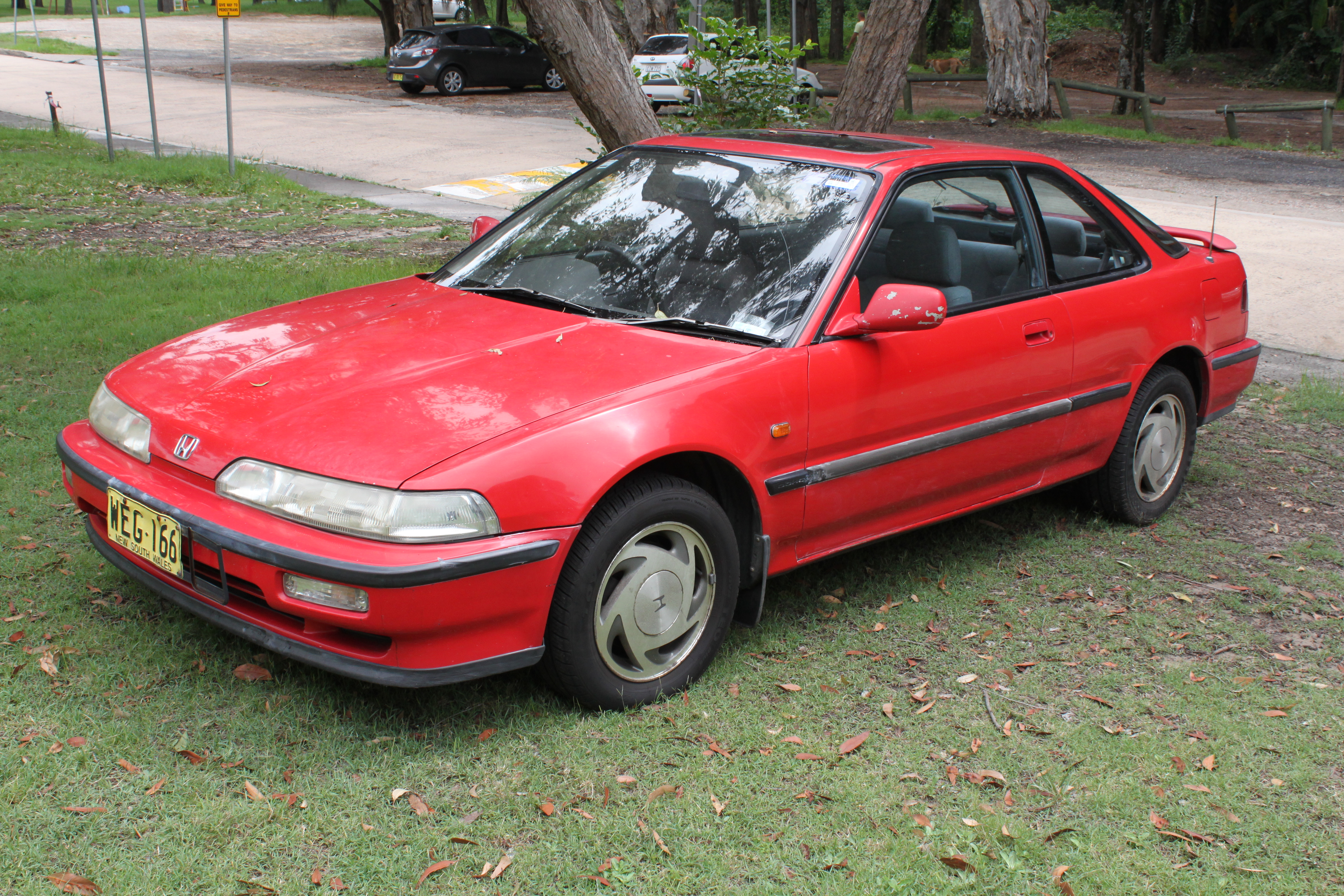
- 1992 Honda Integra LS (DA9, Australia)

Overview
- Production: 1989–1993
- Model years: 1990–1993
- Assembly: Japan: Suzuka, Mie (Suzuka Plant)

Body and chassis
- Body style: 3-door liftback coupé 4-door pillared hardtop sedan
- Related: Honda Civic; Honda Domani; Rover 400; Rover 200

Powertrain
- Engine: 1.6 L ZC (DA5/DA7); 1.6 L B16A (DA6/DA8); 1.7 L B17A1 (DB2); 1.8 L B18A1 (DA9/DB1)
- Transmission: 5-speed manual 4-speed automatic

Dimensions
- Wheelbase: Coupe: 2,550 mm (100.4 in); Sedan: 2,600 mm (102.4 in)
- Length: Coupe: 4,390 mm (172.8 in); Sedan: 4,485 mm (176.6 in)
- Width: 1990: 1,712 mm (67.4 in); 1991–92: 1,715 mm (67.5 in) (Japan only) 1,695 mm (66.7 in)
- Height: 1990 Coupe: 1,325 mm (52.2 in); 1990 Sedan: 1,340 mm (52.8 in); 1991–92 Hatchback: 1,270 mm (50.0 in); 1991–93 Sedan: 1,285 mm (50.6 in)
- Curb weight: 1,160–1,202 kg (2,557–2,650 lb)

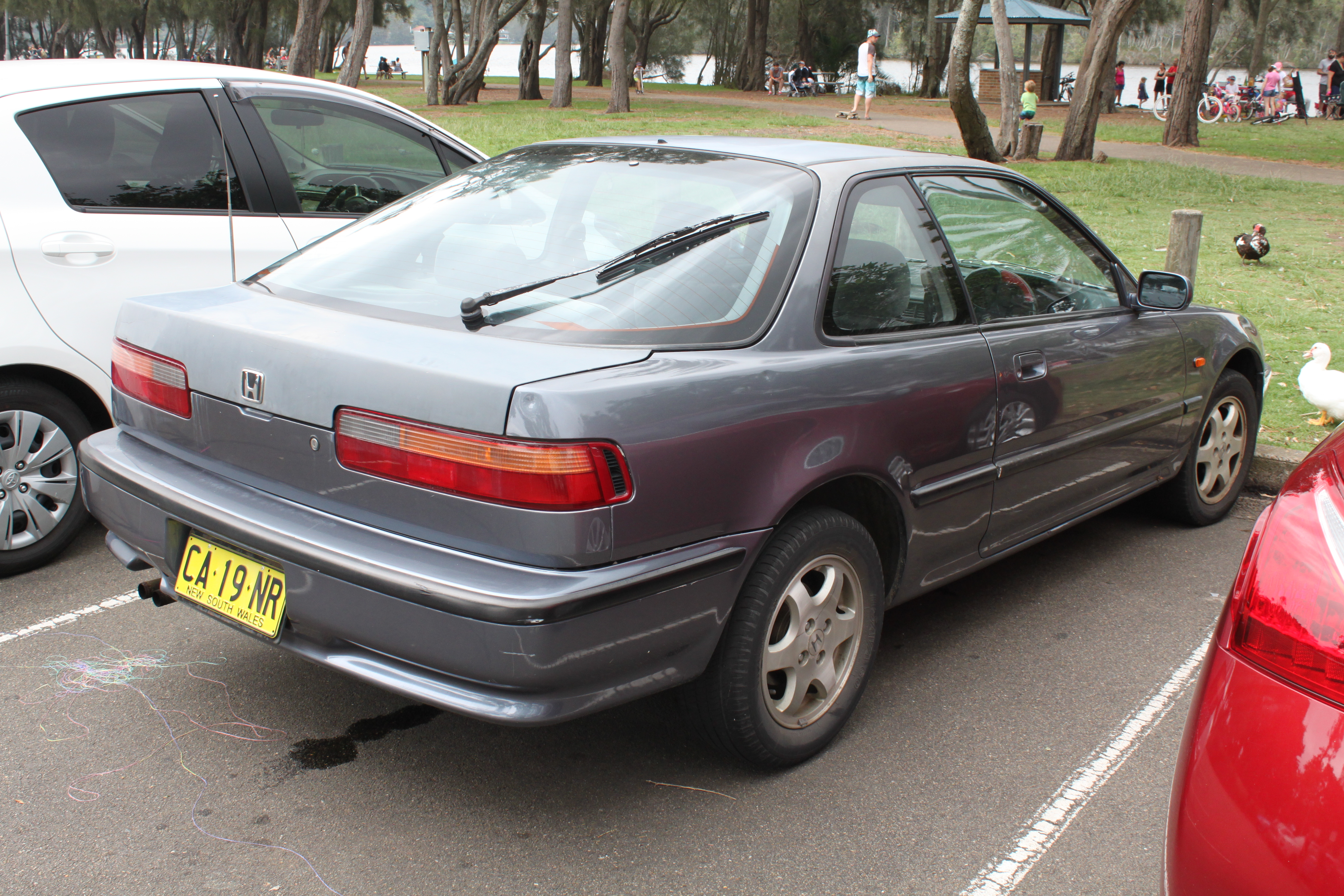
1993 Honda Integra LS Liftback (DA9, Australia)

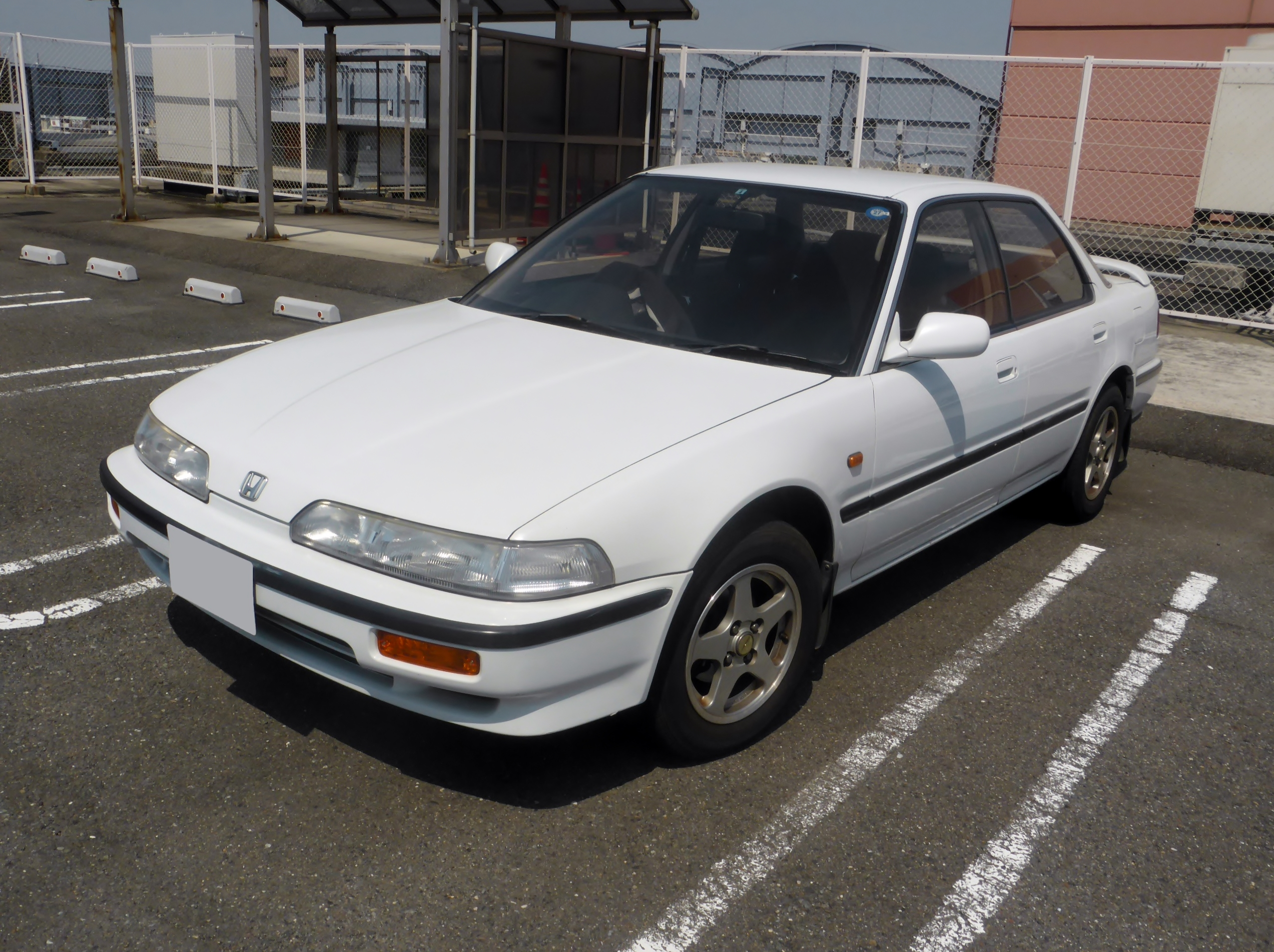
Honda Integra ZX Extra Sedan (DA7, Japan)

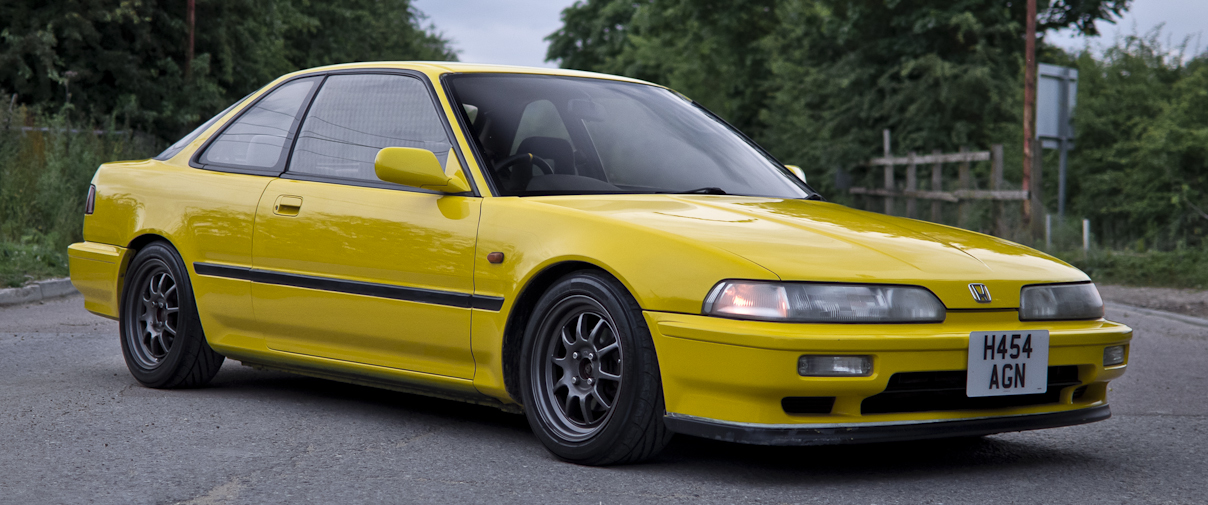
Honda Integra Liftback (DA5, UK)

An all new Integra was introduced in 1989. The second-generation Integra continued to be available as a hatchback coupe but also a new 4-door notchback is available instead of a 5-door hatchback. The Integra coupe has a wheelbase that is 3.9 in (99 mm) longer than the previous generation and weights approximately 190-235 lbs more depending on the model.

The second-generation Integra was introduced in April 1989, featuring the first VTEC engine ever manufactured by Honda (the B16A). For North America's GS-R, the B17A1 engine is a 1.7-liter DOHC VTEC 4-cylinder engine with a specific power output of 160 PS (118 kW; 158 hp) was available beginning with the 1992 model year. VTEC engagement is at 5,500 rpm on the B16A engine, redline for the XSi is 8,200 rpm. All Japanese models remained exclusive to Honda Japanese dealership network called Honda Verno.

There were two variants of the top DOHC VTEC model, the RSi, and the XSi. The RSi was the base model with a lighter weight thanks to wind-up windows, no rear spoiler and few options. Early RSi models also featured the S1 gearbox with slightly closer gear ratios than the Y1 gearbox fitted to the XSi. The XSi was the fully-optioned variant with climate control, optional sunroof, and anti-lock brakes. The XSi had a 0–100 km/h (62 mph) time of 7.2 seconds and can complete a standing quarter mile in 15.1 seconds. This top-spec DOHC VTEC model was complemented by more docile models that used dual-carburetor or PGM-Fi versions of the versatile 1.6-litre DOHC (ZC) engine but in the more compact SOHC configuration. Similarly there were base and full options variants of these SOHC engine Integras coded RX/RXi and ZX/ZXi respectively. All vehicles sold in Japan had their width dimensions slightly reduced so as to be in compliance with Japanese government regulations concerning exterior dimensions so that the car would be officially recognized as a "compact" and not incur yearly taxes for being wider. In October 1991, the range received a mild facelift. At the same time, a 1.8-liter version of the 4-door hardtop was made available in Japan. Called the ESi, it offered 140 PS (103 kW; 138 hp) at 6,300 rpm and was only available in conjunction with a 4-speed automatic transmission. At the same time, the VTEC was upgraded and now had 170 PS (125 kW; 168 hp).

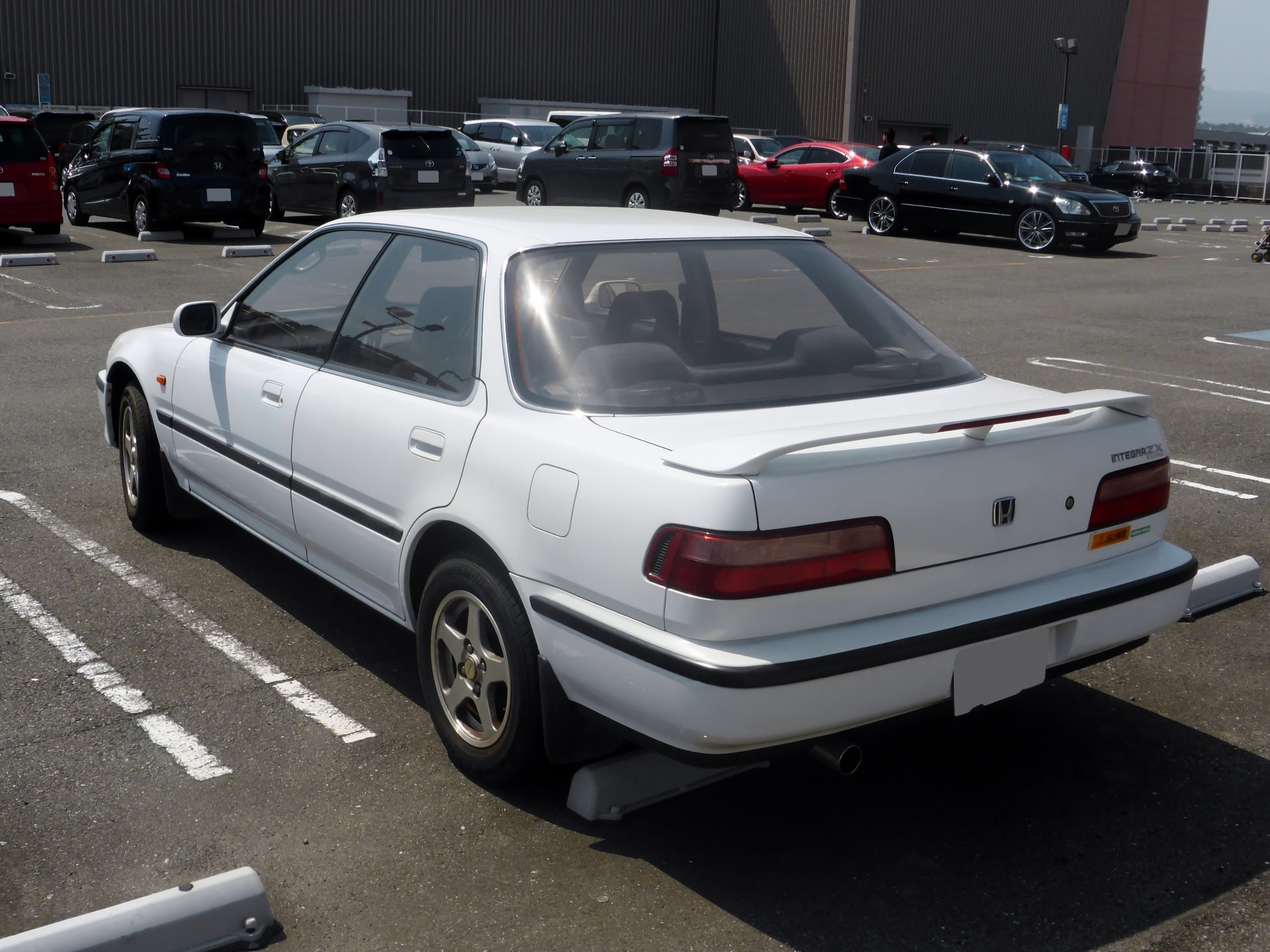
Honda Integra ZX Extra (DA7, Japan)

This generation saw the discontinuation of the 5-door liftback, and the first availability of a 4-door sedan outside Japan. The new hardtop bodystyle reflected a popular trend in Japan of offering an entry-level sedan, such as the Civic-based platform the Integra used, in a reduced-height 4-door hardtop. The Integra sedan saw competition from the similarly sized Toyota Corolla Ceres, the Toyota Sprinter Marino, the Nissan Presea, and the Mazda Lantis. The sedan was only styled to look like a hardtop. The vehicle retained the B-pillar, while the doors were constructed without window frames. This styling carried over to the third-generation sedan, and shared visual similarities to the Honda Verno larger companion, the Honda Vigor.

The then-Emperor of Japan, Akihito, until he discontinued driving shortly after his 85th birthday, maintained a gray 1991 Integra sedan with the 1.6 L engine, and regularly drove within the boundaries of the Imperial Palace.

=== North American market ===
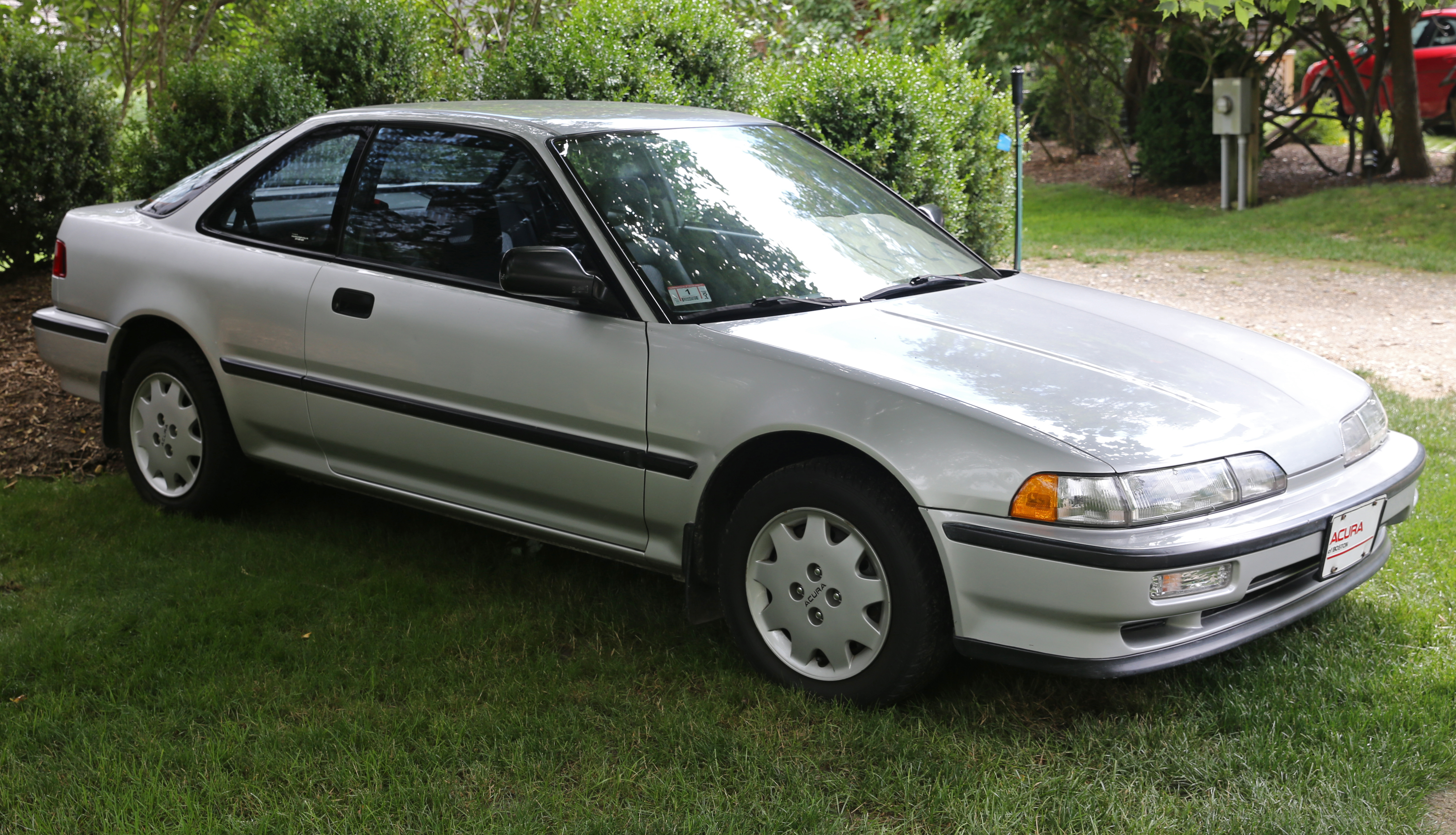
Acura Integra RS

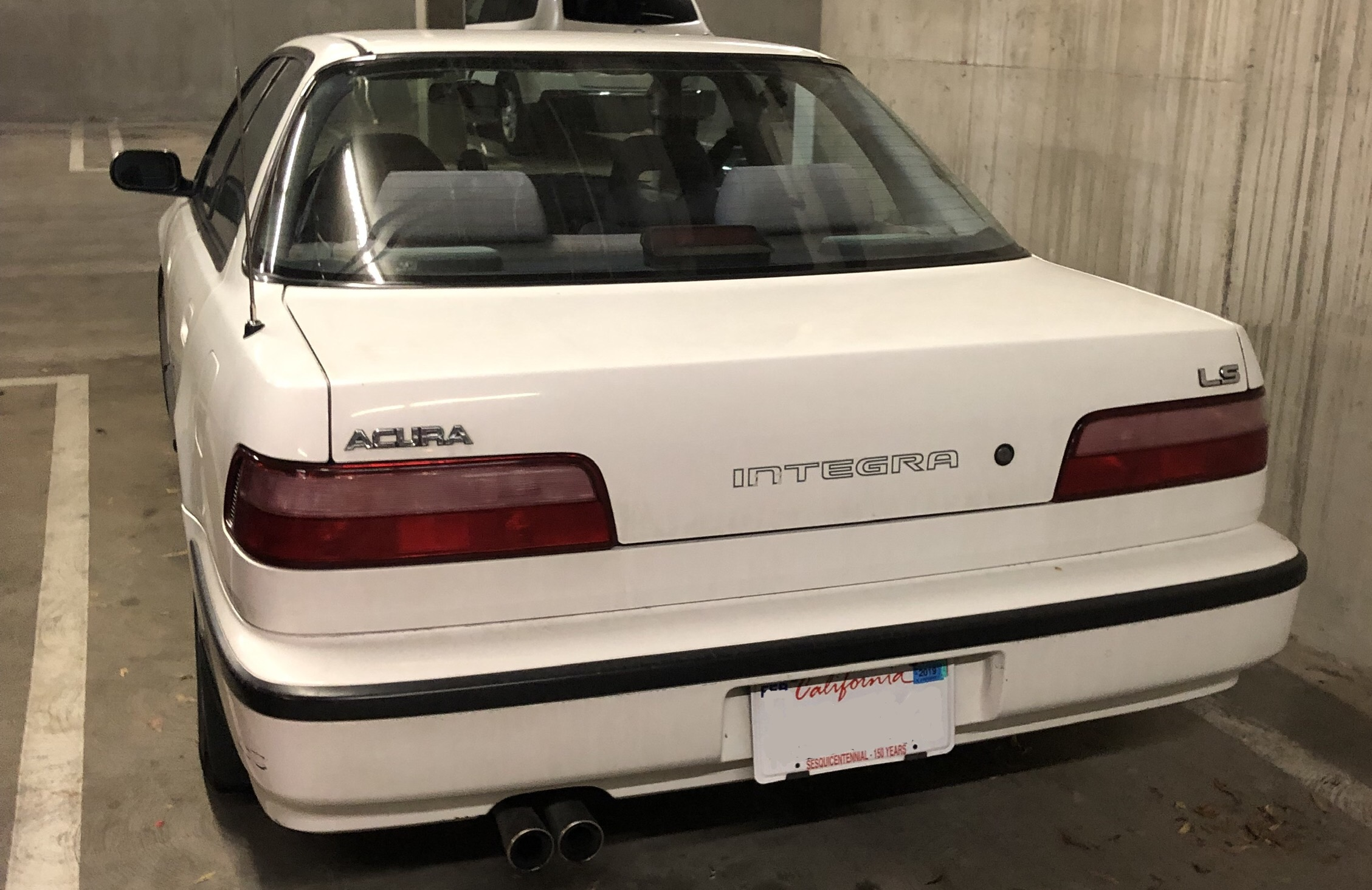
Acura Integra LS sedan rear

In North America, the Integra was sold under the Acura nameplate. Acura offered three trim levels (RS, LS and GS) for 1990 and 1991 model years and added a fourth trim level (GS-R) beginning in May 1992. Model choices consisted of a 3-door liftback and a new 4-door sedan. All trim levels were available with a 5-speed manual or 4-speed automatic transmission except for the GS-R which was only offered in a 5-speed manual with shorter gearing than other trim levels.

The second-generation Integra coupe is 4.2 in (107 mm) longer overall and 1.8 in (46 mm) wider than the previous generation. A new 1.8-liter DOHC 4-cylinder engine producing 130 HP was standard equipment. Anti-lock brakes was standard on the GS model and motorized front shoulder belts were standard on all US-market models, while the Canadian-market models had the manual front shoulder belts.

==== GS-R ====
For the 1992 and 1993 model years, Acura offered a GS-R model. The GS-R liftback came only with a 5-speed manual transmission and 1.7-liter B17A1 DOHC VTEC 4-cylinder engine with 160 hp (119 kW). The GS-R model came with a rear spoiler and 195/60/VR14 tires and alloy wheels.

Less than 5,000 of the 1992–1993 model years Acura Integra GS-R were produced for North America; this is confirmed by the vehicle identification number sequence of these cars. Using this information, the production numbers of the GS-R via vehicle history reports are determined. The North American production breakdown was reported as follows:

Country	MY 1992	MY 1993	Total
US	3,118	850	3,968
Canada	602	255	857
Total	3,720	1,105	4,825

== Third generation (1993) ==
Series DB6-DB9, DC1-DC2, DC4
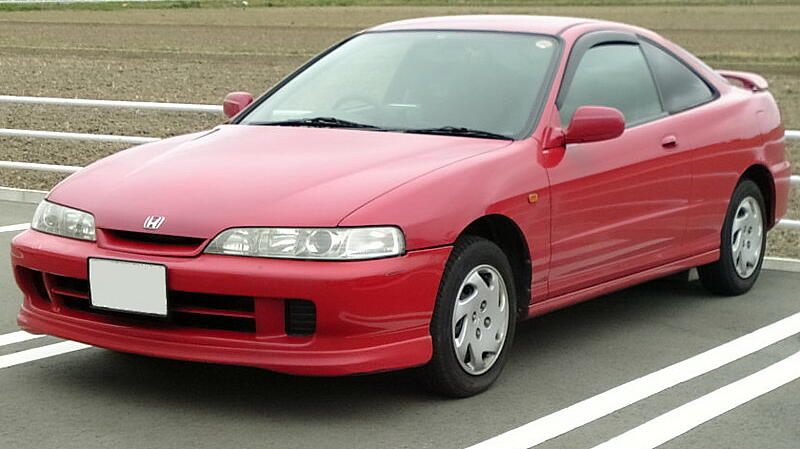
- Facelift Integra Liftback coupe in Japan.

Overview
- Production: 1993–2001
- Model years: 1994–2001
- Assembly: Japan: Suzuka, Mie (Suzuka Plant)
- Designer: Akira Shimoyama

Body and chassis
- Body style: 3-door liftback coupé 4-door pillared hardtop sedan
- Layout: front-wheel drive all-wheel drive (DB9 only)
- Related: Honda Civic; Honda Accord

Powertrain
- Engine: 1.6 L ZC I4 (DB6, DB9, DC1); 1.8 L B18B DOHC I4 (DB7, DC4); 1.8 L B18C DOHC VTEC I4 (DB8, DC2)
- Transmission: 5-speed close-ratio manual 4-speed automatic (with 2,400 rpm torque converter)

Dimensions
- Wheelbase: 2,570 mm (101.2 in) (Liftback); 2,620 mm (103.1 in) (Sedan)
- Length: 4,380 mm (172.4 in) (Liftback); 4,395 mm (173.0 in) (Liftback, AU/NZ); 4,425 mm (174.2 in) ('00–'01 Liftback GS-R); 4,525 mm (178.1 in) (Sedan)
- Width: 1,695 mm (66.7 in) (all Japan models, '94–'96 Liftback international); 1,710 mm (67.3 in) ('98–'01 Liftback international)
- Height: 1,290 mm (50.8 in) ('94–'95 Liftback); 1,335 mm (52.6 in) ('96–'01 Liftback); 1,320 mm (52.0 in) ('98–'99 TypeR); 1,325 mm (52.2 in) ('94–'96 Sedan); 1,370 mm (53.9 in) ('96–'01 Sedan)
- Curb weight: 1,105 kg (2,436 lb) (Liftback, Manual); 1,125 kg (2,480 lb) (Liftback, Auto, AU/NZ); 1,175 kg (2,590 lb) (Liftback, Auto); 1,177 kg (2,595 lb)

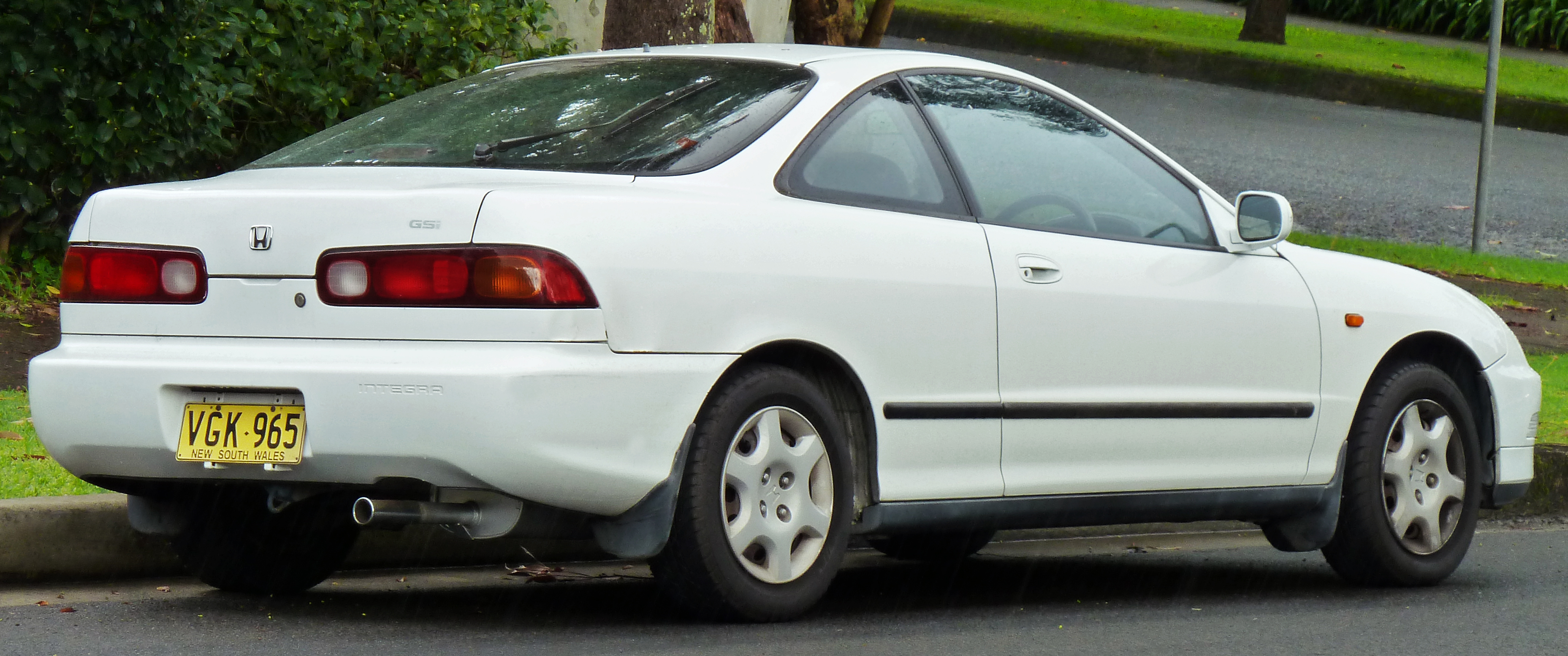
Pre-facelift Integra GSi coupe in Australia.

Honda debuted the third-generation model in 1993 in Japan at Honda Verno locations. It had a new four headlight front end design which was dubbed "spider eyes" by some enthusiasts. Standard horsepower (in Japan) from the 1.6 single cam ZC engine increased to 120 hp (89 kW; 122 PS). In the U.S., a then new B18B1 DOHC engine became standard, and produced 140 hp (104 kW; 142 PS). The top model was known in Japan as "Si", and it was powered by a B18C VTEC engine that produced 178 hp (133 kW; 180 PS).

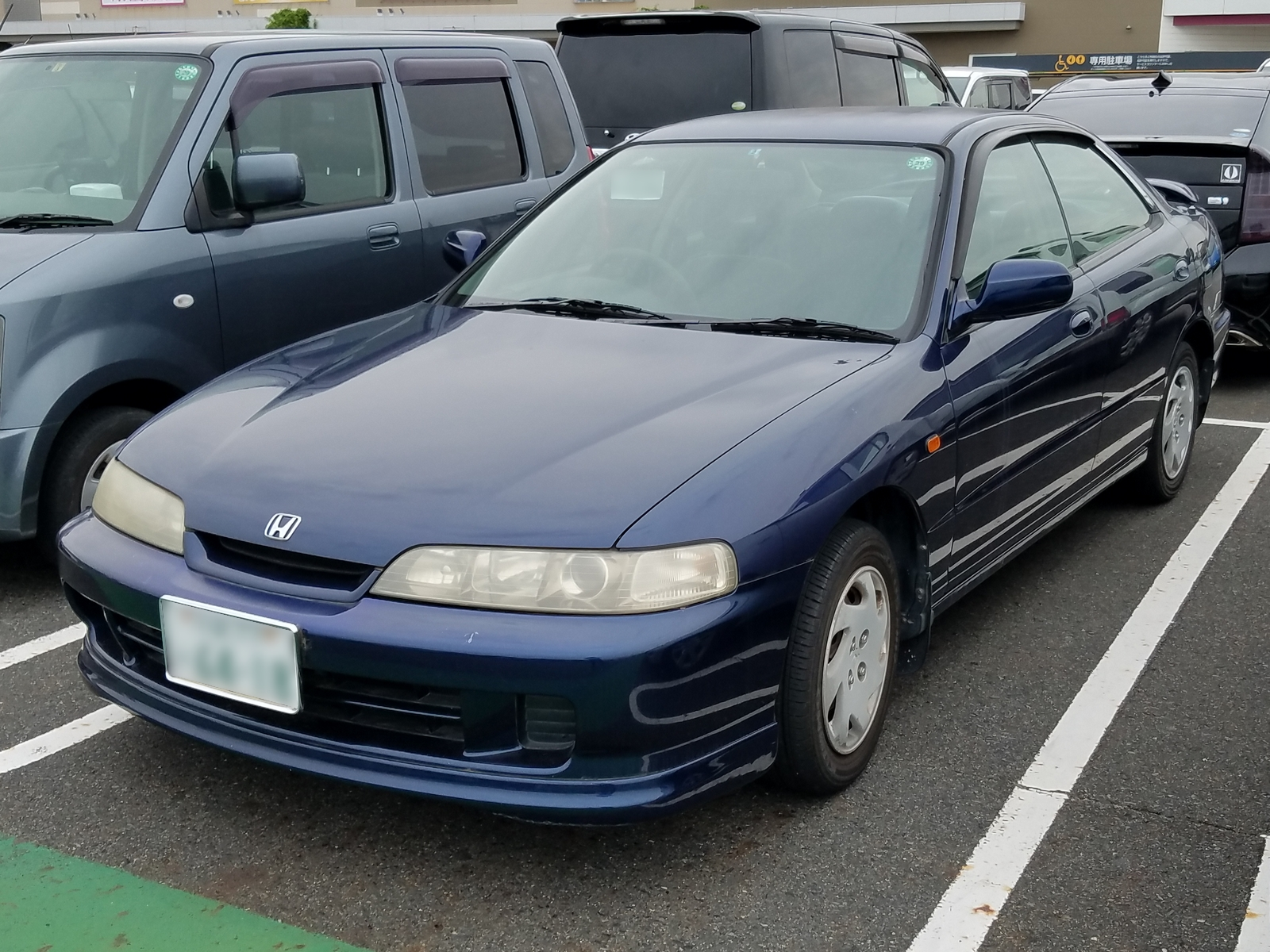
Facelift Integra hardtop sedan (DB6) in Japan.

The four headlight front end design, or "spider eye" headlights, proved controversial in Japan, so all JDM Integras were given a minor facelift in late 1994, with more conventional elongated flat headlights and a revised front bumper. The top model was rebadged as the Integra SiR. Shortly after that, in 1995, a Type R version of the Integra was released to the Japanese market.

This generation Integra was generally not available in Europe, although some markets such as Greece did receive this model. Those cars were fitted with a 104 hp (78 kW; 105 PS) version of the 1590 cc ZC engine. From 1998 onward, non-JDM Integras (including Type R models) received a facelift to the front bumper which gave the car a more aggressive style, where it moved the embossed "INTEGRA" label to below the left headlights, eliminated the horizontal strut across the radiator grille and reshaped the headlight housing, turn signal housing and lower bumper.

Dealer-installed options for the third-generation Integra included: security system, 15-inch alloy wheels, trunk mat, splash guards, fog lights, rear-wing spoiler, moonroof (liftback only), CD changer, leather seats, leather-wrapped shift knob and steering wheel.

=== US trim levels ===
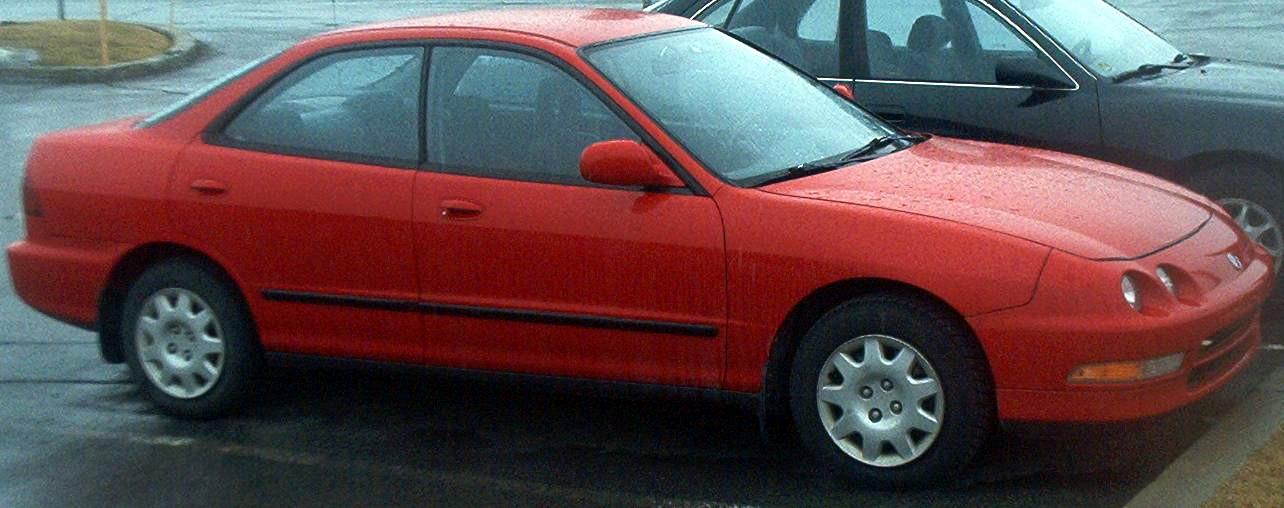
Pre-facelift Acura Integra LS sedan

RS: Rally Sport was available in both liftback and sedan. There was no sedan available in 1998. Model dropped in 1999 (due to the Type R models introduced in 1997). In 1994 for the 1995 model year, this model was equipped with the 1.8-liter DOHC (B18B1) 4-cylinder engine producing 140 hp (104 kW; 142 PS) and 135 lb⋅ft (183 N⋅m) of torque. RS models were replaced by the Type R model that was released in 1997, as the lightest weight and least optioned Integra model. Standard features were a cassette player, rear-window defroster, and tilt steering wheel. The cassette player was replaced with a CD player in 1997. The RS models as well as Type Rs did not come with moonroofs or cruise control as options, while the LS, SE, GS, and GS-R sub-models did.

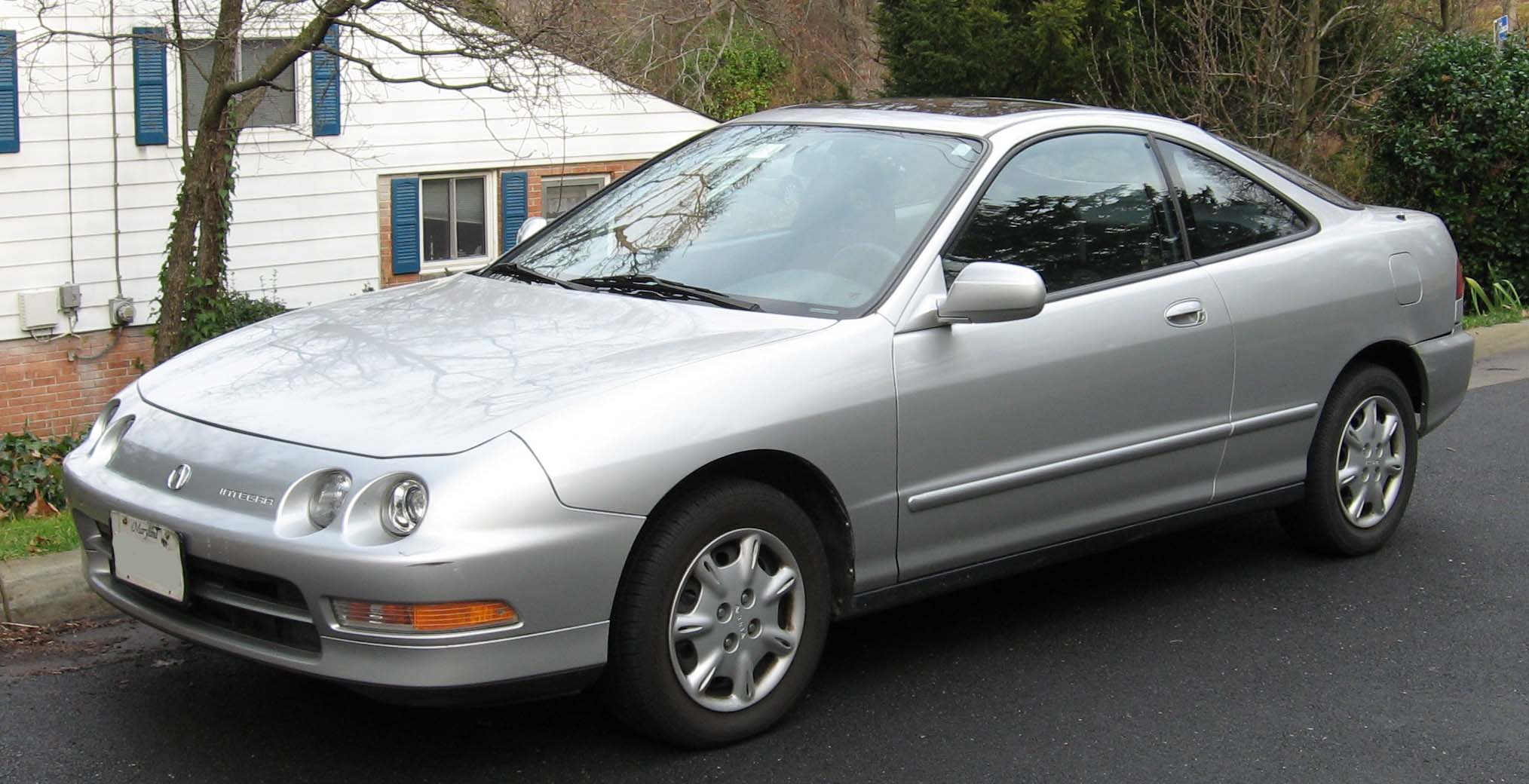
Pre-facelift Acura Integra LS coupe

LS: Luxury Sport, was available in both liftback and sedan a leather-wrapped steering wheel and shift knob.

SE: Special Edition, was available in both liftback and sedan starting from 1995. This trim package was only available in 1995 and 1996 model years until the older GS trim name was re-instated back in 1997. From the LS, it added leather seats, alloy wheels on all years, and a rear-wing spoiler (optional).

GS: Grand Sport, was available in both liftback and sedan starting from 1997. Same standard features as the SE. Including a rear spoiler.

GS-R: Grand Sport Racing, was available in both liftback and sedan. Equipped with the 1.8-liter DOHC VTEC (B18C1) 4-cylinder engine producing 170 hp (127 kW; 172 PS) and 128 lb⋅ft (174 N⋅m) of torque. It came equipped with a rear spoiler, 6-speaker stereo, power moonroof, 195/55/VR15 tires and alloy wheels. The leather option package would add leather upholstery, leather-wrapped steering wheel and shift knob. An automatic transmission is an option in certain markets for this model.

Type R (1997-1998 and 2000-2001): was only available as a liftback. Equipped with the 1.8-liter DOHC VTEC (B18C5) 4-cylinder engine producing 195 hp (145 kW; 198 PS) limited-slip differential, unique interior trim, front spoiler, high rear wing, Type R badging, lowered sport suspension, and unique 7-spoke 5-lug 15-inch alloy wheels. The side moldings across the doors and quarter panels, normally found on other trims, were removed for this model, which further improved aerodynamics. This model also replaced the RS model in 1997 and brought further weight reduction and removal of options. Deletes air conditioning, leather upholstery, tilt/height adjustable driver seat, visor mirrors, and cruise control. Also uses the hardtop body style, like the RS models, with no moonroof. The model also featured lighter glass and body panels for weight reduction, a strut bar in the lower rear hatch, and strengthened chassis points for rigidity. Air conditioning would be a dealer-installed option. (Note: 1997-1998 Type R models only available in Championship White. 1999-2000 Type R was available in two colors; Phoenix Yellow ('00-'01) and Flamenco Black Pearl ('00) or Nighthawk Black Pearl ('01).)

=== Integra Type R ===
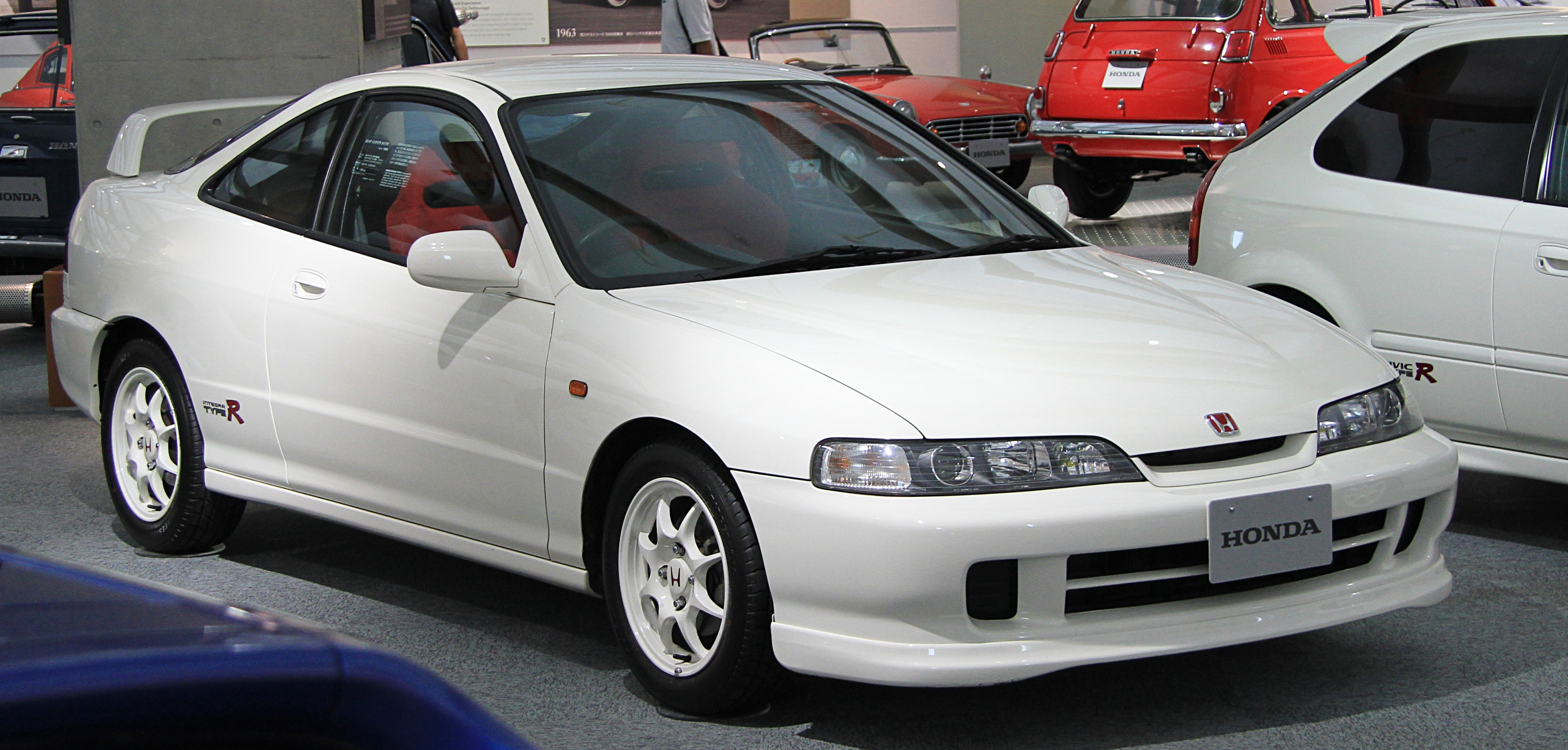
1995–1998 JDM Honda Integra Type R

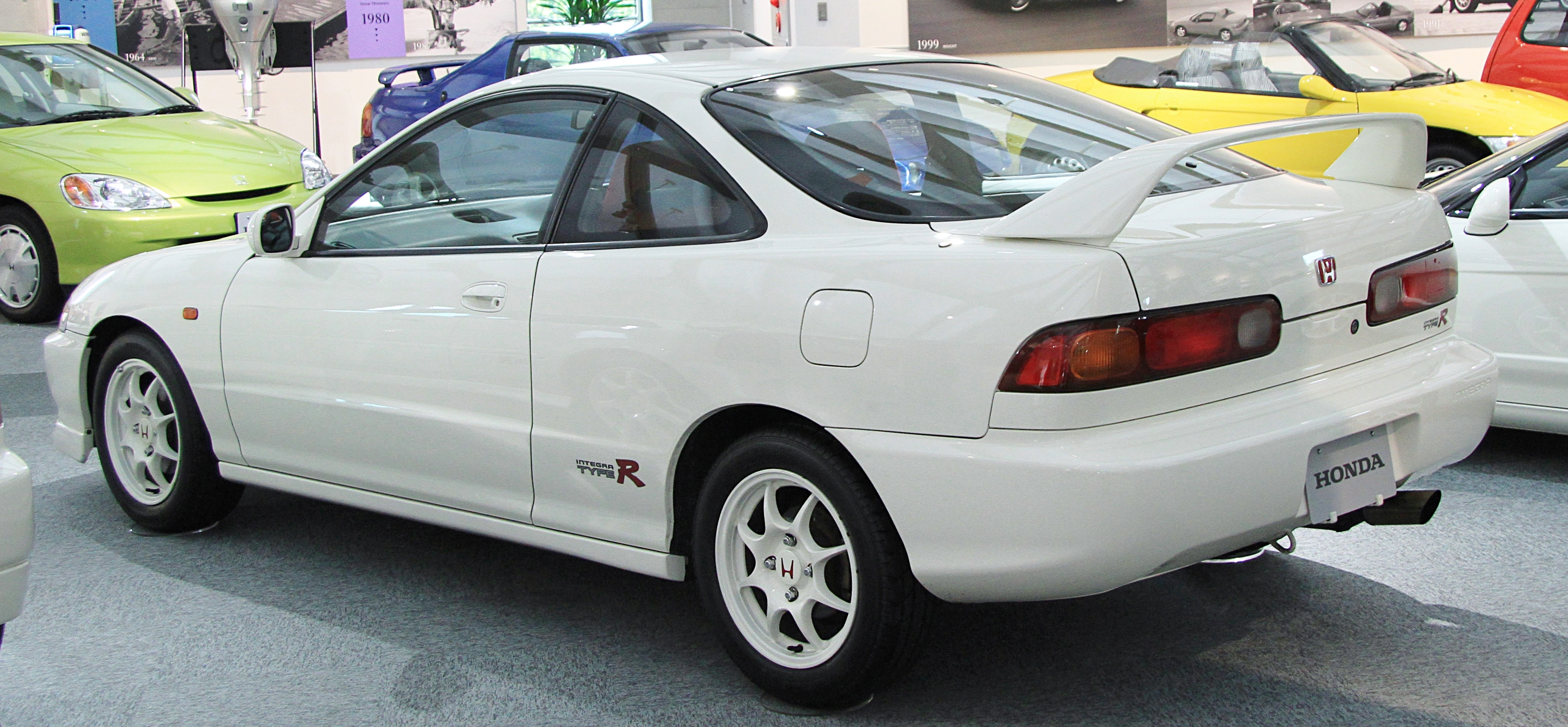
1995–1998 JDM Honda Integra Type R rear

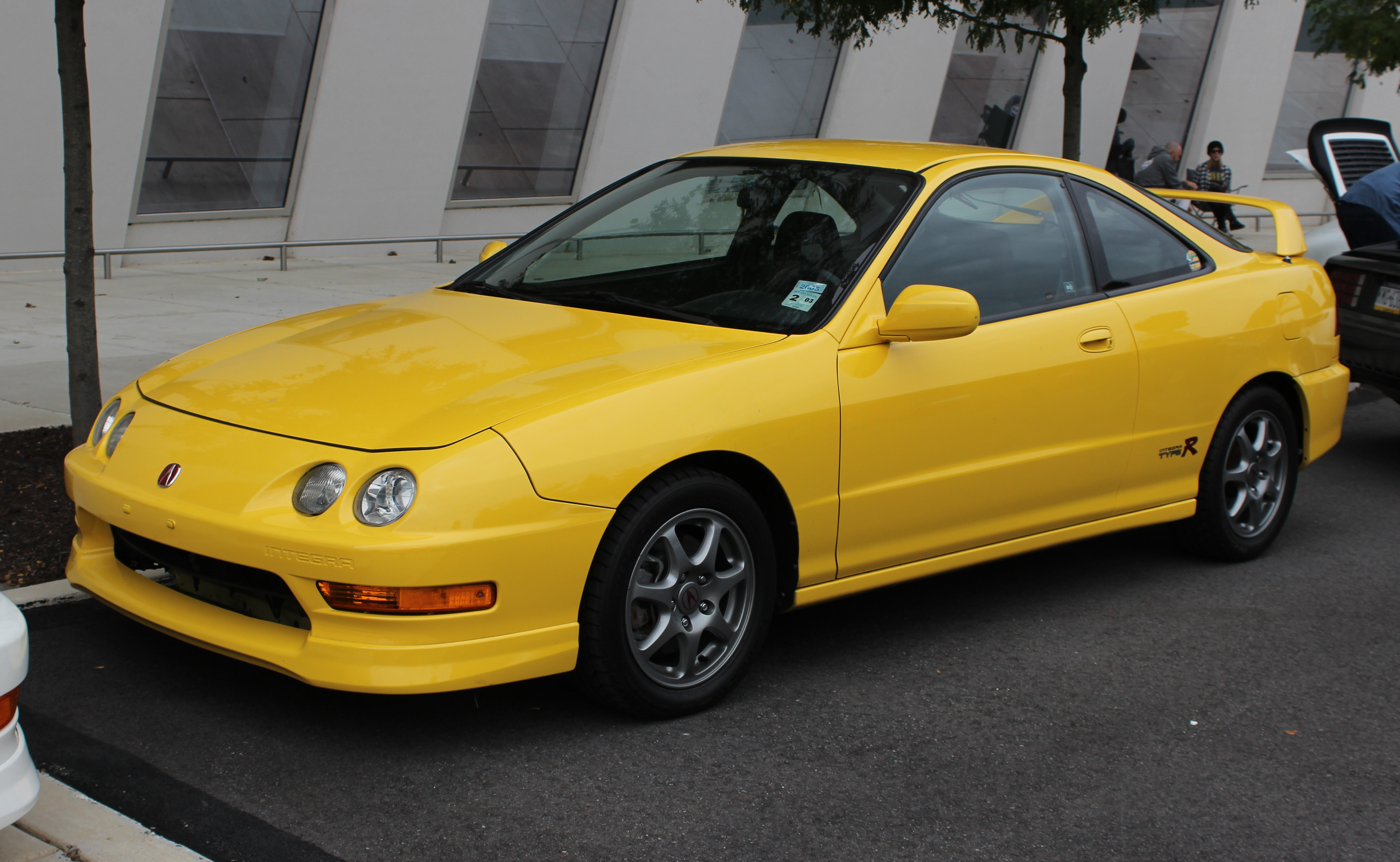
2000–2001 Acura Integra Type R (US)

In 1995, Honda introduced the Integra Type R to the Japanese domestic market. The Japanese specification Type R came standard with a 147 kW (200 PS; 197 hp) factory-tuned variant of the B18C engine. Power figures varied slightly between markets, with North American cars putting out 145 kW (198 PS; 195 hp) and UK-spec cars making 139 kW (190 PS; 187 hp). Equipped with a close-ratio 5-speed manual transmission and a helical-type limited-slip differential, the Integra Type R had significantly improved performance and handling relative to the GS-R/Si/SiR-G Integra.

These were the result of extensive changes, including a strengthened chassis with extra spot welds and thicker metal around the rear shock towers and lower subframe, weight reduction (reduced sound insulation, 10 percent thinner windscreen, lighter wheels), more power, rev limiter set at 8,600 rpm JDM (8,500 rpm US, 8,700 rpm UK), hand-built engine featuring hand-polished and ported intake ports, high-compression pistons, undercut valves and revised intake and exhaust systems, and suspension upgrades. The result was a capable sports liftback which was acclaimed by motoring journalists worldwide. The JDM version was significantly lighter than the SiR Integra (The 96–97 spec model could delete the air bags, air conditioning, rear wiper, radio, center console, clock, power steering and anti-lock brakes), However, there is only a 33 lb (15 kg) net weight difference between the American Integra Type R and the Integra GS-R because the extra metal and cross bracing in the Type R negate much of the 98 lb of weight reductions. The Type R was the only Type R ever sold in North America with the Acura badge. For the European, Australian and New Zealand market, the Integra was sold as a Honda with the four headlight front-end design.

The JDM Type R received significant upgrades in 1998 and is known as the '98 Spec R. Some of the main changes were a redesigned rear bumper, 16-inch wheels with 215/45R16 tires, 5-lug nut wheel hubs and bigger brakes. Gear ratios for the final drive were higher, making 1st to 3rd gears closer, while 4th and 5th were longer to maintain the '96 Spec cruising comfort. The engine power remained the same, but use of a new 4–1 long tube header brought torque lower down to 6,200 rpm.

A final revision of the JDM Type R known as the '00 Spec R included a revised intake camshaft, and more finely balanced drive shafts. A final trim version offered in mid-2000 onwards for the JDM market (known as the "Type Rx") came factory fitted with motorized folding mirrors, dashboard clock, blue-hue carbon trim interiors, and an audio system as part of the standard package.

==== Type R performance and reviews ====
- Edmund's Insideline tested a 12-year-old stock Type R: 0–60 mph (97 km/h) in 6.8 seconds, 1/4 mile in 14.9 seconds at 95.2 mph.
- Motor Trend clocked the Type R at: 0–60 mph (97 km/h) in 6.2 seconds, 1/4 mile in 14.8 at 96.3 mph.
- Sport Compact Car clocked the Type R at: 0–60 mph (97 km/h) in 6.1 seconds, 1/4 mile in 14.5 at 96 mph.

In Japan, the Integra is revered as one of the best sports cars of the '90s. On Japanese car review show “Best Motoring” the Integra Type R punched well above its weight competing with the fastest 4WD turbocharged cars of the time, the Nissan Skyline GTR and the Subaru WRX STI.

It has been acclaimed by motoring journalists worldwide, including Evo magazine, which named the Type R 'the greatest front-wheel-drive performance car ever', and TheAutoChannel.com, which similarly called it 'the best handling front-wheel drive car ever'.

=== Four-wheel Drive Integra (DB9) ===
The third generation also saw the production of a four-wheel drive option. Available only in the four-door sedan, the ZXi4WD (93–95) and Xi4WD (95-00) had 1.6L SOHC ZC engines coupled to a version of Honda's Real Time 4WD.

=== Integra SJ (EK3) (1996) ===
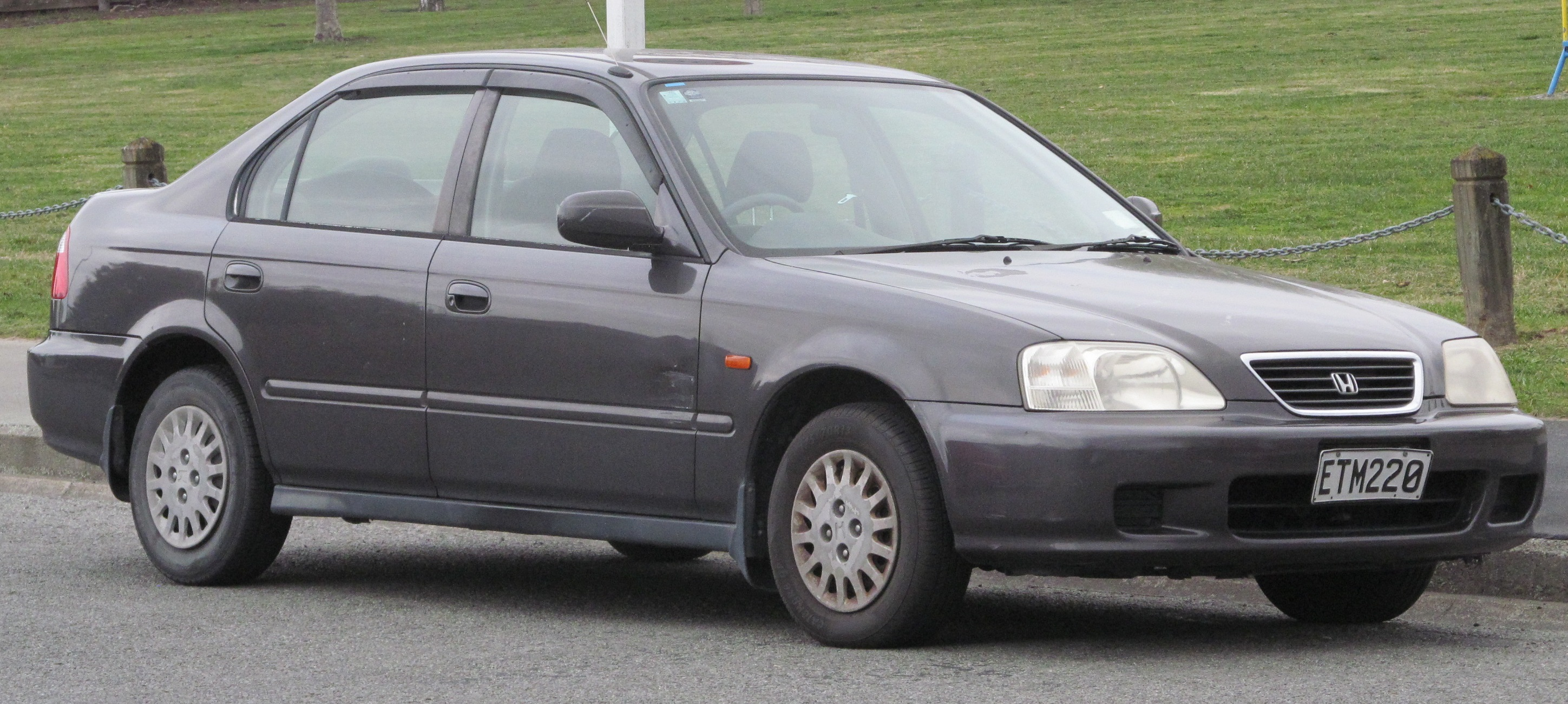
Honda Integra SJ

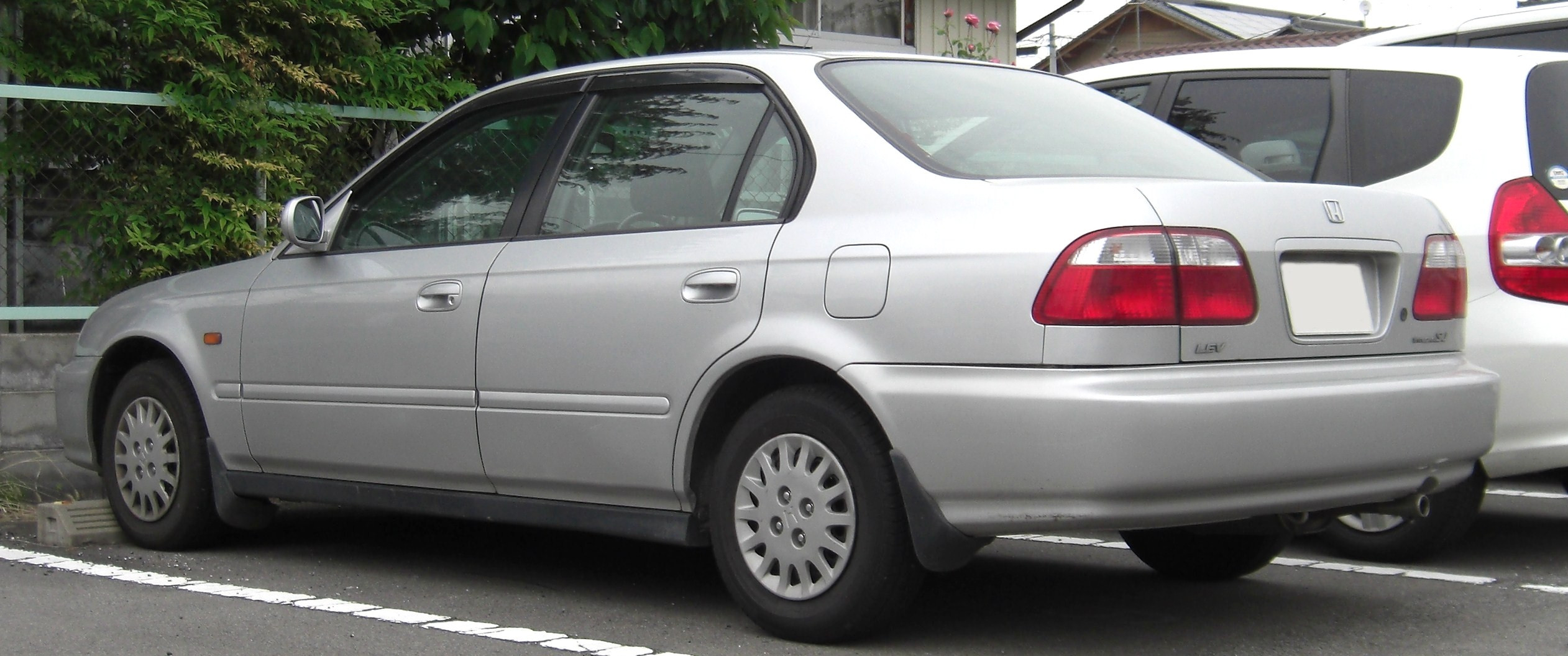
Honda Integra SJ

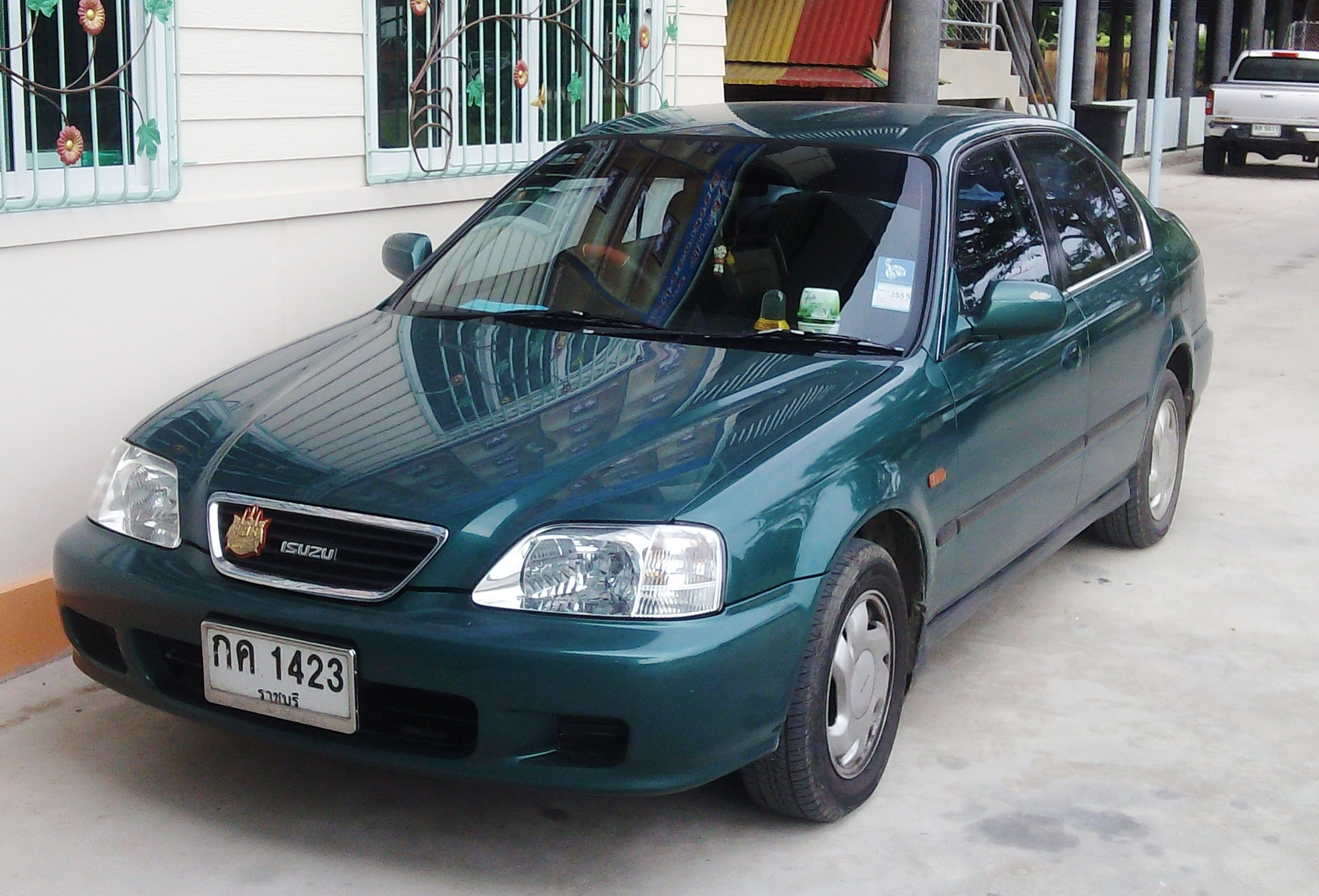
Isuzu Vertex (Thailand)

The Integra SJ (standing for "Sedan Joyful") was a rebadged Civic Ferio (a Honda Primo product) with modified headlamps and grille similar to the Orthia's and slightly larger rear lights that were also utilized on the Japanese market Civic LEV sedan. The Integra SJ was sold in Japan at Honda Verno dealerships. It originated from the Honda Domani, another derivative of this vehicle sold at Honda Clio locations. It was made from 1996 to 2001, and used the 1493 cc D15B engine. Honda's press material of the time indicated that the SJ was intended to provide a "formal sedan" for the Integra range; another reason may have been to sell Ferios using a more sporting model name at Honda Verno dealerships in Japan, as was the case with the Nissan Laurel Spirit.

In Thailand, the Integra SJ was sold as the Isuzu Vertex, the last Isuzu passenger car ever for that market. It followed Isuzu's practice of selling Honda models as Isuzus which started with the Gemini; with Honda also selling Isuzu's sport utility vehicles in Japan and North America (some as Acuras in the latter market), and pickup trucks in Thailand.

=== Theft in the United States ===
According to a 2002 Highway Loss Data Institute study, the Integra "accounts for 21.7 [theft] claims per 1,000 vehicles", compared to a contemporary Jeep Wrangler, the second most-stolen car model of that period, at just 8.5 claims per 1,000 vehicles.

In 2004, CCC Information Services named the 1999 Integra as the most stolen car in the United States, with the 1998 model year of the car listed as the third-most stolen model for that year. In 2014, LoJack named the Integra as the sixth most stolen car among vehicles equipped with their car tracking service.

== Fourth generation (2001) ==
Series DC5
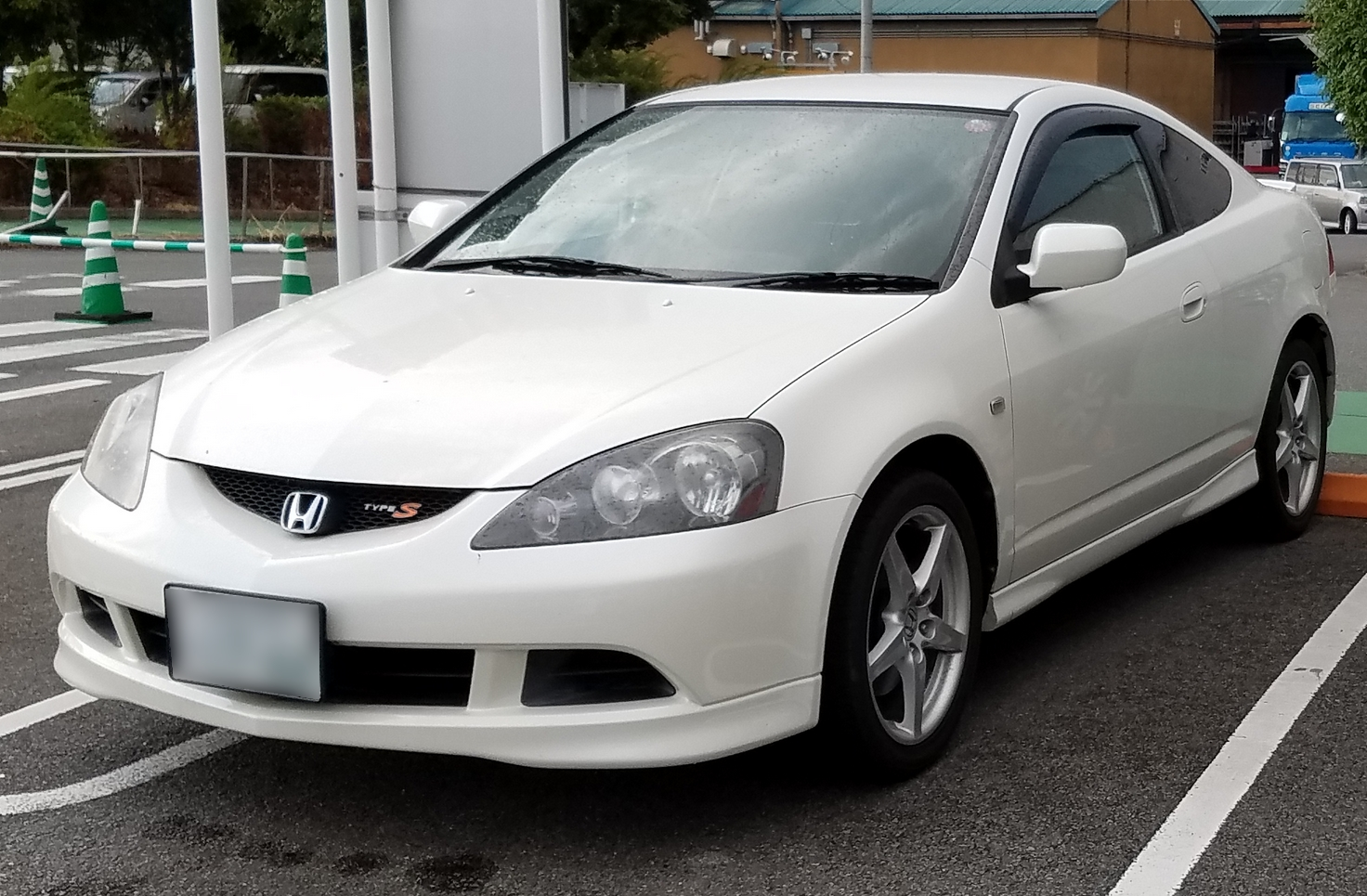
- Honda Integra Type S (DC5, Japan)

Overview
- Also called: Acura RSX
- Production: 2001–2006
- Model years: 2002–2006
- Assembly: Japan: Suzuka, Mie (Suzuka Plant)

Body and chassis
- Body style: 3-door liftback coupé

Powertrain
- Engine: 2.0 L K20A, K20A2 (02-04), K20A3, K20Z1 (05-06)
- Transmission: 5-speed manual 6-speed manual 5-speed automatic

Dimensions
- Wheelbase: 2,570 mm (101.2 in)
- Length: 4,397 mm (173.1 in)
- Width: 1,724 mm (67.9 in)
- Height: 2002–04: 1,400 mm (55.1 in); 2005–06: 1,394 mm (54.9 in)
- Curb weight: 2,790 lb (1,266 kg)

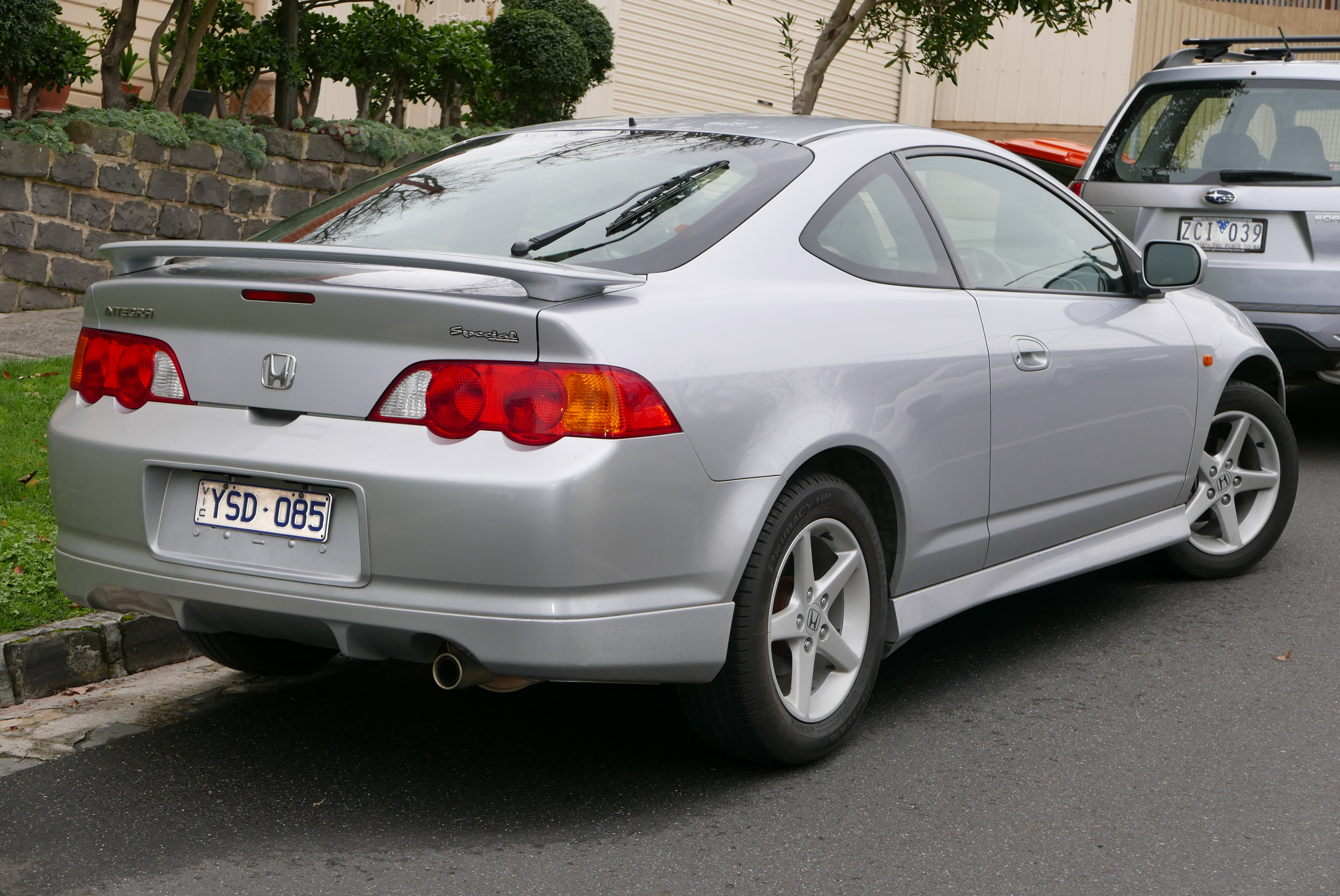
Honda Integra Special Edition coupe

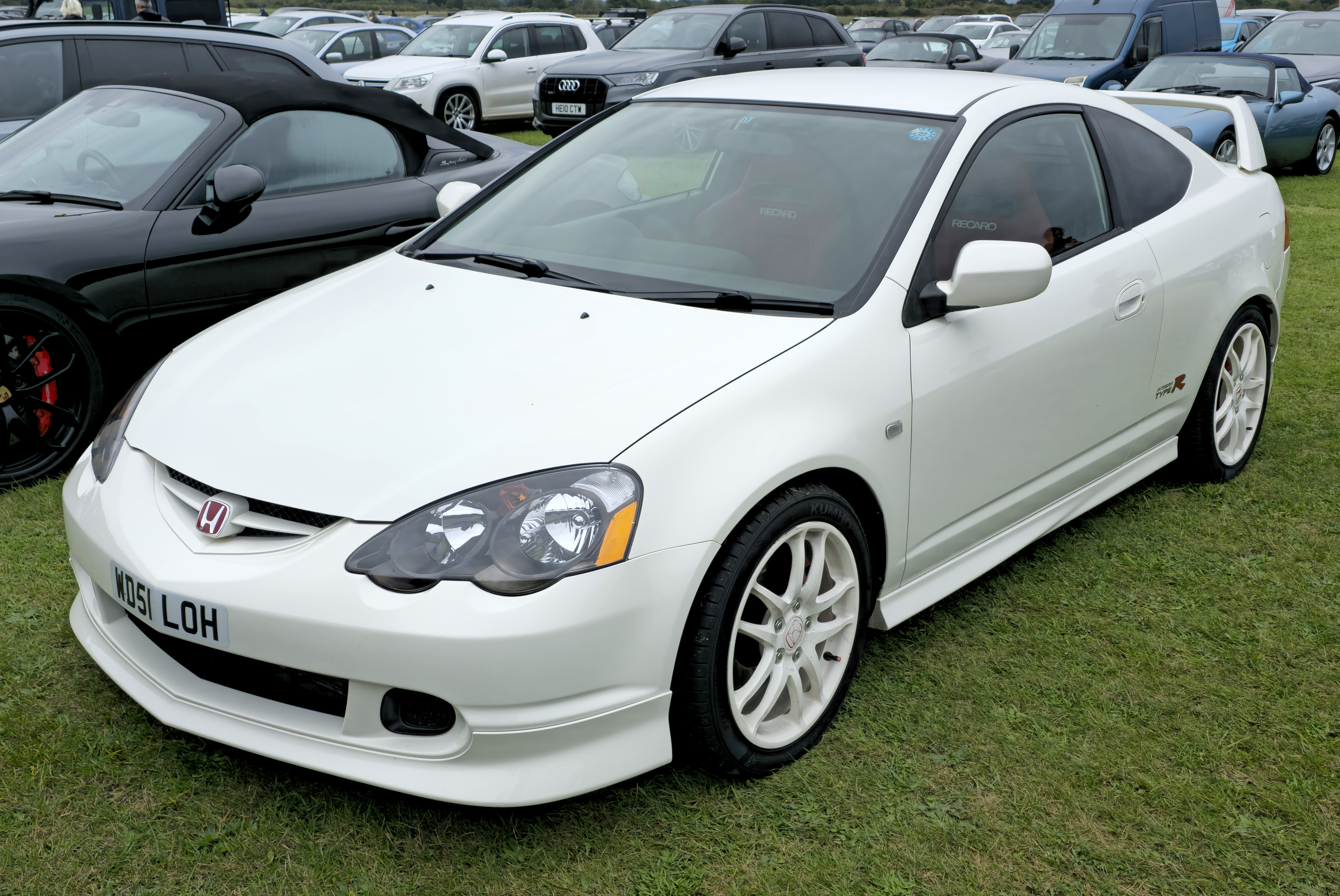
Honda Integra DC5 Type R

The fourth-generation Integra was introduced in Japan on April 13, 2001 and produced from July 2001 until August 2006. For North America (United States and Canada), it was introduced as the Acura RSX in accordance with Acura's new alphabetical naming scheme. It also had an entirely new engine, the K-series. The Integra came in two models in the United States - the RSX, which was powered by a 160 HP K20A3 (also used in the '02-'05 EP3 Honda Civic Si Hatchback), or, the RSX Type-S which boasted a 200 HP K20A2 2.0L DOHC i-VTEC inline 4-cylinder from 2002 to 2004. The 2005 and 2006 RSX-S came with a K20Z1, originally rated at 210 HP. The RSX was sold as a Honda Integra in Japan and Australia, markets where the Acura brand did not exist.

In June 2006, Honda discontinued the Integra after its final 300 cars were sold, due to the shrinkage of the coupe market. The reaction of the consumers towards the discontinuation, however, forced Honda to extend production until July 2006 and produce 150 more Integras. The Acura RSX was discontinued as well, as the RSX did not fit within the confines of Acura's re-structured market strategy. This left the Acura TSX as Acura's entry-level vehicle. Also, the introduction of the similarly powerful and less expensive 2006 model-year Honda Civic Si was there to fill in the gap left by the RSX.

The Type R (Japanese market only) came standard with a K20A, 220 PS (162 kW; 217 hp) 2.0 L DOHC i-VTEC four-cylinder engine. The "i" in i-VTEC stands for intelligent VTEC, which employs VTC (Variable Timing Control) to advance or retard the intake cam timing within a 50 degree range. The Integra Type R came equipped, Recaro seats, four-piston Brembo front brakes, a close-ratio 6-speed manual transmission, a limited-slip differential, variable back-pressure exhaust system, and a stiffer suspension.

== Fifth generation (2022) ==
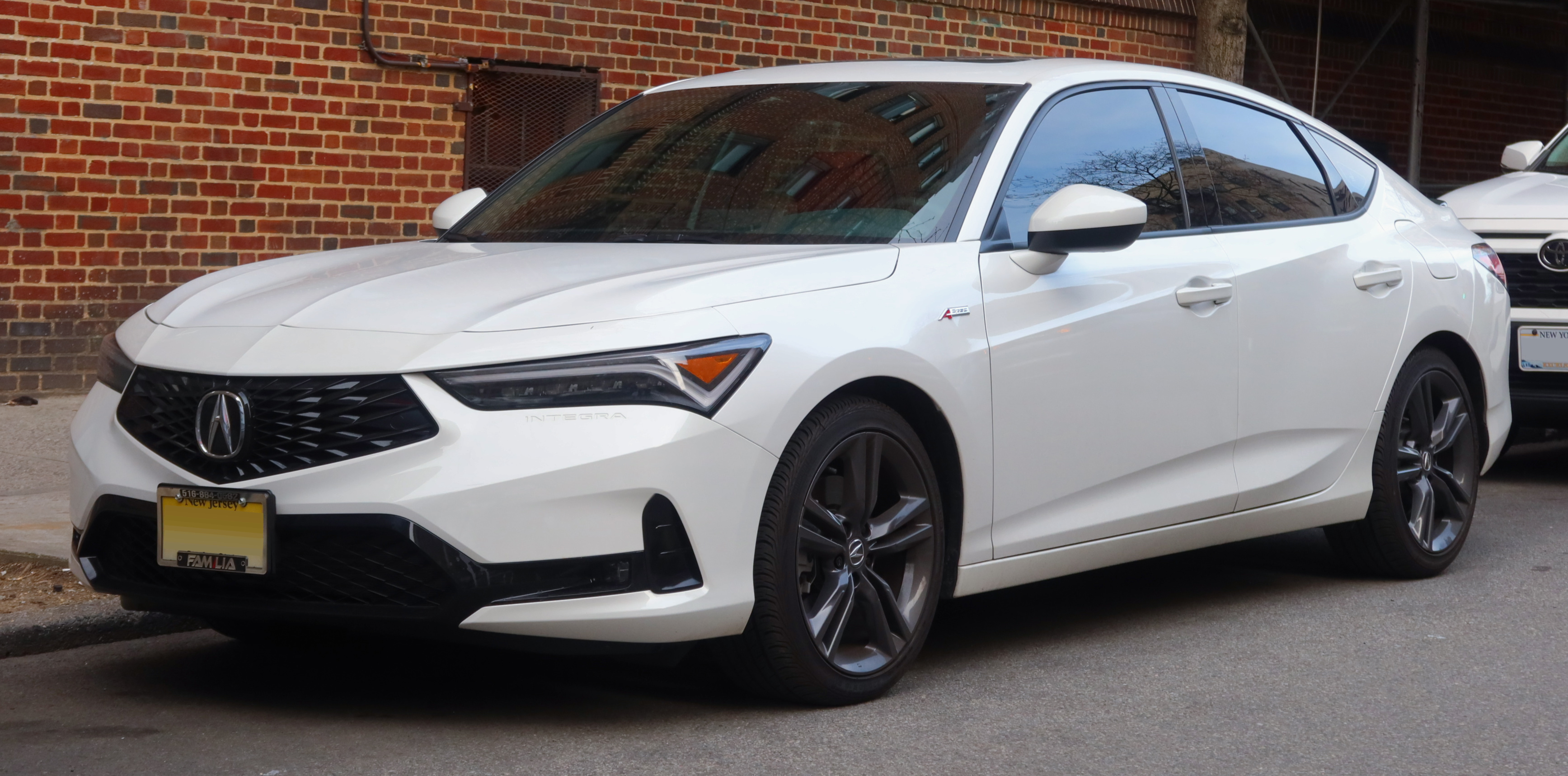
2023 Acura Integra (North America)

The Acura Integra was reintroduced in North America on June 2, 2022 for the 2023 model year as a 5-door liftback that replaced the ILX sedan. Built under the model codes DE4 and DE5, it is built on the same platform as the eleventh-generation Civic.

The Japanese-spec Integra Type S will be reintroduced on mid-2026 along with mid-size crossover, the Passport Trailsport. Previously, these booth models were exhibited at 2026 Osaka Auto Messe.

=== Use of the name in China ===
In China, the eleventh-generation Civic sedan produced by GAC Honda is sold as the Honda Integra (Chinese: 型格; pinyin: Xínggé) with some styling changes, as Dongfeng Honda produces the regular Civic in the country. The car was introduced in September 2021. Changes compared to the Civic include redesigned front and rear fasciae. A liftback version was introduced in February 2023 as the "Integra Hatchback".

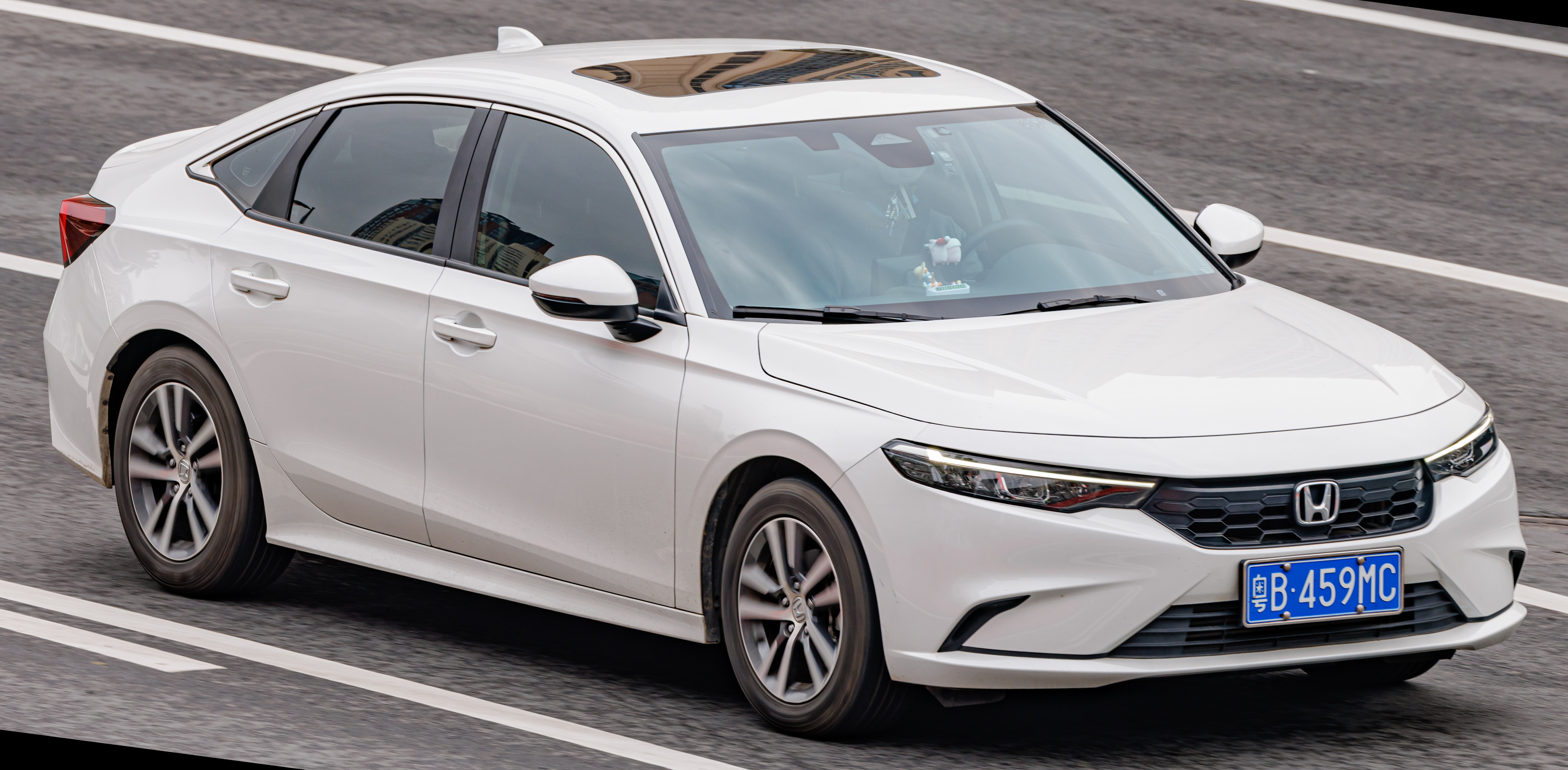
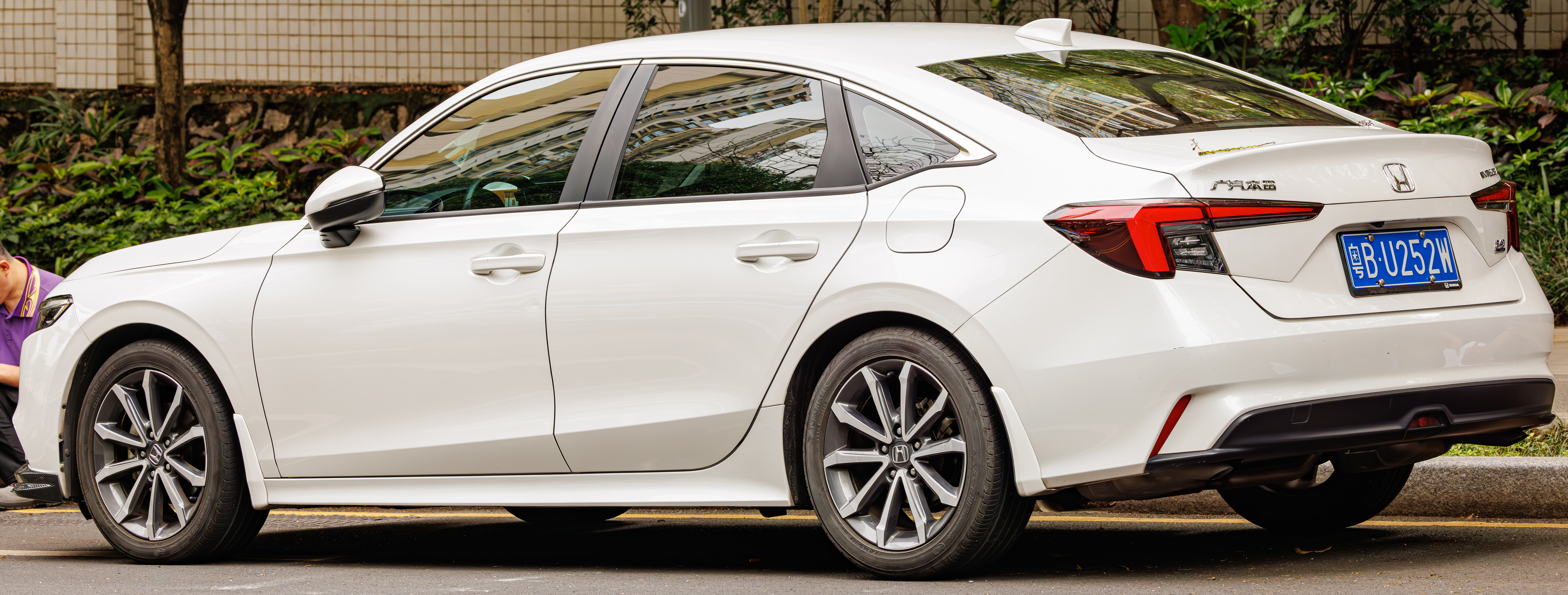
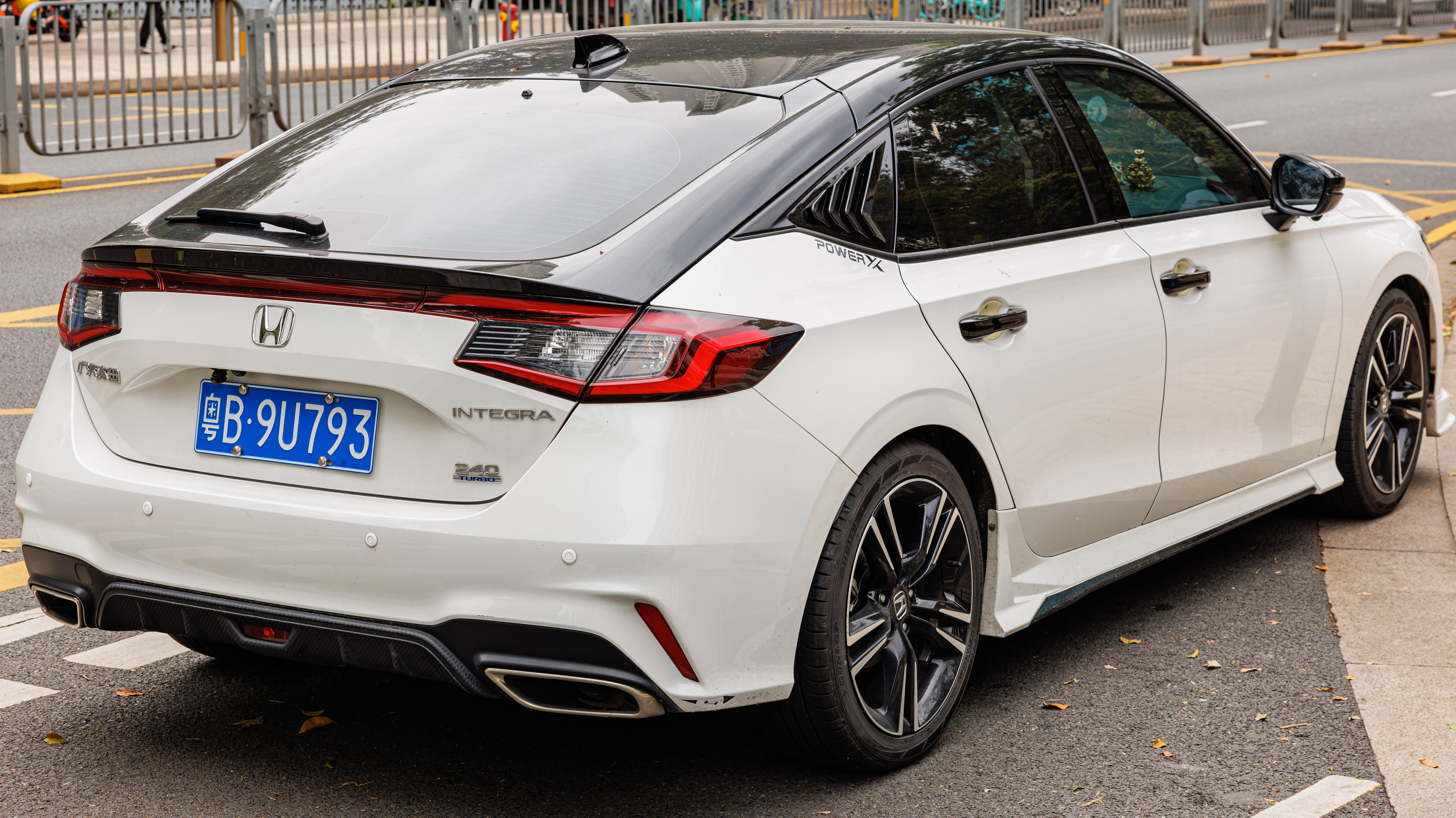
Chinese market Honda Integra sedan and liftback
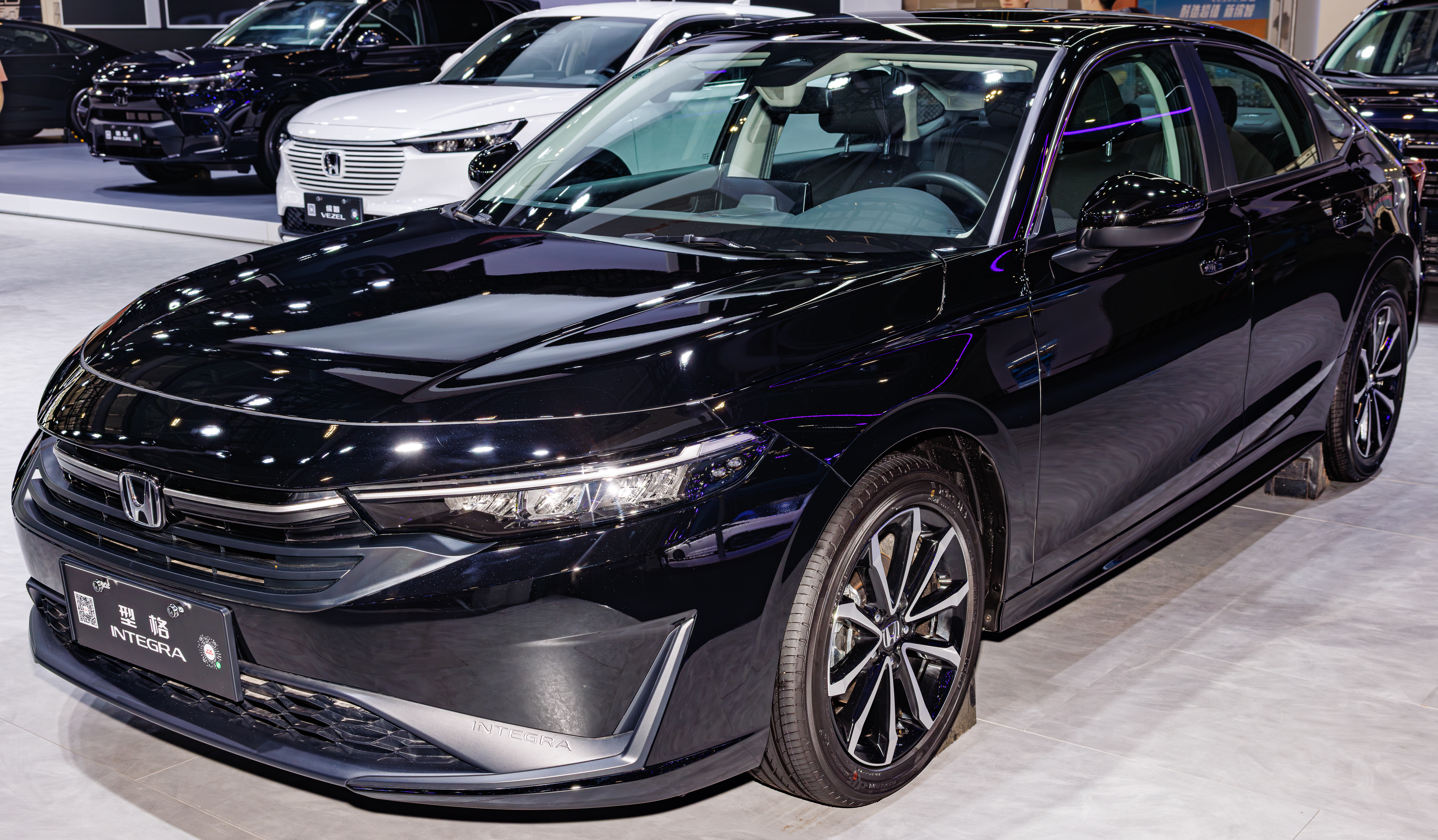
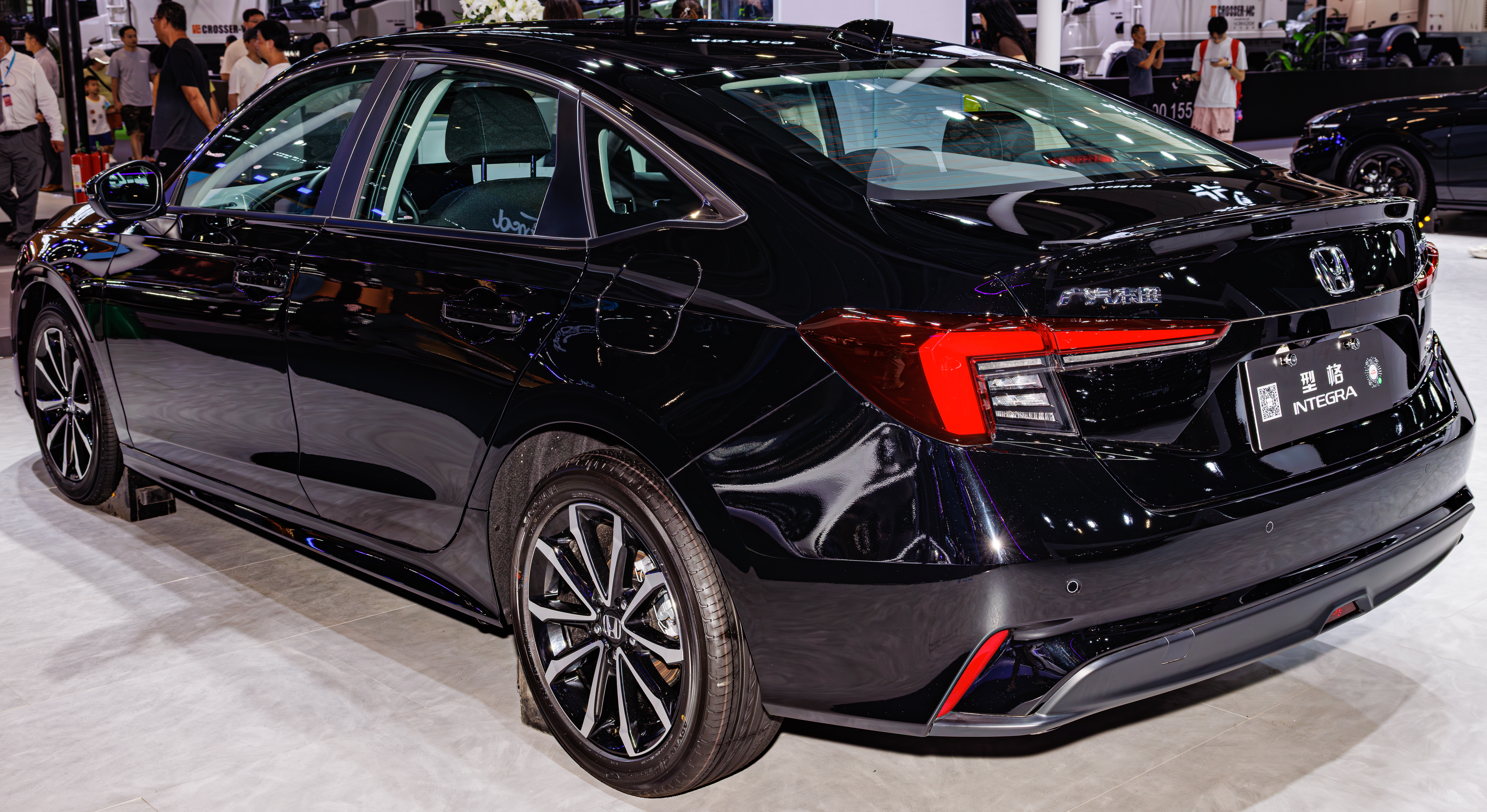
Chinese market Honda Integra sedan facelift
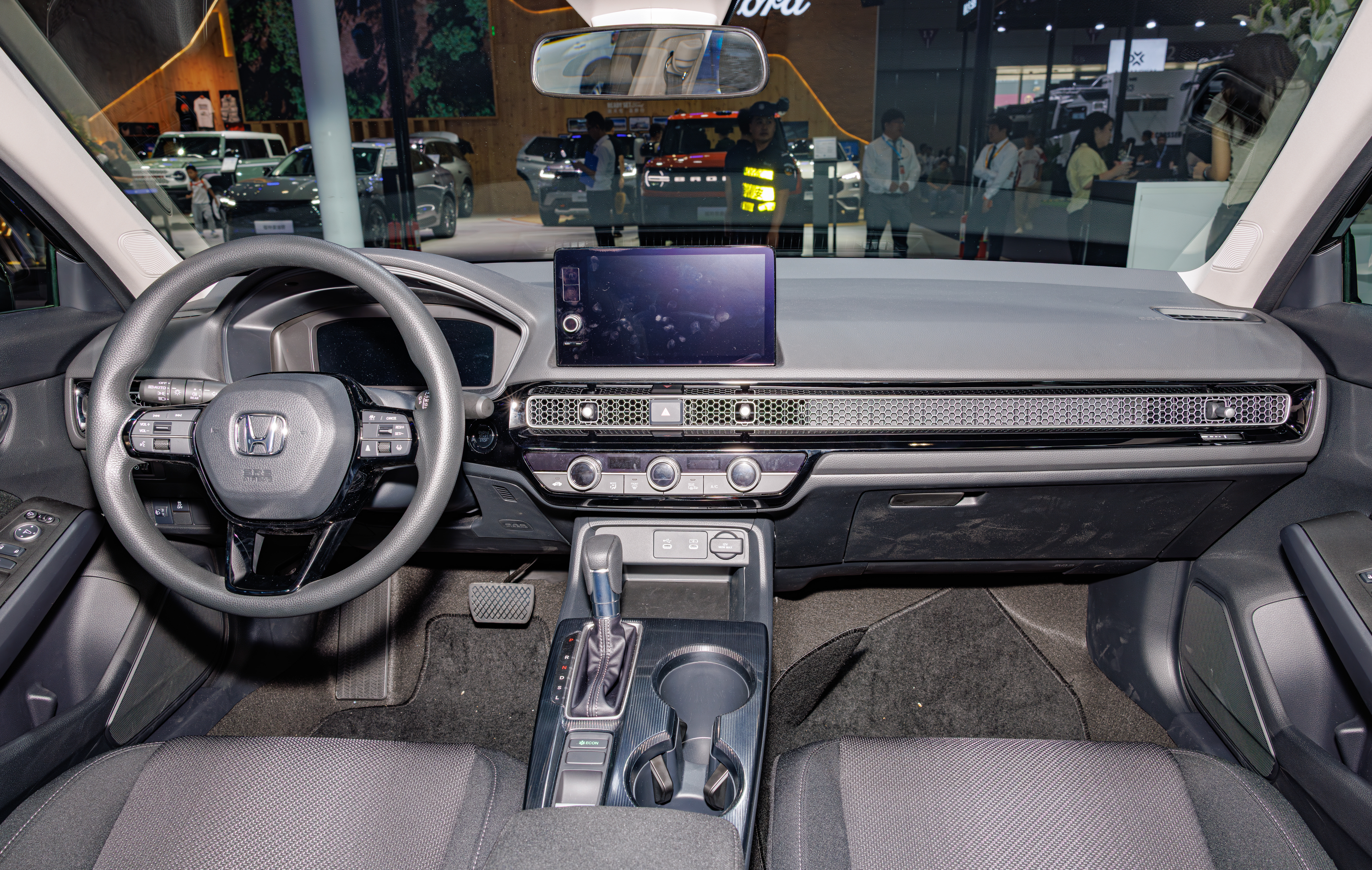
Interior

== Awards ==
- 1987: The Acura Integra is included in Car and Driver's 10Best. The first of eight appearances on the list.
- 1988: The Acura Integra is included in Car and Driver's 10Best
- 1994: The Acura Integra is included in Car and Driver's 10Best
- 1995: The Acura Integra is included in Car and Driver's 10Best
- 1996: The Acura Integra is included in Car and Driver's 10Best
- 1997: The Acura Integra is included in Car and Driver's 10Best
- 2002: The Acura RSX is included in Car and Driver's 10Best
- 2003: The Acura RSX is included in Car and Driver's 10Best
- 2023: Acura Integra is named North American Car of the Year
- 2024: The Acura Integra Type S is included in Car and Driver's 10Best
- 2024: The Acura Integra Type S is named Performance Car of the Year under $100,000 by Road & Track

== Motorsport ==
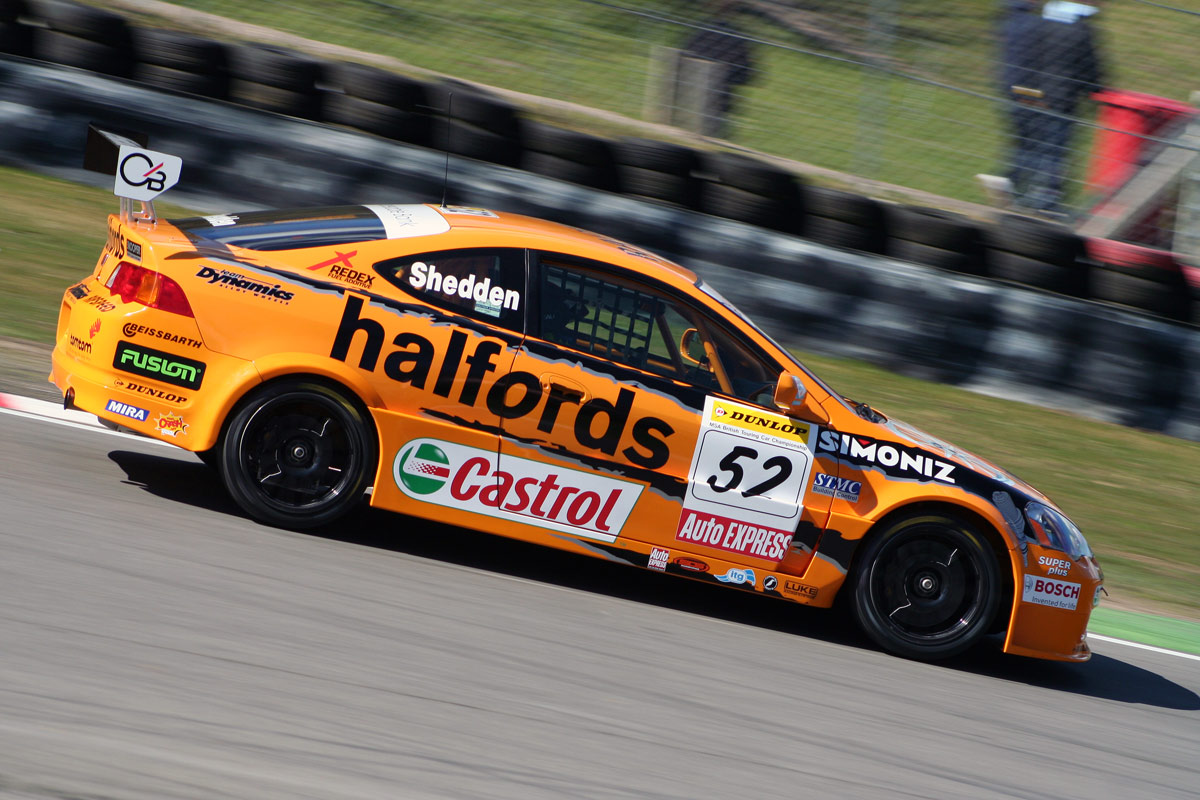
Gordon Shedden driving the Integra during the 2006 BTCC season.

The Integra and RSX have been popular in automobile racing.

In 1987 and 1988, the Integra won two consecutive IMSA International Sedan series manufacturers' championships, while Parker Johnstone won drivers' championship in the same years driving the Integra.

In 1992, the Integra was used in Formula One as a safety car at the Canadian Grand Prix.

Realtime Racing used the Integra Type R and later the RSX Type-S to compete in the SCCA World Challenge Touring Car class, winning six consecutive titles from 1997 to 2002. The BTC-T version of the Integra was very successful in the British Touring Car Championship, winning 27 races and becoming the champion in 2005 and 2006, despite being only entered by privateer teams. The Integra also won the Asian Touring Car Series in 2003, 2004, 2009 and 2010.

== Sales ==
Calendar year	US
1986	27,807
1987	54,757
1988	57,468
1989	77,423
1990	83,559
1991	64,755
1992	55,174
1993	58,757
1994	67,426
1995	61,316
1996	46,966
1997	38,331
1998	34,904
1999	26,184
2000	25,975
2001	13,376
2002	19
2022	13,027
2023	32,090
2024	24,398
2025	20,178

== See also ==
- BTC-T Honda Integra Type R
