= Davis DA-1 =

DA-1

General information
- Type: Civil utility aircraft
- Manufacturer: Davis Aircraft Corp
- Designer: Leeon D. Davis
- Number built: 1

History
- First flight: 24 May 1958

The Davis DA-1 was a light aircraft designed in the United States in the 1950s which never progressed beyond the prototype stage. Davis tried to bring the plane to market as a certified aircraft (his goal was a selling price of under $10,000), but was not successful.

== Design and development ==
Davis constructed his DA-1 starting on 24 April 1957. It was a strut-braced high-wing single-engine all-aluminum airplane designed around the new Lycoming O-360 engine. The fixed-nosegear-equipped piston-engine DA-1 was of otherwise conventional configuration, but its V-tail was similar to that of the contemporary Beechcraft Bonanza, whose high cruise speed was attributed partly to its use of that empennage type.

Wings and tail surfaces of the DA-1 used external heat treated ribs; those surfaces were non-tapered (i.e. of constant chord).

Power for the DA-1 was a horizontally opposed Lycoming O-360 of 180 hp (134 kW), which gave a top speed of 125 mph (201 km/h).

== Operational history ==
Initial test flights showed that there was not enough elevator authority with full flaps, and the plane was very loud. Soundproofing, and aerodynamic modifications were applied.

== Specifications ==
Data from Sport Aviation

General characteristics

- Crew: One pilot
- Capacity: 4 passengers
- Length: 22 ft 3 in (6.78 m)
- Wingspan: 32 ft 0 in (9.76 m)
- Wing area: 167 sq ft (15.5 m^{2})
- Empty weight: 1,200 lb (545 kg)
- Gross weight: 2,370 lb (1,080 kg)
- Powerplant: 1 × Lycoming O-360 , 180 hp (134 kW)

Performance

- Maximum speed: 125 mph (201 km/h, 109 kn)
- Range: 475 mi (764 km, 413 nmi)
