= Honda CR-X =

Sport compact car by Honda (1983–1991)

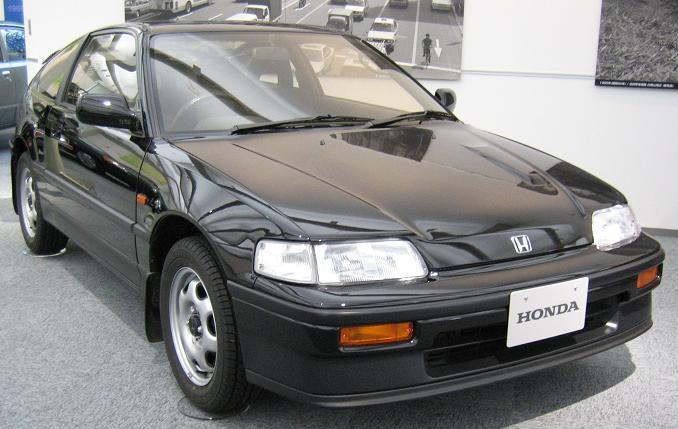

Overview
- Manufacturer: Honda
- Also called: Honda Ballade Sports CR-X (Japan); Honda Civic CRX
- Production: 1983–1991
- Model years: 1984–1991
- Assembly: Japan: Suzuka Plant, Suzuka, Mie

Body and chassis
- Class: Sport compact
- Body style: 3-door liftback
- Layout: Front-engine, front-wheel-drive
- Related: Honda Civic

Chronology
- Successor: Honda CR-X del Sol

The Honda CR-X (Note: styled in some markets as Honda CRX) (originally launched as the Honda Ballade Sports CR-X in Japan) is a sport-compact car manufactured by Honda from 1983 until 1991. Nearly 400,000 were produced. The first-generation CRX was marketed in some regions outside Japan as the Honda Civic CRX. Although there are many supposed definitions for the initialism CR-X, the most widely accepted is "Civic Renaissance Experimental". It was marketed as part of the Civic (and briefly Ballade) model ranges.

In North America, the CRX was marketed as an economy sport two-seat vehicle while Japanese and European market cars came with a 2+2 seating arrangement, described by Honda as a "one-mile seat" for emergency use. Redesigned for the 1988 model year and produced until 1991, the front-wheel-drive CR-X was popular for its performance, nimble handling, and good fuel economy. The CR-X was replaced by the del Sol, which was marketed as a CR-X in some markets.

== First generation ==
First generation
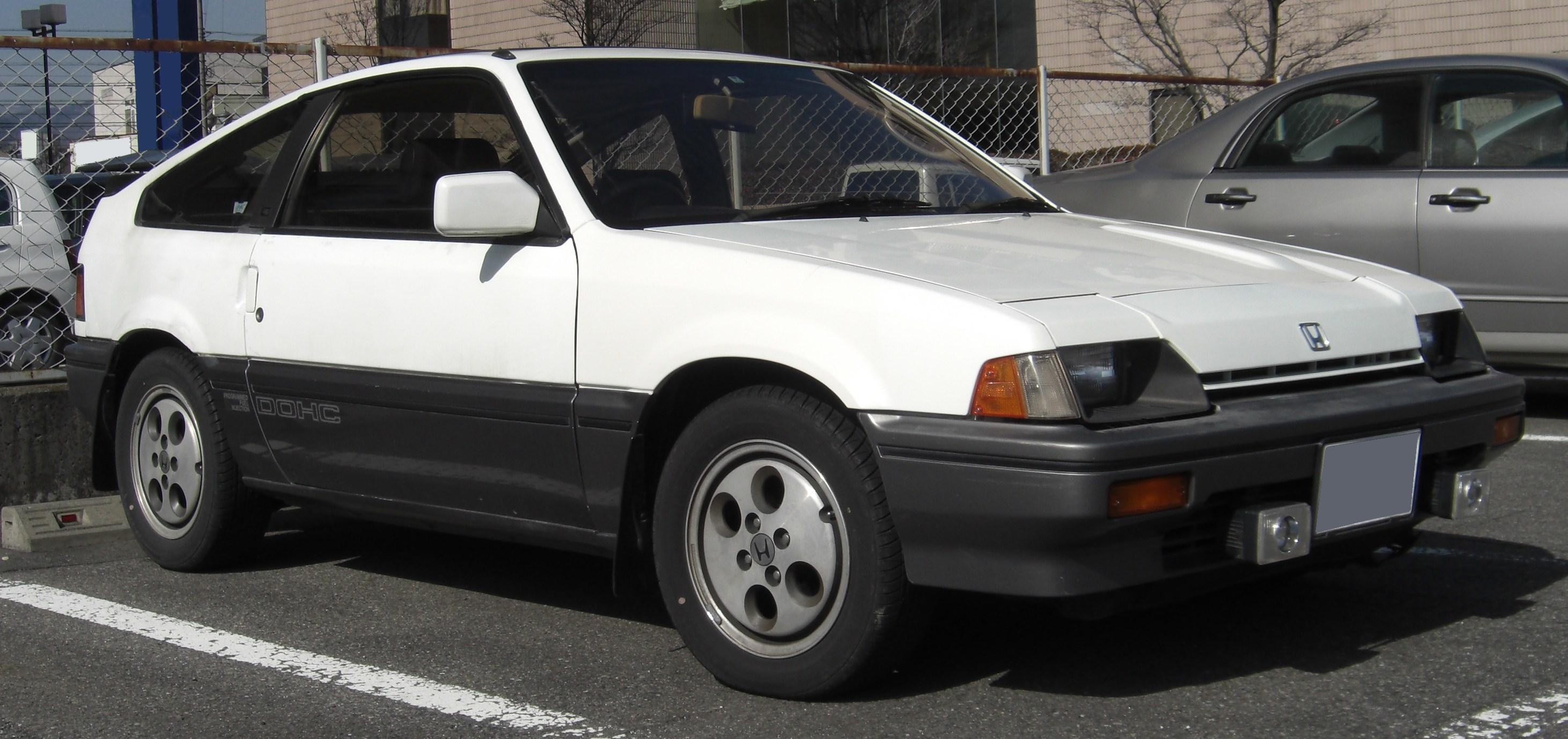

Overview
- Also called: Honda Ballade Sports CR-X; Honda Civic CRX
- Production: 1983–1987
- Model years: 1984–1987
- Designer: Osamu Akimoto, Shinya Iwakura

Powertrain
- Engine: 1.3 L EV1 I4; 1.5 L EW1/D15A2/A3 I4; 1.5 L EW3/4/5 I4; 1.6 L ZC1/D16A1 DOHC I4
- Transmission: 5-speed manual; 3-speed automatic

Dimensions
- Wheelbase: 2,200 mm (86.6 in)
- Length: 3,675 mm (144.7 in)
- Width: 1,625 mm (64.0 in)
- Height: 1,290 mm (50.8 in)
- Curb weight: 760–860 kg (1,676–1,896 lb)

=== Overview ===
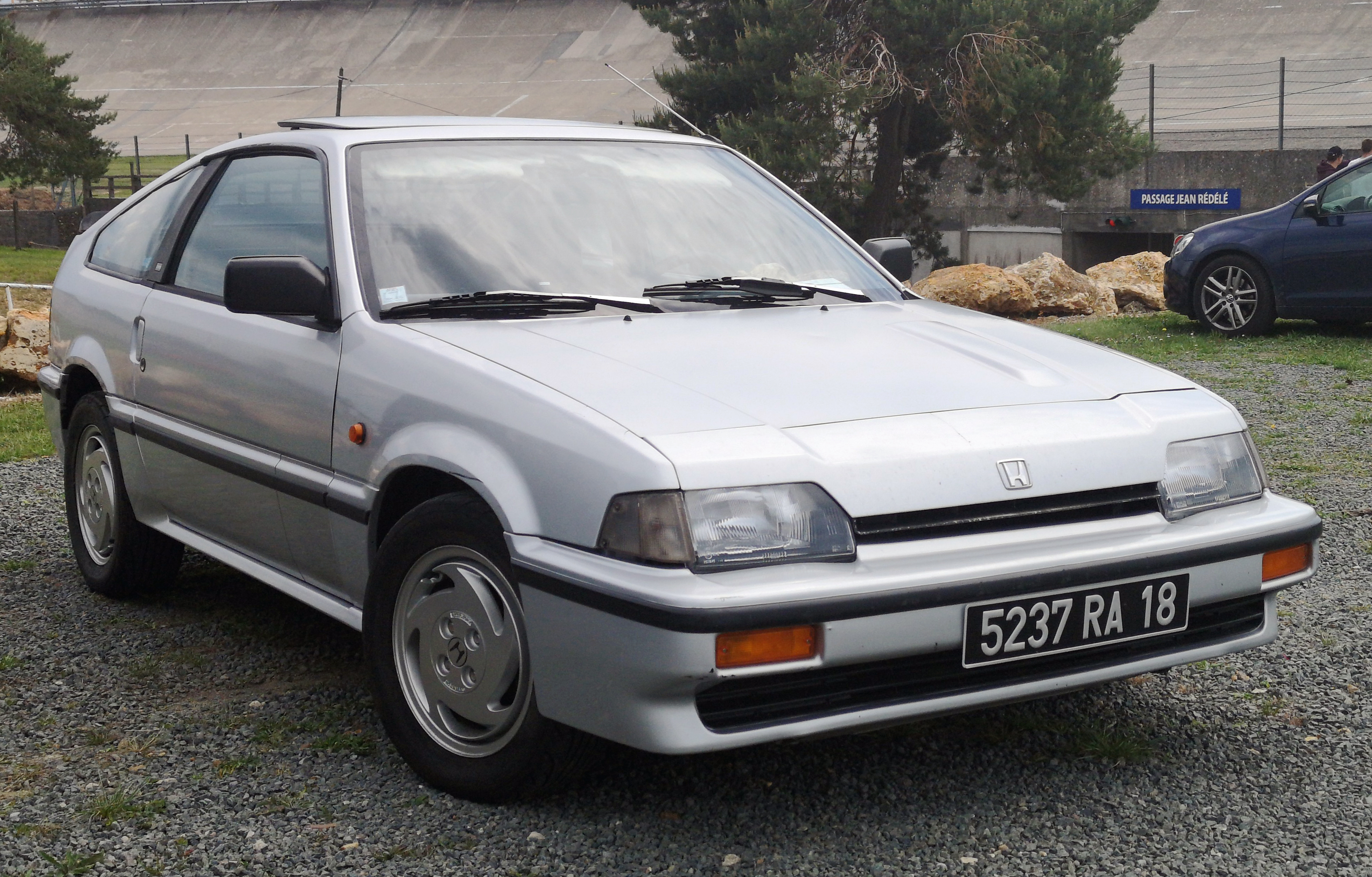
1987 Honda CRX 1.6i-16 (Europe)

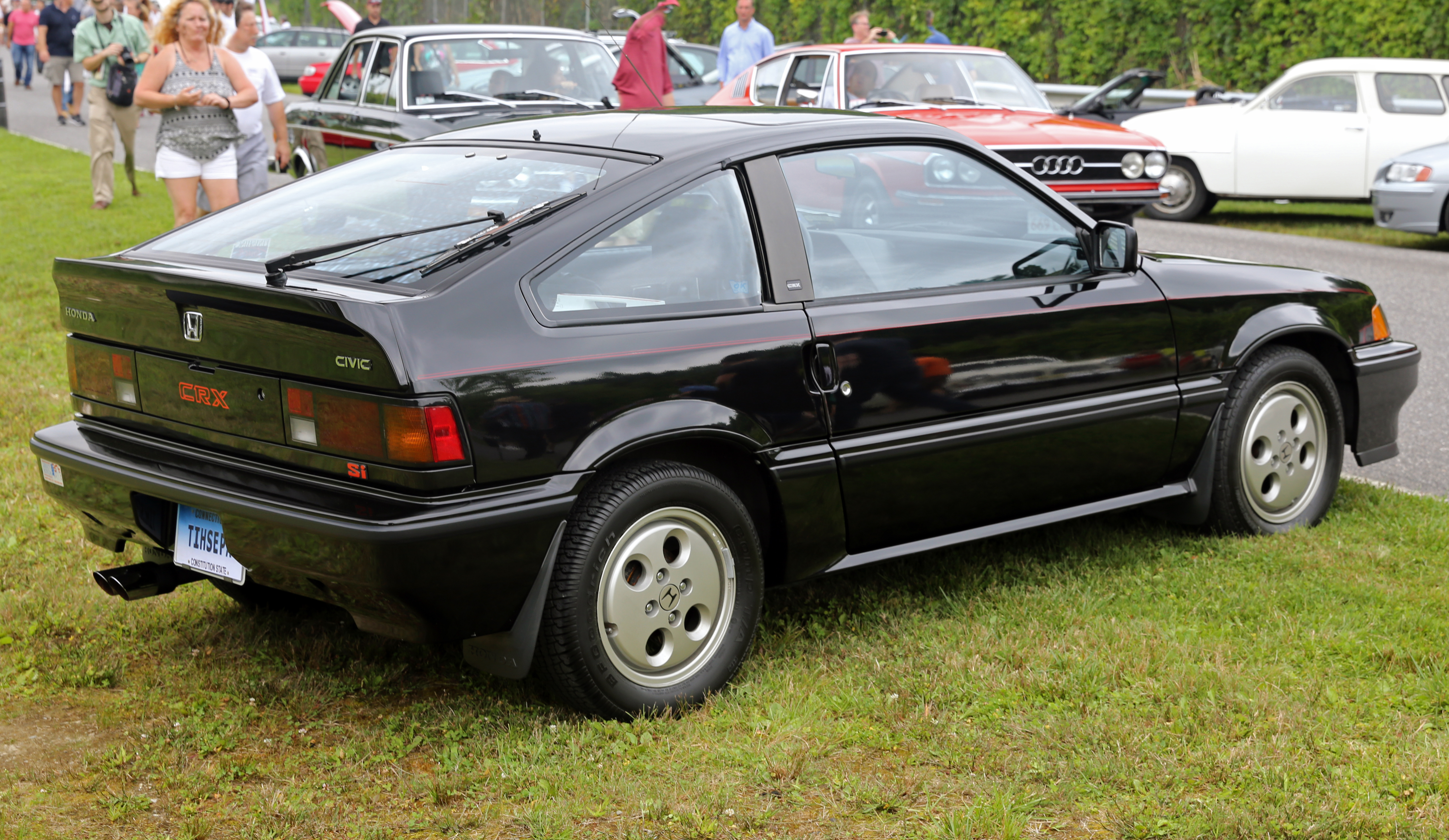
1987 Honda CRX Si (US)

In 1983 for the 1984 model year, Honda introduced an all-new two-seater that shared the drivetrain with the third-generation Civic but offered unique styling and interior furnishings. At its introduction, the CR-X was available in Japan through Honda Verno dealership sales channels, and accompanied the Vigor, the Quint, and the Prelude. The base model CR-X came with a 1.3-litre carbureted 4-cylinder engine while the flagship offered a 1.5-litre fuel-injected 4-cylinder engine. A digital instrumentation option was also available.

In North America, the CRX was marketed in two versions: economy and sport. The economy model used a new aluminum 1.3-liter CVCC four-cylinder engine. The sportier model featured an aluminum 1.5-liter 12-valve engine and was available with either a 5-speed manual or a 3-speed automatic transmission. The Digital instrument or roof ventilation hatch option were not available.

For 1985, Honda North America replaced the economy model with an HF (high fuel) model featuring a 1.5-liter engine which uses an aluminum block but the 1984 CVCC cylinder head (two valves per cylinder) instead of the new aluminum head with three valves per cylinder. In spring 1985, Honda introduced an Si (Sports, injected) model featuring a more powerful 1.5-liter SOHC PGM-FI four-cylinder engine. The Si model included a power sunroof, standard dual remote exterior mirrors, rear wiper, 13-inch alloy wheels and an Si-exclusive ducktail spoiler for the hatch.

For 1986, Honda updated the CRX with new aerodynamic headlights. The Si received body color matched lower cladding, a revised rear spoiler, new bumper covers and 14-inch alloy wheels. The interior was upgraded and added a center console with cassette tape storage. 1987 was virtually unchanged from 1986 and would be the final year of the first-generation CRX.

=== Inspiration ===
The CR-X design was inspired by the Alfa Romeo GT Junior Zagato which the Honda CR-X designer owned.

=== Japanese and European market drivetrain ===
The Japanese Si and European 1.6i-16 models came with a 1.6-litre 16-valve DOHC 4-cylinder engine putting out 135 PS (99 kW; 133 hp) in the UK-spec model and 140 PS (103 kW; 138 hp) in the JDM model. Though similar versions of the same engine, the Japanese Si engine was stamped ZC, while the European engine was stamped ZC1.

=== Fuel economy ===
The original 1.3-liter car (chassis code AE532) had an EPA highway mileage rating of 52 miles per U.S. gallon (4.5 L/100 km; 62 mpg_{‑imp}) in 1984 and was reported to often achieve over 70 miles per U.S. gallon (3.4 L/100 km; 84 mpg_{‑imp}) in favorable driving conditions. The later 1.5-liter American-market CRX HF (high fuel economy) model (chassis codes EC1 and AF) could also reliably achieve very good gas mileage, more than a decade before gas-electric hybrids appeared on the market, and at no price premium over the base model; the 1.5-liter is rated by the U.S. Environmental Protection Agency (EPA) (under the new rating system) at 42 miles per U.S. gallon (5.6 L/100 km; 50 mpg_{‑imp}) city and 51 miles per U.S. gallon (4.6 L/100 km; 61 mpg_{‑imp}) highway.

=== U.S. model curb weights ===
Year	CRX		CRX HF	CRX Si
Year	Manual	Automatic	Manual	Manual
1984	1,819 lb (825 kg)			-
1985	1,819 lb (825 kg)		1,713 lb (777 kg)	1,953 lb (886 kg)
'86-'87	1,865 lb (846 kg)	1,898 lb (861 kg)	1,713 lb (777 kg)	1,978 lb (897 kg)

== Second generation ==
Second generation
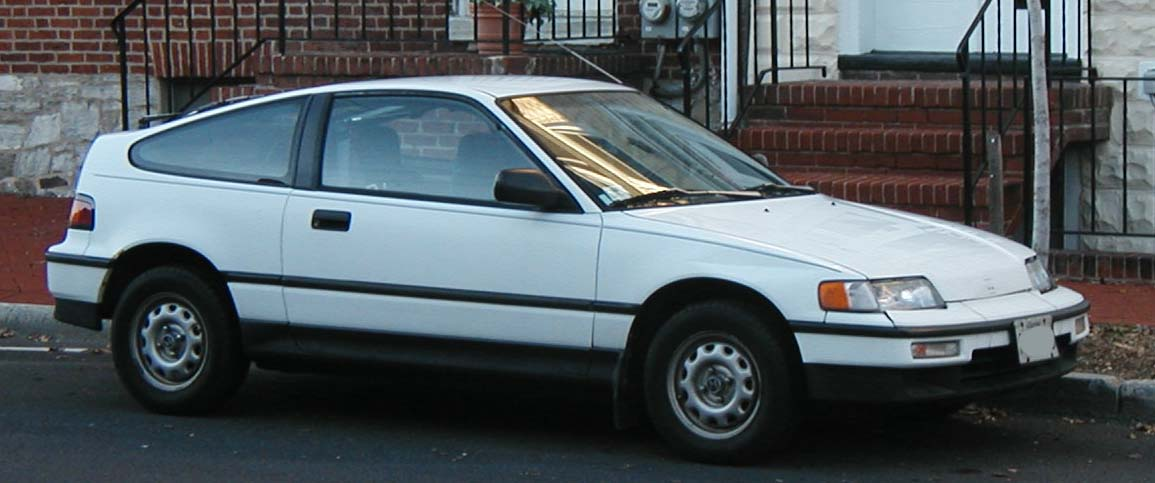
- 1988–1991 Honda CR-X

Overview
- Production: 1987–1991
- Model years: 1988–1991

Powertrain
- Engine: 1.4 L D14A1 I4; 1.5 L D15B I4; 1.6 L D16A I4; 1.6 L D16ZC I4; 1.6 L B16A VTEC I4
- Transmission: 5-speed manual 4-speed automatic (base model only)

Dimensions
- Wheelbase: 2,301 mm (90.6 in)
- Length: 3,759 mm (148 in) (1990–91); 3,754 mm (147.8 in) (1988–89)
- Width: 1,674 mm (65.9 in) (1990–91); 1,669 mm (65.7 in) (1988–89)
- Height: 1,273 mm (50.1 in) (1990–91); 1,270 mm (50 in) (1988–89)
- Curb weight: 820–1,000 kg (1,808–2,205 lb)

=== Overview ===
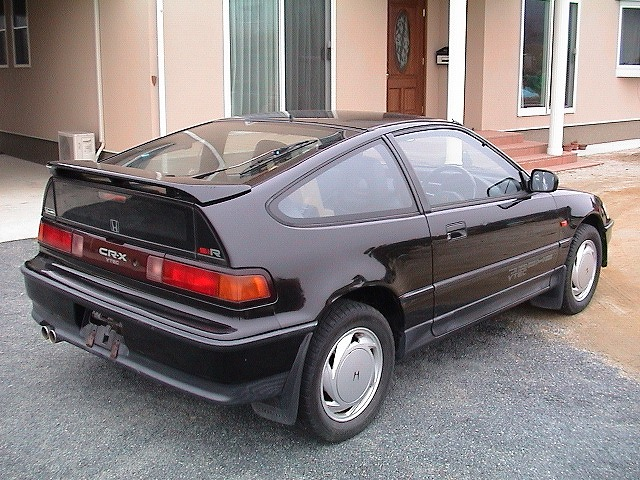
Honda CR-X SiR

The Honda CR-X was completely redesigned by late 1987 for the 1988 model year. The wheelbase increased 10 cm (4 in) overall, length increased by 3.2 in (81 mm) and width is nearly 2 in (51 mm) wider than the previous model. The suspension was completely redesigned. Honda abandoned the original torsion bar in the front and beam axle with trailing link in the rear in favor of a 4-wheel double wishbone suspension. The larger design and revised suspension brought improvements in handling as well passenger and cargo space versus the previous generation.

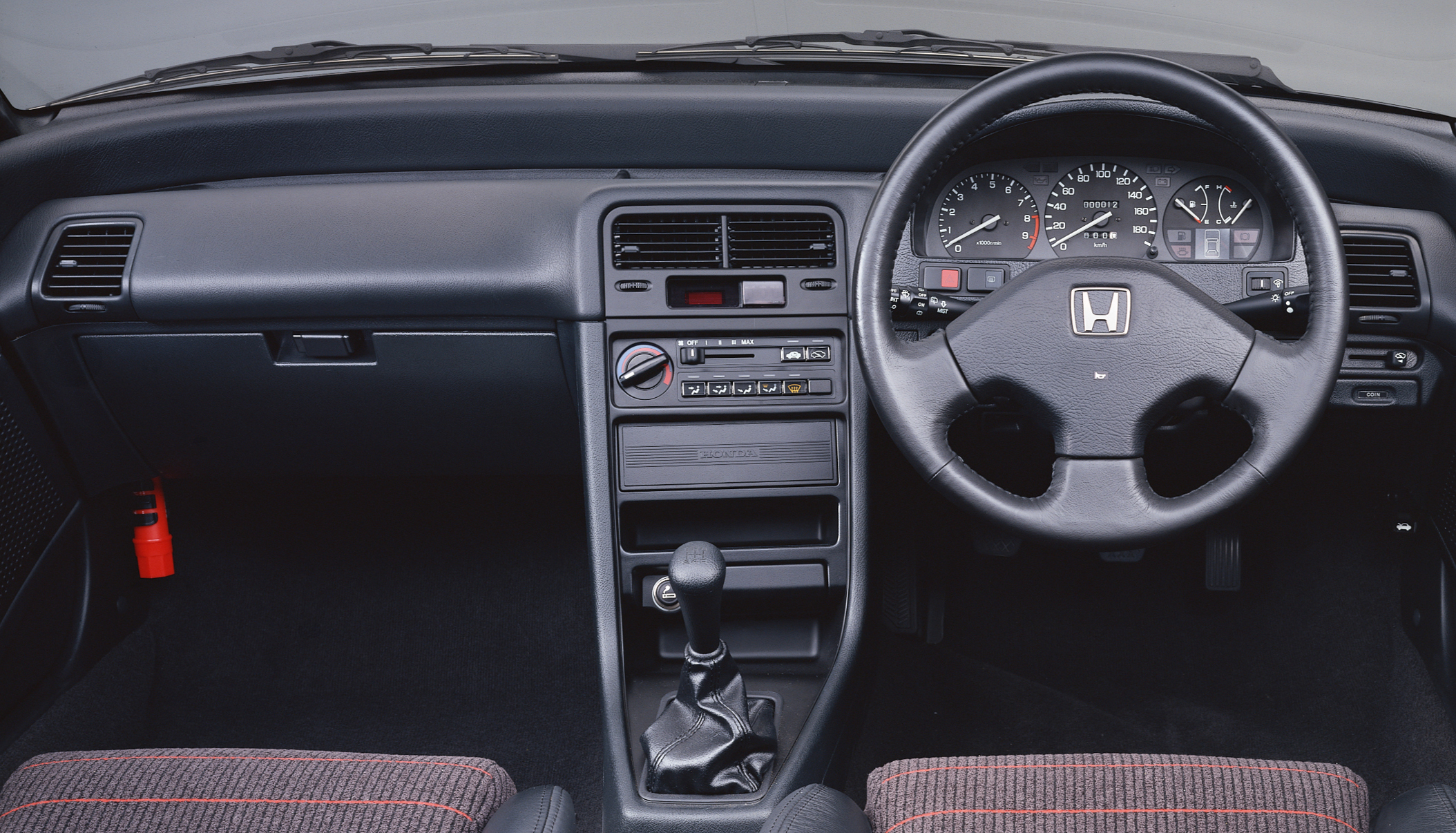
1988 Honda CR-X Si interior

The CR-X received a mild refresh for the 1990 model year. The VTEC equipped models also received a makeover with updated bumpers, lights, hood, brakes, suspension and dashboard design amongst other features. Additionally, some of these design changes were added to the concurrent non-VTEC models.

One of the options for the Japanese Domestic Market (JDM) CR-X was a glass roof, a fixed glass panel which stretched from the top of the windshield to the top of the hatch opening. Relatively common in Japan, these are sought-after models in other markets.

=== Japanese and European market drivetrain ===
Outside of North America, the second generation CR-X was available with a 1.5-litre SOHC 4-cylinder engine or an updated version of the 1.6-litre DOHC 4-cylinder (ZC) engine. Most variants were fitted with fuel injection as standard. European/general market cars were also available with a single-cam 1.6-litre engine with 16 valves.

In September 1989, Honda added the 1.6-litre 16-valve DOHC VTEC 4-cylinder B16A engine to the lineup outside of North America. The VTEC (variable valve timing and lift electronic control) engine provided increased power at high engine speeds while still allowing low fuel consumption and better idling at lower revs. The B16A produces 160 PS (118 kW; 158 hp) in the Japanese SiR model and 150 PS (110 kW; 148 hp) in the B16A1 that came in the European 1.6i-VT model. The CR-X was the second car to receive a DOHC VTEC engine, shortly after the Honda Integra XSi.

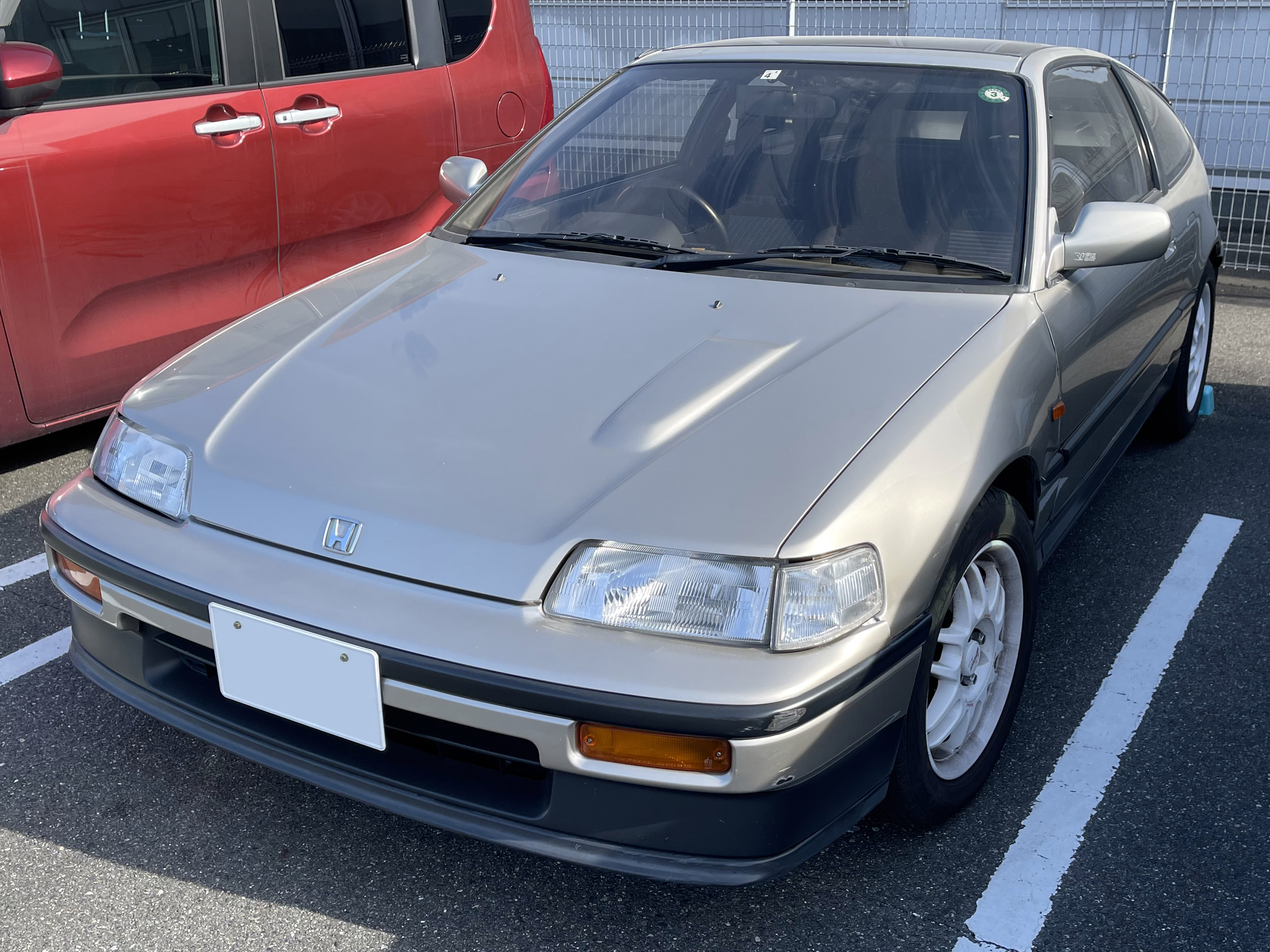
Honda CR-X Si (EF7) with the bump on one side of the hood

The CR-X equipped with the 1.6-litre DOHC four-cylinder engine or the VTEC variant of the same came with a different bonnet since the twin-cam engines were taller and required additional bonnet clearances in comparison to the single-cam engines. The 1.6-litre DOHC engine was only slightly taller than the 1.6-litre SOHC engine and required a different bonnet with a bump on one side which offered the additional necessary clearance to clear the cam gear cover. Cars equipped with a 1.6-litre DOHC VTEC 4-cylinder engine came with a bonnet that was raised across most of the engine bay to offer additional overall clearance for the taller engine.

In some LHD European markets, there was also the option of the D14A1 engine which featured twin carburetors and was also offered with a four-speed automatic gearbox.

Anti-lock brakes was optional on the Japanese SiR and came standard on the UK 1.6i-VT model, but never came on the LHD European 1.6i-VT.

Second-generation European and Japanese CR-X engines
European market
Engine	Chassis code	Horsepower	Torque	Cat.	Years
1.4 L (1,396 cc) D14A1 SOHC 16V, twin-carb	EE6	90 PS (66 kW; 89 hp) at 6,300 rpm	112 N⋅m (83 lb⋅ft) at 4,500 rpm	–	1989-1991
1.6 L (1,590 cc) D16A6 SOHC 16V, PGM-FI	ED9	105 PS (77 kW; 104 hp) at 5,700 rpm	130 N⋅m (96 lb⋅ft) at 4,600 rpm	●	1987-1988
1.6 L (1,590 cc) D16A7 SOHC 16V, PGM-FI	ED9	117 PS (86 kW; 115 hp) at 5,900 rpm	136 N⋅m (100 lb⋅ft) at 4,800 rpm	–	1987-1991
1.6 L (1,590 cc) D16A8/D16Z5 DOHC 16V, PGM-FI	ED9	124 PS (91 kW; 122 hp) at 6,800 rpm	140 N⋅m (103 lb⋅ft) at 5,700 rpm	●	1987-1991
1.6 L (1,590 cc) D16A9 DOHC 16V, PGM-FI	ED9	130 PS (96 kW; 128 hp) at 6,800 rpm	143 N⋅m (105 lb⋅ft) at 5,700 rpm	–	1987-1991
1.6 L (1,595 cc) B16A1 DOHC VTEC 16V, PGM-FI	EE8	150 PS (110 kW; 148 hp) at 7,600 rpm	144 N⋅m (106 lb⋅ft) at 7,100 rpm	●	1989-1991
Japanese market
1.5 L (1,493 cc) D15B SOHC 16V,	EF6	105 PS (77 kW; 104 hp) at 6,500 rpm	129 N⋅m (95 lb⋅ft) at 4,500 rpm		1989-1992
1.6 L (1,590 cc) ZC DOHC 16V, MPFI	EF7	130 PS (96 kW; 128 hp) at 6,800 rpm	144 N⋅m (106 lb⋅ft) at 5,700 rpm		1987-1991
1.6 L (1,595 cc) B16A DOHC VTEC 16V, PGM-FI	EF8	160 PS (118 kW; 158 hp) at 7,600 rpm	152 N⋅m (112 lb⋅ft) at 7,000 rpm		1989-1992

=== US market ===
In the US, three different trim levels were available: The standard (unlabeled, sometimes called the "DX") equipped with the 1.5-liter 16-valve dual-point fuel injection 4-cylinder D15B2 engine, the HF ("high fuel efficiency") model with the 1.5-liter 8-valve multi-point fuel injection (MPFI) 4-cylinder D15B6 engine, or the Si (sport injected) model with the 1.6-liter 16-valve MPFI 4-cylinder D16A6 engine. The base model was available with either a 5-speed manual transmission or a 4-speed automatic transmission while the HF and Si only offered a 5-speed manual transmission. A modification made to the rear on all second-generation vehicles is a heavily-stippled black glass panel installed on the upper half of the rear of the vehicle, above the tail lights which aided in rearward visibility.

The two lower trims had adjustable headrests, while the Si had high-back bucket seats. Air conditioning as well as the audio system (radio, speakers, and antenna) were dealer-installed options on all models. The Si model came with a power-sliding sunroof, a rear wiper and 14-inch alloy wheels. Underneath, the Si model was equipped with a rear anti-sway bar along with variable-ratio rack-and-pinion steering. The 90-91 Si models had 4-wheel disc brakes instead of front disc and rear drum. There were a total of six colors offered each model year. Four color options were available on the CRX and CRX Si and two color options were available for the CRX HF. Color availability would vary based on trim package and the interior color would depend on the exterior color choice.

Second generation US CRX color options
Color name	1988			1989			1990			1991		
Color name	CRX HF	CRX	CRX Si	CRX HF	CRX	CRX Si	CRX HF	CRX	CRX Si	CRX HF	CRX	CRX Si
Blade silver metallic	N/A	X	X	N/A	X	X	N/A	N/A	N/A	N/A	N/A	N/A
Barbados yellow	N/A	N/A	X	N/A	N/A	X	N/A	N/A	X	N/A	N/A	N/A
Superior blue metallic	X	X	N/A	X	X	N/A	N/A	N/A	N/A	N/A	N/A	N/A
Polar white	X	X	N/A	X	X	N/A	X	X	X	N/A	N/A	N/A
Rio red	N/A	X	X	N/A	X	X	X	N/A	X	X	N/A	X
Flint black metallic	N/A	N/A	X	N/A	N/A	X	N/A	X	X	N/A	X	X
Torino red pearl	N/A	N/A	N/A	N/A	N/A	N/A	N/A	X	N/A	N/A	X	N/A
Celestial blue pearl	N/A	N/A	N/A	N/A	N/A	N/A	N/A	X	N/A	N/A	X	N/A
Frost white	N/A	N/A	N/A	N/A	N/A	N/A	N/A	N/A	N/A	X	X	X
Tahitian green pearl	N/A	N/A	N/A	N/A	N/A	N/A	N/A	N/A	N/A	N/A	N/A	X

==== Model updates ====
1988

- First year of the second-generation CRX.

1989

- Si and base model change to door-mounted seatbelts to comply with federal regulations. Revision due to automatic seatbelt requirements.
- Si model's horsepower increased to 108 bhp (81 kW) (105 bhp (78 kW) in 1988) due to a revised camshaft.

1990

- HF model change to door-mounted seatbelts
- Minor changes to headlights, bumpers and taillights
- Instrument cover is now slightly more rounded
- Hazard switch relocated to the dashboard
- Si models now come equipped with four-wheel disc brakes
- Si models receive updated 14-inch alloy wheels
- Blade silver color is discontinued and replaced by Torino red
- Polar white color is now offered on the Si model
- Superior blue color is discontinued and replaced by Celestial blue

1991

- Barbados yellow color is replaced by Tahitian green on the Si model.
- Polar white color is replaced by Frost white.
- Final year of the second-generation CRX.

==== Production by model year ====
Model	1988	1989	1990	1991	Total
Honda CRX HF	12,281	9,330	7,544	8,863	38,018
Honda CRX	18,995	15,714	16,993	17,111	68,813
Honda CRX Si	17,886	18,505	13,876	14,295	64,562
Total	49,162	43,549	38,413	40,269	171,393
Source					

=== Curb weights ===
Year	CRX		CRX HF	CRX Si
Year	Manual	Automatic	Manual	Manual
1988	1,922 lb (872 kg)		1,819 lb (825 kg)	2,017 lb (915 kg)
1989	2,048 lb (929 kg)		1,834 lb (832 kg)	2,138 lb (970 kg)
1990–1991	2,103 lb (954 kg)		1,967 lb (892 kg)	2,174 lb (986 kg)

== Third generation ==
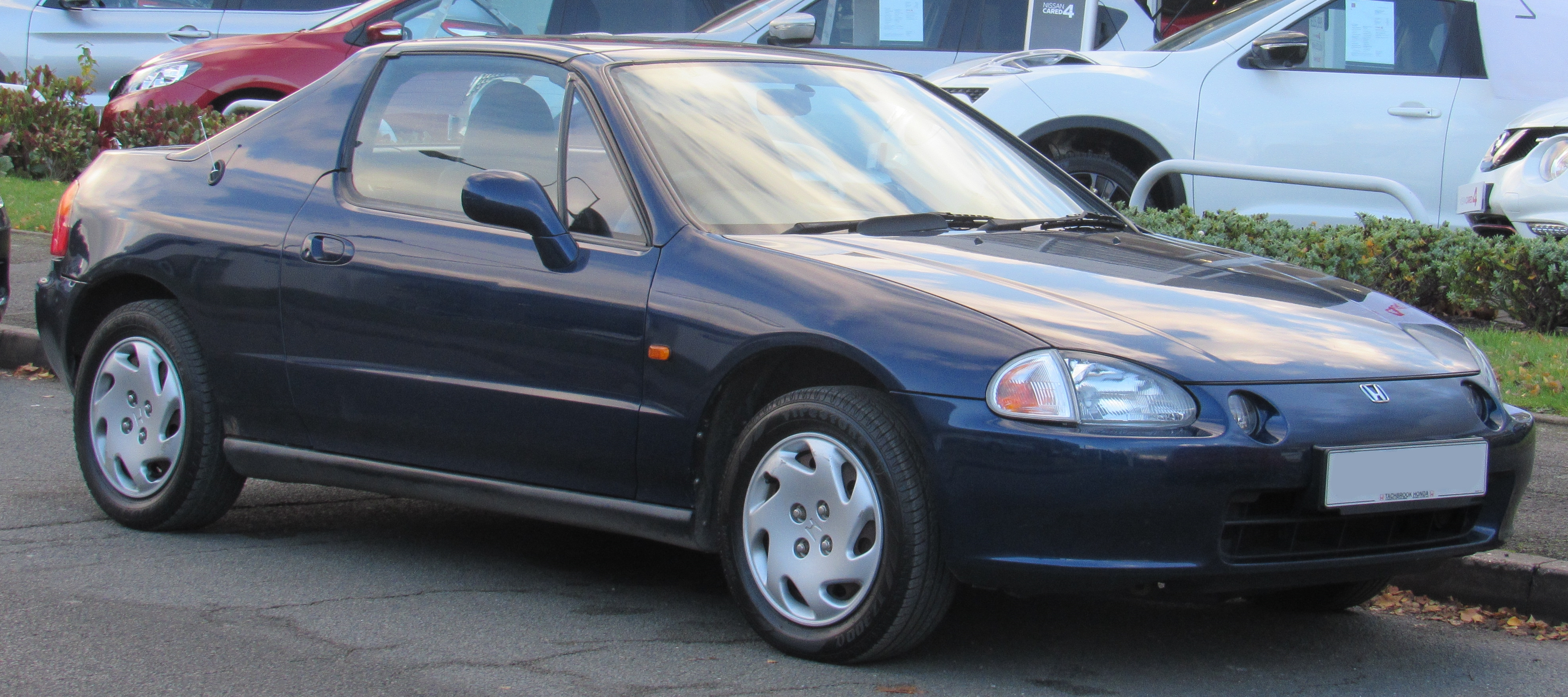
1992 Honda CR-X del Sol

In 1992, Honda replaced the CR-X with a new, targa topped, Civic-based model called the Honda CR-X del Sol. The CR-X del Sol was badged as the Civic del Sol and later the del Sol in some markets, and known simply as the CR-X in others. It is because of this that the del Sol is considered by some enthusiasts to be the "third-generation CR-X". The del Sol came in three trim lines: S in the US / VXi in Japan, later VGi), Si in the US / ESi in Europe, and VTEC in the US / VTi in Europe; the equivalent JDM SiR model which featured a 1.6-liter 170 PS (125 kW) B16 SiR-II DOHC VTEC four-cylinder engine. Production of the del Sol ended in 1997 in North America, elsewhere in 1998 and thus, the CR-X line was retired.

== Comparison to other Honda vehicles ==
Articles on the first-generation Honda Insight have compared its appearance to that of the 1984–1991 CRX, with which it shares the Kammback aerodynamic design.

In 2010, thirteen years after the end of CRX production, Honda released the CR-Z, regarded as the spiritual successor to the CRX.

== Awards ==
=== First generation ===
- 1984: The Honda CRX is named Motor Trend's "Import Car of the Year"
- 1985: The Honda CRX is included in Car and Driver's 10Best

Consumer reporter David Horowitz tested the 1984 CRX's fuel economy claim in a "Commercial Challenge" on his TV series Fight Back! commercials for the CRX claimed it could reach 60 miles per gallon fuel economy; according to Horowitz's test, it bested that figure, reaching 65 miles per gallon, and passed the test.

=== Second generation ===
- 1988: The Honda CRX is included in Car and Driver's 10Best
- 1988: The Honda CRX Si is named Motor Trend's "Import Car of the Year"
- 1988: The Honda CRX Si was named Road & Track as "One of the Ten Best Cars"
- 1990: The Honda CRX is named Motor Trend's "Import Car of the Year"

== Safety ==
In Australia, the 1988–1991 CR-X was assessed in the Used Car Safety Ratings 2006 as providing "significantly worse than average" protection for its occupants in the event of side impact. Both versions of the CR-X got good safety marks (4 and 5 stars) in the NHTSA Crash Test Results for 1997 US NCAP.

The US version of the second-generation CR-X employed the use of side-impact door beams on some models. These models can be identified by the mounting position of the safety belts. If the belt is mounted in the door, the beams are present. If the belt is mounted in the body, there is no additional reinforcement. 1988 and 1989 HFs along with 1988 Sis and base models have the B-pillar mounted restraints, like all versions sold outside of the US.

=== United States ===
The National Highway Traffic Safety Administration (NHTSA) in the United States has determined frontal crash test ratings of Honda CRX of different model years.

Model year	Make	Model	Type	Curb weight	Frontal driver rating	Frontal passenger rating
1984	Honda	Civic	CRX	1,882 lb (854 kg)		
1989	Honda	Civic	CRX	2,310 lb (1,048 kg)		

== Motorsport ==
Honda CRX Si at an autocross

Like the Civic, due to the wide availability of parts, the CR-X is popular for motorsport usage.

=== Honda CR-X Challenge ===
In the United Kingdom, there was a one-make series dedicated to the series 2 of the CR-X, which ran from 1988 to 1994.

A novelty of the series was the Celebrity Car (which was usually car #1). In the inaugural season, the likes of Roberto Moreno, Derek Warwick (who would go on to run a team, and briefly race, in the 1990 Season) and Patrick Head made appearances in the Celebrity Car.

=== Endurance Racing ===
The car contested the Nürburgring 24 Hours in 1986 and 1988 and scored a class podium in the 1989 Spa 24 Hours.

=== Twin-engine CRX ===
As featured in the May 1985 issue of Car and Driver, Project Synchronicity Honda CRX was a collaboration between American Honda and Racing Beat to install a second 1.5-liter engine with automatic transmission into the hatchback cargo area. The installation of the second powertrain "took six months and cost $20,000 dollars". Phase Two of the project was to have Racing Beat install two 1.8-liter engines with automatic transmissions from the Honda Accord into Synchronicity. The Honda CRX would be called Super Synchronicity because of the increase of performance from two larger engines. Both Honda Accord 1.8-liter powertrains were fuel injected and upgrades were made to the suspension. A Mugen body kit and upgraded wheels were also installed.

== Convertibles ==
The R. Straman Company of Costa Mesa, CA converted 310 Honda CRXs into convertibles from 1984 until 1987. The Straman-built CRX Spyder was the cover car on the July 1984 issue of Road & Track magazine.
