= Honda Civic (fifth generation) =

Motor vehicle model (1991–1995)

Honda Civic Fifth generation
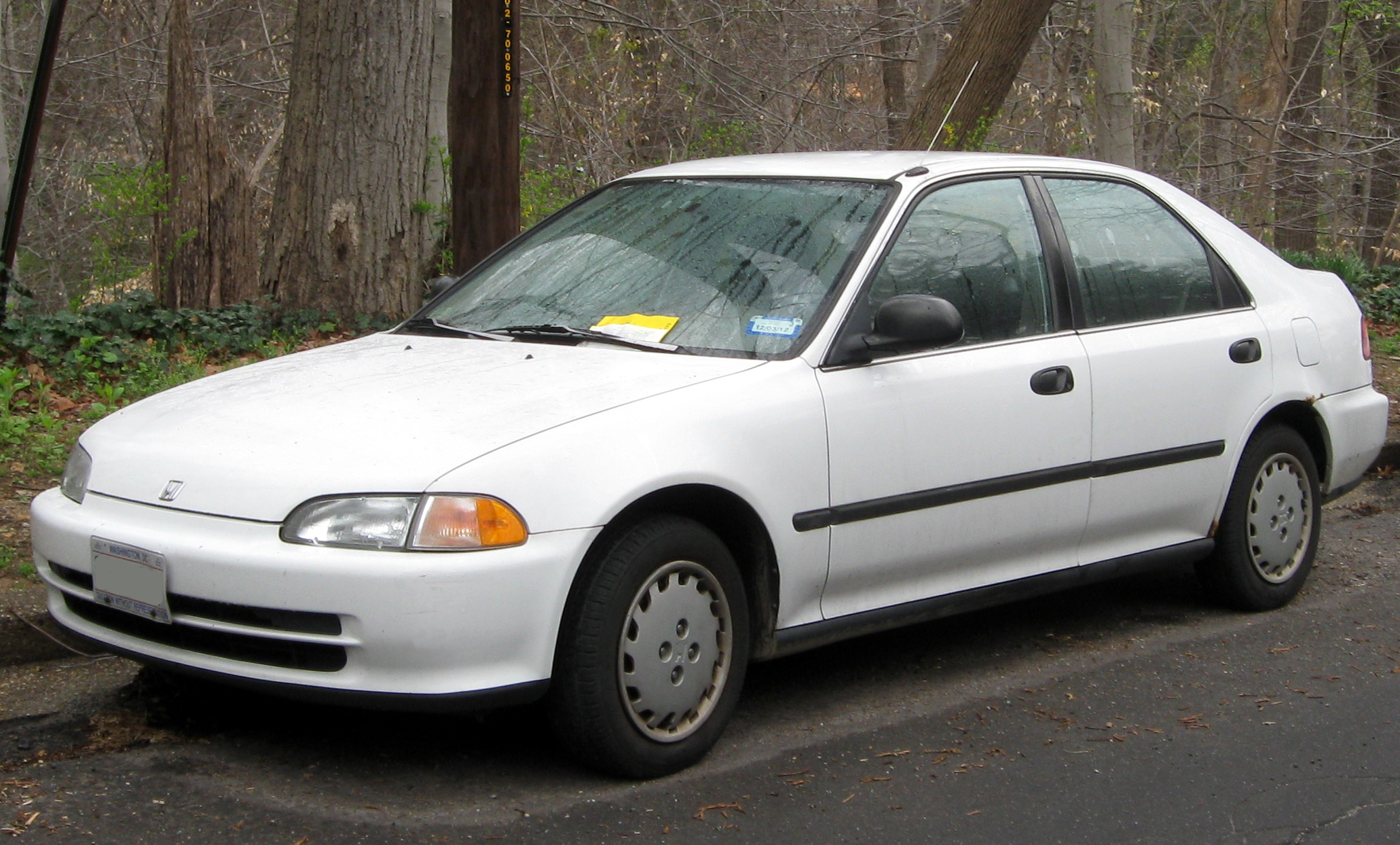
- 1995 Honda Civic sedan

Overview
- Manufacturer: Honda
- Model code: EG (hatchback); EH (sedan); EJ (coupe)
- Production: September 1991 – August 1995
- Model years: 1992–1995
- Assembly: Japan: Suzuka; Canada: Alliston, Ontario (HCM); Indonesia: North Jakarta; Malaysia: Johor Bahru; New Zealand: Nelson (Honda New Zealand); Pakistan: Lahore (Honda Atlas); Philippines: Santa Rosa, Laguna (Honda Cars Philippines); South Africa: (Mercedes-Benz South Africa); Taiwan: Hsinchu; Thailand: Ayutthaya; United States: East Liberty, Ohio (ELAP)
- Designer: Kohichi Hirata (1988)

Body and chassis
- Class: Compact car
- Body style: 2-door coupé (EJ1/2/5); 3-door hatchback (EG3/6, EH2/3); 4-door sedan (EG8/9, EH9)
- Layout: Front-engine, front-wheel-drive Front-engine, four-wheel-drive
- Related: Honda Ballade; Honda City; Honda Concerto; Honda CR-X del Sol; Honda Domani; Honda Integra

Powertrain
- Engine: 1.3 L D13B2 I4; 1.5 L D15B7 I4; 1.5 L D15B2 I4; 1.5 L D15B3 I4; 1.5 L D15B8 I4; 1.5 L D15Z1 I4; 1.5 L D15Z3 I4; 1.6 L D16A SOHC I4; 1.6 L D16A8/9 DOHC I4; 1.6 L D16Z6 VTEC I4; 1.6 L D16Z9 VTEC SOHC I4; 1.6 L B16A1/B16A2 VTEC DOHC I4; 1.8 L B18B3 I4 (ZA only)
- Transmission: 4-speed S24A automatic 5-speed S20 A000 manual 5-speed S20 B000 manual

Dimensions
- Wheelbase: 101.4 in (2,576 mm) (hatchback); 103.2 in (2,621 mm) (coupé & sedan)
- Length: 160.2 in (4,069 mm) (hatchback); 172.8 in (4,389 mm) (coupé); 173.0 in (4,394 mm) (sedan)
- Width: 66.9 in (1,699 mm)
- Height: 50.7 in (1,288 mm) (hatchback); 50.9 in (1,293 mm) (coupé); 51.7 in (1,313 mm) (Sedan)
- Curb weight: 925–1,130 kg (2,039–2,491 lb)

Chronology
- Predecessor: Honda Civic (fourth generation)
- Successor: Honda Civic (sixth generation)

The fifth-generation Honda Civic is an automobile produced by Honda from 1991 until 1995. It debuted in Japan on September 9, 1991. At its introduction, it won the Car of the Year Japan award for the second time. Fifth-generation Civics were larger than their predecessors, had more aerodynamic bodies, and the wheelbase was increased to 257 cm (101.3 inches)—for the three-door hatchback—and to 262 cm (103.2 inches)—for the four-door sedan. The Civic Shuttle station wagon was not part of the fifth generation and was dropped for overseas markets, while the previous-generation wagon continued in Japan and Europe.

This generation of Civic used lightweight materials to create a fuel-efficient economy car. Compared to the previous generation, the cowl was raised, which allowed for more suspension travel. Along with that change, the ride became softer than that of the previous generation, which provided a more compliant ride at expense of crisper handling.

In addition, vehicles with the larger 1.6 L SOHC VTEC 125 PS (92 kW; 123 hp) engines such as the Si hatchback and EX coupe models found in the United States, provoked popularity of the (relatively) high-performance 1.6 L inline-four segment. In South Africa, the hatch and sedan models with the B18B3 engine from the Acura Integra RS were built to fill the gap left by the absence of the 1.6-liter DOHC VTEC B16A engine in the range.

== Body styles ==
=== Coupe ===
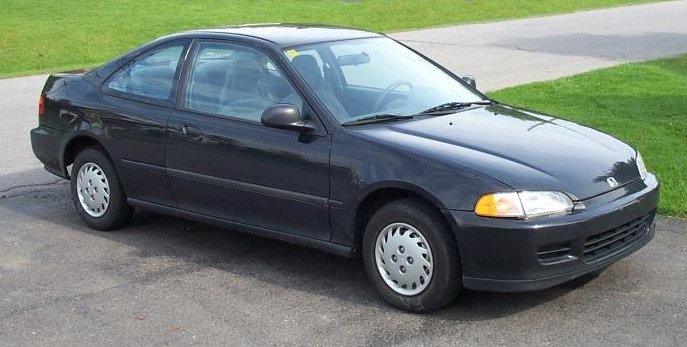

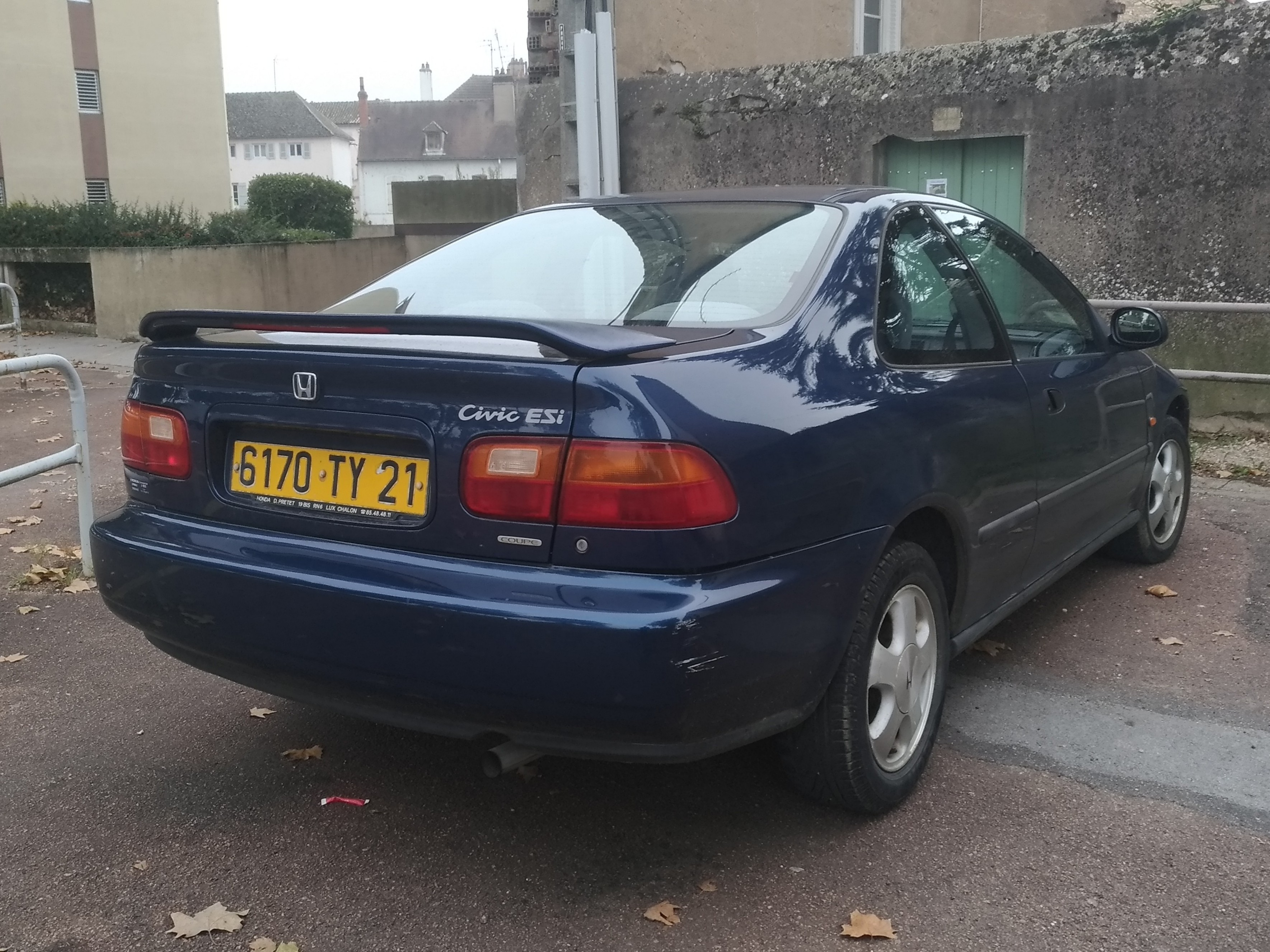
1995 Civic ESi Coupé

Trims available in the two-door coupé body style, introduced for the 1993 model year, were the DX (EJ2), EX, and EX-S (EJ1), for the United States Domestic Market (USDM), and the DX, DX "Special Edition" (EJ2), and Si (EJ1) for the Canadian Domestic Market (CDM). The coupé, built in both Canada and the United States, was also exported to European and Japanese markets. A left-hand drive version of the Civic Coupé was released as a limited edition in Japan, imported from the United States, to celebrate the tenth anniversary of the Honda Primo dealer network in 1994.

	USDM	CDM	Engine	Transmission	Features
EJ2	DX	DX	102 hp (76 kW) 1.5 L D15B7	Manual: S20 A000 Automatic: S24A	Driver's side door mirror Front chin spoiler/lip Rear defroster Power brakes Power steering (with AT only)
EJ2		DX "Special Edition" (1994-95 only)	102 hp (76 kW) 1.5 L D15B7	Manual: S20 A000 Automatic: S24A	AM/FM cassette player with 4-speaker sound system Wheelcovers Centre armrest console Clock Power steering Power mirrors
EJ1	EX	Si	125 hp (93 kW) 1.6 L D16Z6 VTEC	Manual: S20 B000 Automatic: S24A	AM/FM cassette player with AR (Acoustic Research) 6-speaker sound system (1994-95 only) Cruise control Wheelcovers on 14-inch (360 mm) wheels Clock Passenger's vanity mirror 9,000 RPM tachometer with 7,200 RPM redline Power steering Dual body-coloured power mirrors and door handles Power moonroof with tilt Cargo area light 21mm front stabilizer bar Dual front SRS (beginning 1994) USDM only: Power locks and windows
EJ1	EX-S (1993 only)		125 hp (93 kW) 1.6 L D16Z6 VTEC	Manual: S20 B000 Automatic: S24A	(O Package or Optional Package, single option available only on the EX) Dual front SRS AM/FM cassette player with AR (Acoustic Research) 6-speaker sound system

=== Hatchback ===
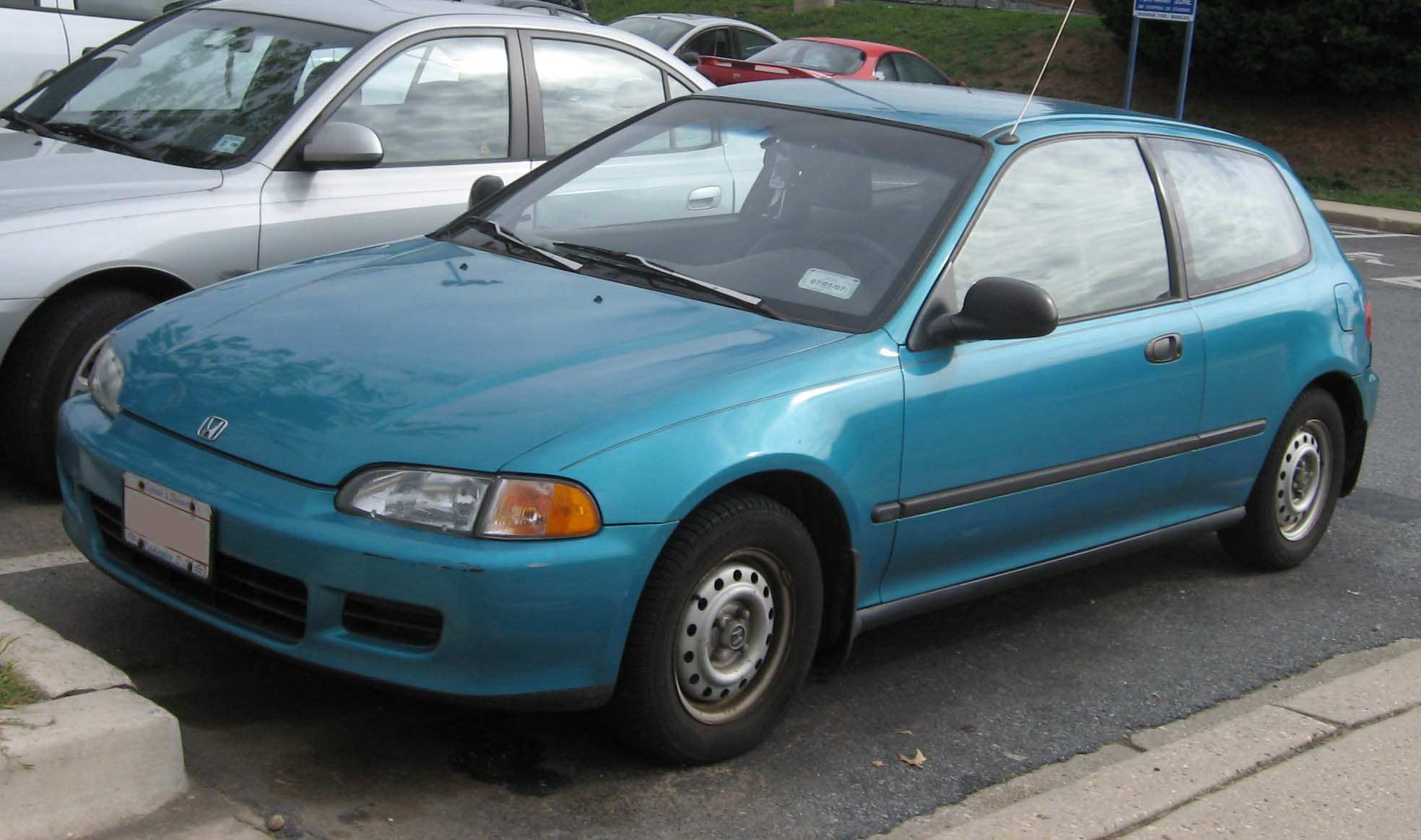
Civic DX hatchback

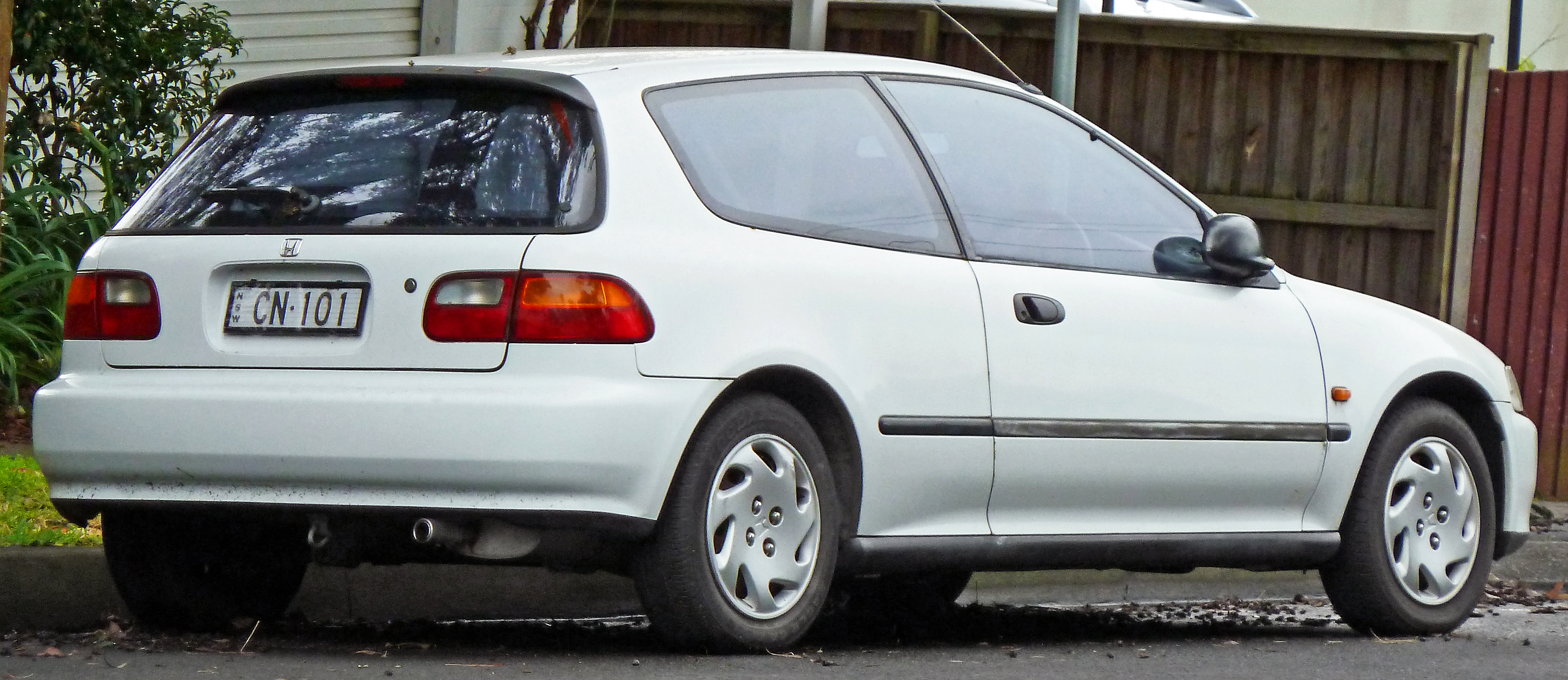
Civic Breeze hatchback

Introduced in late 1991, trims available in the hatchback body style in the U.S. and Canada were the CX, VX, DX (EH2 models) and Si (EH3), however the VX and Si models were discontinued in Canada after the 1993 model year, while the DX was discontinued after 1994 (leaving only the base CX model). With a total interior room (passenger and luggage) of 90 cu.ft., the hatchback was classified by the EPA of the U.S. as a subcompact car.

CX: The economical CX was the base model equipped with all-manual features, and power brakes. In the U.S., it came with the 8-valve 70 hp (52 kW) 1.5L D15B8 engine and a 5-speed manual transmission. With 42/48 miles per gallon (mpg) (city/hwy) [revised to 2008 EPA rating: 35/43 mpg city/hwy] or 40/47 mpg (city/hwy) [revised to 2008 EPA rating: 33/42 mpg city/hwy], the CX was the second most fuel-efficient Civic model of the fifth generation, after the VX. CX models in Canada came with the same 16-valve 102 hp 1.5L D15B7 engine as in the DX -model, but could also be ordered with a 4-speed automatic transmission which also came with power steering. The 1995 CDM CX models (sometimes colloquially referred to as the "CX-Plus") added the rear wiper/washer as a standard feature, and could be ordered with side mouldings and manual passenger-side mirror.

VX: During the late 1980s and the early 1990s, as a result of high gasoline prices and the consumer demand for relief, automobile companies, particularly Toyota and Honda competed to see who could field the most fuel efficient production automobile. The Civic VX was Honda's entry for 1992.

Fitted with the same manual transmission as the USDM CX, the VX was identical to the base model CX except that it gained improved fuel efficiency from various weight reduction methods such as reduced trim and molding, VX model-specific lightweight 13-inch aluminum alloy wheels, 165/70/R13 tires, and through a 92 hp (69 kW) 1.5 L (D15Z1) VTEC-E engine. These features on the VX yielded 48/55 mpg (city/hwy) [revised to 2008 EPA rating: 39/49 mpg city/hwy] or 44/51 mpg (city/hwy) [revised to 2008 EPA rating: 36/46 mpg city/hwy] The VX remains a favorite of Hypermilers.

The D15Z1 engine's efficiency was enhanced by placing cam followers at every cam lobe and the use of only two piston rings per cylinder, and the ability to burn an ultra-lean air fuel mixture at and below 2,500 RPM at low load. This was achieved by only opening one valve during the intake stroke, rather than both, placing the multiport fuel injectors very near the intake valves, and by using an ultra sensitive oxygen sensor. The sensor has two O_{2} measurement electrochemical cells, rather than the single cell that at the time was universal. This same model sensor has been adopted by racing teams to monitor the combustion in each cylinder of racing engines during the tuning process, one per cylinder, because of its sensitivity.

The opening of only one intake valve below 2,500 rpm results in much more of the pressure drop between atmospheric pressure, and the inside of the cylinder to be across the valve than would otherwise be the case. This results in an exceptionally turbulent flow, very good mixing of the charge, very high speed flame propagation at ignition, high resistance to pre-ignition (knock), and very low amounts of unburned hydrocarbons, and carbon monoxide, and increased engine torque, and power in both lean burn mode, and at more normal fuel-air mixtures, below 2,500 rpm. As a result of the increased torque and power at low rpm, the engine's torque and power curves are between those of normally-aspirated gasoline and diesel engines. Combined with the decent aerodynamics of the Civic VX, the car could operate at highway speeds in lean burn mode.

One of the few rocks Honda left unturned in search of better fuel economy was increasing the final drive ratio of the VX, usually expressed as the number of engine revolutions per mile in the transmission's top gear. Since the ratio of the VX is identical to the CX, despite the engine's greater power, low end torque, and the car's lower coefficient of drag the use of a higher final drive ratio would have resulted in a drivable car, with even higher fuel economy. The lower than necessary final drive ratio results in a vehicle that is remarkably quick off the line, for one that can get 50 MPG on the highway. A higher ratio could have been accomplished by transmission modifications, such as an overdrive top gear, a dual-range transmission, or simply by using larger-diameter wheels, in conjunction with a wide-ratio transmission, so there would be sufficient torque on the driving wheels in first gear.

In Canada, the VX was rated by Transport Canada fuel consumption estimate: 4.7L/100 km city and 4.3L/100 km hwy. Other added features were an 8,000 rpm tachometer with redline at 6,000 rpm, lightweight 13-inch (330 mm) aluminum alloy wheels, as well as additional front & rear under-body trim additions to improve aerodynamic flow. The VX was also equipped with an aluminum alternator bracket, an aluminum front driver's side engine mount, and a lightweight crank pulley. In addition, the instrument cluster of the CX and VX featured a shift indicator light that would notify the driver when to shift upward in order to achieve optimum fuel economy. The CX and VX models have been lauded as gasoline-powered cars which rival the fuel economy of today's hybrids and diesels. In the March 2010 issue of Car & Driver, it mentions its long-term test car, a 2009 VW TDI Jetta with 6-speed dual-clutch auto transmission, got worse fuel mileage (38 mpg) than their 1992 Honda Civic VX test car (which got 41 mpg) and 2000 Honda Insight hybrid (48 mpg).

DX: The standard model was the more powerful DX, with a 102 hp (76 kW) 1.5 L D15B7 engine, manual passenger side mirror (after 1992), tilt steering, intermittent wipers, side mouldings, rear wiper/washer, and rear cargo shelf as standard equipment. Despite the higher horsepower powerplant, the DX returns real-world mileage of 38 city / 45 hwy.

Si: The Si model replaced rear drum brakes with discs, added a power moonroof with tilt, cruise control, a dashboard clock, a 9,000 rpm tachometer with a 7,200 rpm redline, plastic wheel covers on 14-inch wheels, power side mirrors (body coloured, beginning in 1993), body-coloured door handles, and a 125 hp (93 kW) 1.6 L 16-valve single-overhead cam D16Z6 VTEC 4-cylinder engine with a 5-speed manual transmission. It enabled the car to hit 0–60 mph (97 km/h) in 7.5 seconds and a quarter-mile time of 16.3 seconds at 86 mph (138 km/h). VTEC activated on the intake side and not the exhaust side, which was the result of the spark plug blocking the area where the cam follower would be. In 1994, rear speakers and optional ABS were added.

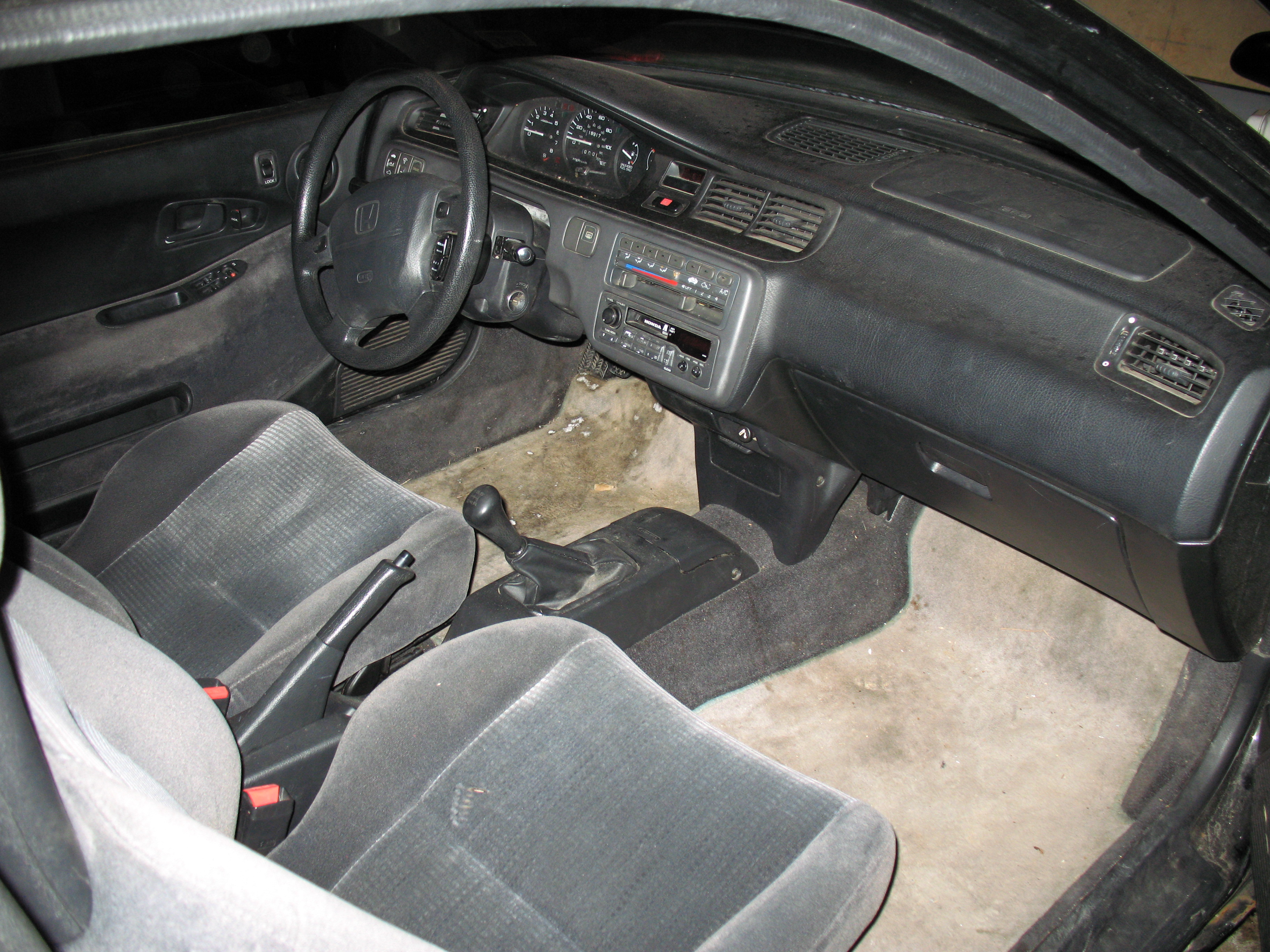
1994 Civic coupé interior

In other markets (Australia, Japan, Latin America) the Si received the 1.6 D16A8/9 DOHC non-VTEC engine, with 130 PS (96 kW; 128 hp). At this time, however, the Si was not the most powerful variant of the Civic sold elsewhere: In Europe, Honda also offered the Civic VTi, which featured a 160 PS (118 kW; 160 hp) B16A2 engine, and the JDM SiR, SiR-II, and SiR-S carried an even more powerful B16A engine, which made 170 PS (125 kW; 168 hp). Japan also received a VTi model with a 1.5 litre engine similar to the D16Z6, with 130 PS (96 kW; 128 hp).

In European markets the trims available were the DX (EG3/1.3 L; 75 PS Engine code:D13B2), LSi (EG4/1.5 L 90 PS Engine code:D15B2), VEi (EG4/1.5 L SOHC VTEC-E 92 PS Engine code:D15Z1), ESi (EG5/1.6 L SOHC VTEC 125 PS Engine code:D16Z6), and VTi (EG6/1.6 L DOHC VTEC 160 PS Engine code:B16A2)

	USDM	CDM	Engine	Transmission	Features
EH2	CX	CX	USA: 70 hp (52 kW) 1.5L D15B8 Canada: 102 hp (76 kW) 1.5 L D15B7	Manual: S20 A000 Automatic (Canada only): S24A	Power brakes CDM only: Automatic Transmission (AT) option Power Steering (with AT) Intermittent wipers Rear wiper/washer (1995 only)
EH2	VX	VX	92 hp (69 kW) 1.5 L D15Z1 VTEC-E	Manual: S20 A000	8,000 rpm tachometer with 6,000 rpm redline; 13 in (330 mm) alloy wheels; Front chin spoiler/lip & rear under-body trim; Aluminum alternator bracket; Aluminum front driver's side engine mount; Lightweight crank pulley
EH2	DX	DX	102 hp (76 kW) 1.5 L D15B7	Manual: S20 A000 Automatic: S24A	Passenger side mirror (beginning 1993); Tilt steering; No tachometer (Automatic Transmission only); Intermittent wipers; Side moldings; Rear wiper/washer; Rear cargo shelf; Power steering
EH3	Si	Si (1992-93 only)	125 hp (93 kW) 1.6 L D16Z6 VTEC	Manual: S20 B000	Rear disc brakes; Power moonroof with tilt; Cruise control; Clock; 9,000 rpm tachometer with 7,200 rpm redline; Plastic wheelcovers on 14-inch wheels; Power side mirrors (body coloured, beginning 1993); Body-coloured door handles; Interior door map pockets; Three sun visors (small middle one above mirror); Unique interior fabric, White stripes (92-93) and checked pattern (94-95)

=== Sedan ===
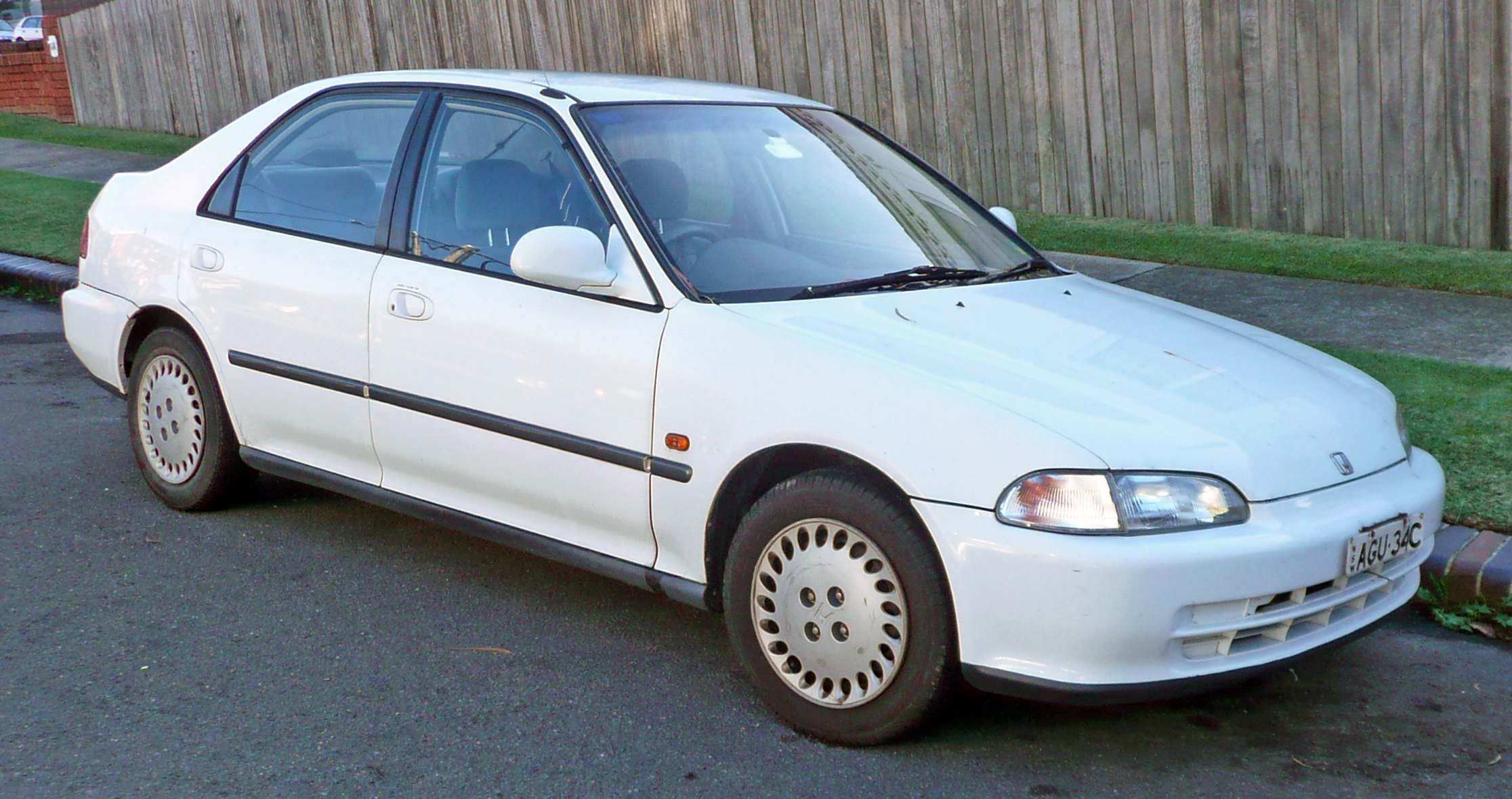
1993-1995 Civic sedan

Trims available in the USDM sedan body style were the DX, LX (EG8) and EX (EH9), while the CDM models were branded slightly differently as the LX, LX "Special Edition" (1994–95), EX (EG8) and the EX-V (1992–93) (EH9). In Japan, the standard four-door Civic sedan was called Civic Ferio and sold at Honda Primo dealerships, while a more upscale version was called the Honda Domani and sold at Honda Clio dealers. In Japan, the Ferio name was used from 1992 until 2006 on all sedans, regardless of trim packages installed.

The five-door wagon was not updated for this generation platform, and continued to use the previous generation internationally until February 21, 1996, when it was replaced by the Honda Orthia and Honda Partner which were only available in Japan.

	USDM	CDM	Engine	Transmission	Features
EG8	DX	LX	102 hp (76 kW) 1.5 L D15B7	Manual: S20 A000 Automatic: S24A	Power brakes; Power steering
EG8		LX "Special Edition" (1994-95 only)	102 hp (76 kW) 1.5 L D15B7	Manual: S20 A000 Automatic: S24A	AM/FM cassette player with 4-speaker sound system; Wheelcovers; Center armrest console; Clock; Power steering; Air conditioning
EG8	LX	EX	102 hp (76 kW) 1.5 L D15B7	Manual: S20 A000 Automatic: S24A	AM/FM cassette player with 4-speaker sound system (CDM beginning 1993, USDM beginning 1994); Cruise control; Center armrest console; Clock; 9,000 RPM tachometer with 6,000 RPM redline; Power steering; Power windows, locks, and mirrors; Anti-Lock Braking System (ABS) (USDM option, only 1994-95); 4-Wheel Disc Brakes (with ABS option); Cargo area light; Front stabilizer bar; Wheelcovers; / Wheels / Tires; 1992–93 / 13-inch (330 mm) / 175/70; 1994–95 / 14-inch (360 mm) / 175/65
EH9	EX	EX-V (1992-93 only)	125 hp (93 kW) 1.6 L D16Z6 VTEC	Manual: S20 B000 Automatic: S24A	9,000 RPM tachometer with 7,200 RPM redline: Power tilt/slide moon roof; Body-coloured mirrors (beginning 1993); Rear stabilizer bar; AM/FM cassette player (CDM only: with 2-speaker sound system, USDM and CDM: with 4-speaker system beginning 1993); Air Conditioning

== Markets ==
=== North America ===
All DX and LX models used the D15B7, a 1.5-liter 16-valve SOHC 4-cylinder engine rated at 102 bhp (76 kW; 103 PS) and 98 ft⋅lbf (133 N⋅m) of torque. The USDM CX models had the D15B8 which is a 1.5-liter 8-valve 4-cylinder engine rated at 70 bhp (52 kW; 71 PS) while the CDM models came with the D15B7. The VX had the 1.5-liter D15Z1 (VTEC-E 4-cylinder engine) rated at 92 bhp (69 kW; 93 PS). The USDM EX / CDM EX-V, and the Si had the 1.6-liter 16-valve D16Z6 SOHC VTEC 4-cylinder engine (125 hp (93 kW)).

USDM Curb Weights

	CX Hatch	VX Hatch	Si Hatch	DX Hatch	
	Manual	Manual	Manual	Auto	Manual
1992–1993	2,094	2,094	2,326	2,275	2,178
1994–1995	2,108	2,094	2,390	2,264	2,178

	DX Sedan		LX Sedan		EX Sedan		DX Coupe		EX Coupe	
	Auto	Manual	Auto	Manual	Auto	Manual	Auto	Manual	Auto	Manual
1992–1993	2,343	2,274	2,388	2,319	2,524	2,480	2,317	2,224	2,445	2,390
1994–1995	2,392	2,313	2,456	2,403	2,575	2,522	2,326	2,231	2,575	2,520

All weights listed in this table are in lbs.

=== Japan ===
The model trims included the ML with a D15B single carb (hatchback EG3, sedan EG7), MX with a D15B dual carb, ETi with a fuel-injected D15B VTEC-E, VTi with a fuel-injected D15B VTEC (130 PS SOHC VTEC) (hatchback EG4s, sedan EG8s), RTi with a ZC SOHC dual carb, RTSi with a fuel-injected ZC DOHC (sedan EH1s with 4WD), Coupe (coupe EJ1) and EXi (AT-only sedan EJ3) with a fuel-injected D16B VTEC, and SiR with a fuel-injected B16A DOHC VTEC (170 PS) (hatchback EG6, sedan EG9). The D16B VTEC in the Coupe and EXi had the same power rating as the D15B VTEC in the VTi (128hp-130ps), but the torque is a bit higher. The D15B shared the same head as the D16Z6 found in other markets but featured a unique block, crank, and rods. The engine shared the 1.5 L displacement of the other D15 blocks, but the rods were the same length as the D16's (137mm) and had a better rod to stroke ratio (1.63) than the normal D15's ratio of 1.59. Despite this, the crank and bearing sizes were not the same. The sedan/saloon in Japan was called the Civic "Ferio".

=== Europe ===
The model trims included the DX with a D13B2 (hatchback EG3), the LSi with a D15B2 (hatchback EG4, sedan EG8) or D15B7 (coupé EJ2), the VEi with a D15Z1 VTEC-E (hatchback EG4 and sedan EG8), the ESi with a 1.6-litre 16-valve SOHC VTEC D16Z6 4-cylinder engine (coupé EJ1, hatchback EG5, sedan EH9), the RTSi with a D16Z9 VTEC (sedan EH1), and the VTi with a 1.6-litre 16-valve DOHC VTEC B16A2 4-cylinder engine (hatchback EG6, sedan EG9).

=== Philippines ===
The model trims included the DX with a 1.3-litre 12-valve carbureted SOHC PH12 (hatchback SR3/SY5 and sedan SR4/SY6), the LX with a 1.5-litre 16-valve carbureted SOHC PH15 (sedan SR4/SY6) and power steering, and the ESi with a 1.6-litre 16-valve fuel-injected SOHC PH16 (sedan SR4/SY6) and all power amenities. All grades were equipped with regular front disc brakes and rear drum brakes and powered with the non-VTEC 4-cylinder engines. Paired with 5-speed manual transmissions, while the ESi grade came with 4-speed automatic transmission. The revised interiors were came out between June 1994 and June 1995 for LX and ESi grades. The ESi grade has major updates while the LX grade has minimal.

=== Indonesia ===
In Indonesia, the fifth-generation Civic had two body styles, sedan (SR4, nicknamed "Genio") and 3-door hatchback (SR3, "Estilo"). Both had the same D16 SOHC 4-cylinder engine that produced 120-130 HP and were available with a 5-speed manual or 4-speed automatic transmissions.

=== Pakistan ===
The fifth-generation Civic was launched and manufactured beginning in May 1994 in Pakistan and was only produced as a sedan. It was equipped with a 1.5-liter 16-valve carbureted engine with a 5-speed manual transmission. The fifth-generation Civic was the first to be manufactured in Pakistan and was produced until December 1995. The total number of fifth-generation Civics manufactured in Pakistan was 6,480 units. The first example to come off the production line is on display at the Honda Heritage Center in Lahore.

=== Middle East ===
In the Middle East, the EX had the D16Z9 (sedan EH5) and the VTi (hatchback & coupé, EJ2) had the B16A2/3 engine.
