= Honda CR-X del Sol =

Targa-top car by Honda (1992–1998)

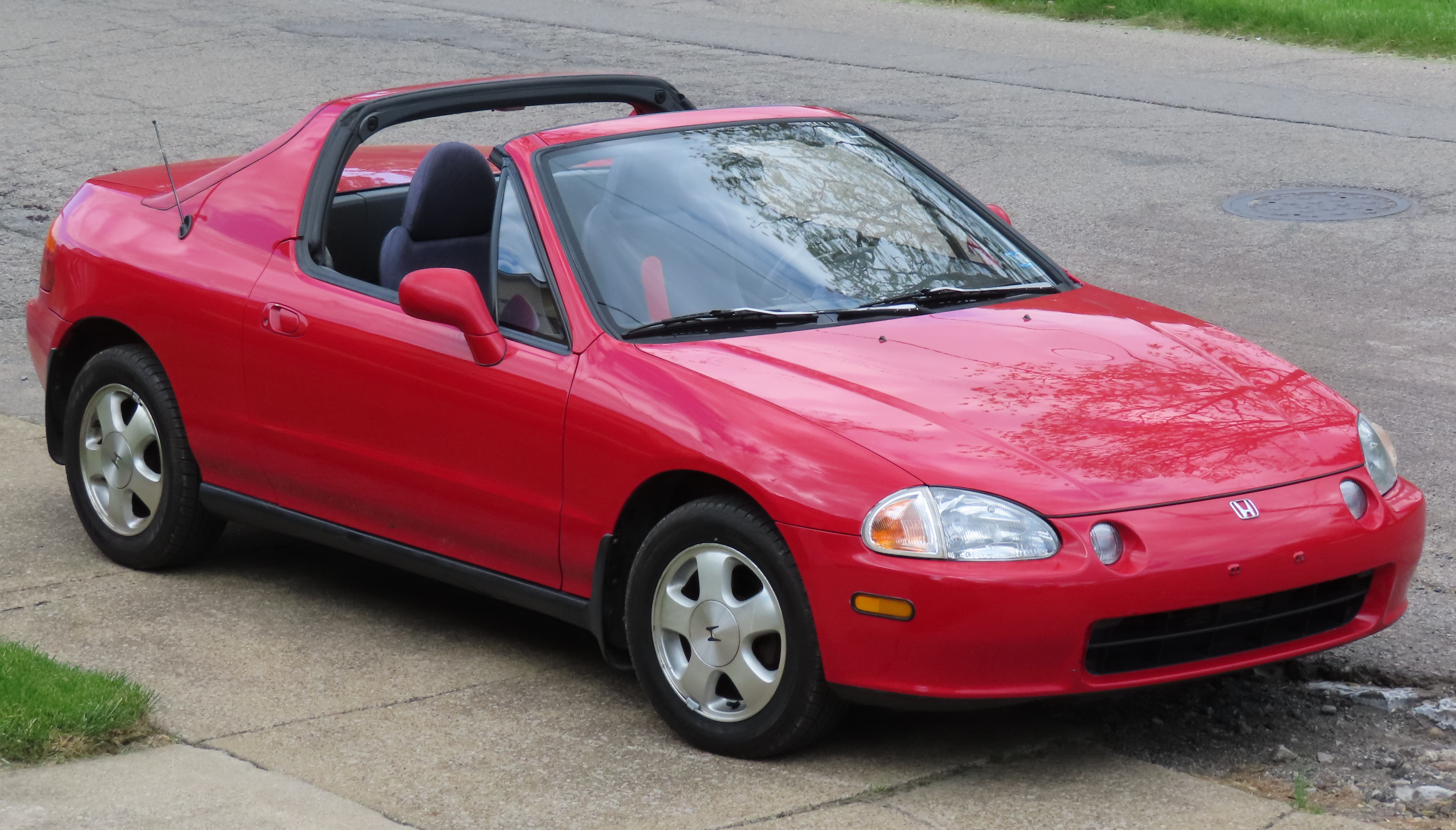
- 1994 Honda Civic del Sol Si

Overview
- Manufacturer: Honda
- Also called: Honda Civic del Sol; Honda del Sol; Honda CRX
- Production: 1992–1998
- Model years: 1993–1998
- Assembly: Japan: Suzuka, Mie (Suzuka Plant)
- Designer: Yoshikazu Kigoshi (1989)

Body and chassis
- Class: Sport compact
- Body style: 2-door roadster
- Layout: Front-engine, front-wheel-drive
- Chassis: EG1, EG2, EH6
- Related: Honda Civic; Acura/Honda Integra

Powertrain
- Engine: 1.5 L D15B7 I4; 1.5 L D15B VTEC I4; 1.6 L D16Z6/D16Y8 I4; 1.6 L B16A3/B16A2 I4
- Transmission: 4-speed automatic 5-speed manual

Dimensions
- Wheelbase: 2,370 mm (93.3 in)
- Length: 4,005 mm (157.7 in)
- Width: 1,695 mm (66.7 in)
- Height: 1,255 mm (49.4 in)
- Curb weight: 2,295–2,535 lb (1,041–1,150 kg)

Chronology
- Predecessor: Honda CR-X

The Honda CR-X del Sol (marketed in other markets as the Honda Civic del Sol, Honda del Sol and the Honda CRX) is a two-seater targa-top car manufactured by Honda from 1992 until 1998. The del Sol uses a front-engine layout based on the fifth-generation Civic and was the successor to the Honda CR-X.

The Spanish name del Sol translates to of the sun, and refers to the car's opening roof. The del Sol featured a removable aluminum hardtop that stowed onto a hinged frame in the trunk and a motorized drop-down rear window. Manual and automatic "TransTop" roofs were available in select markets. It is the first open-air Honda sold in the United States.

Production and sales ended with the 1997 model in North America and 1998 elsewhere.

== Japanese and European markets ==
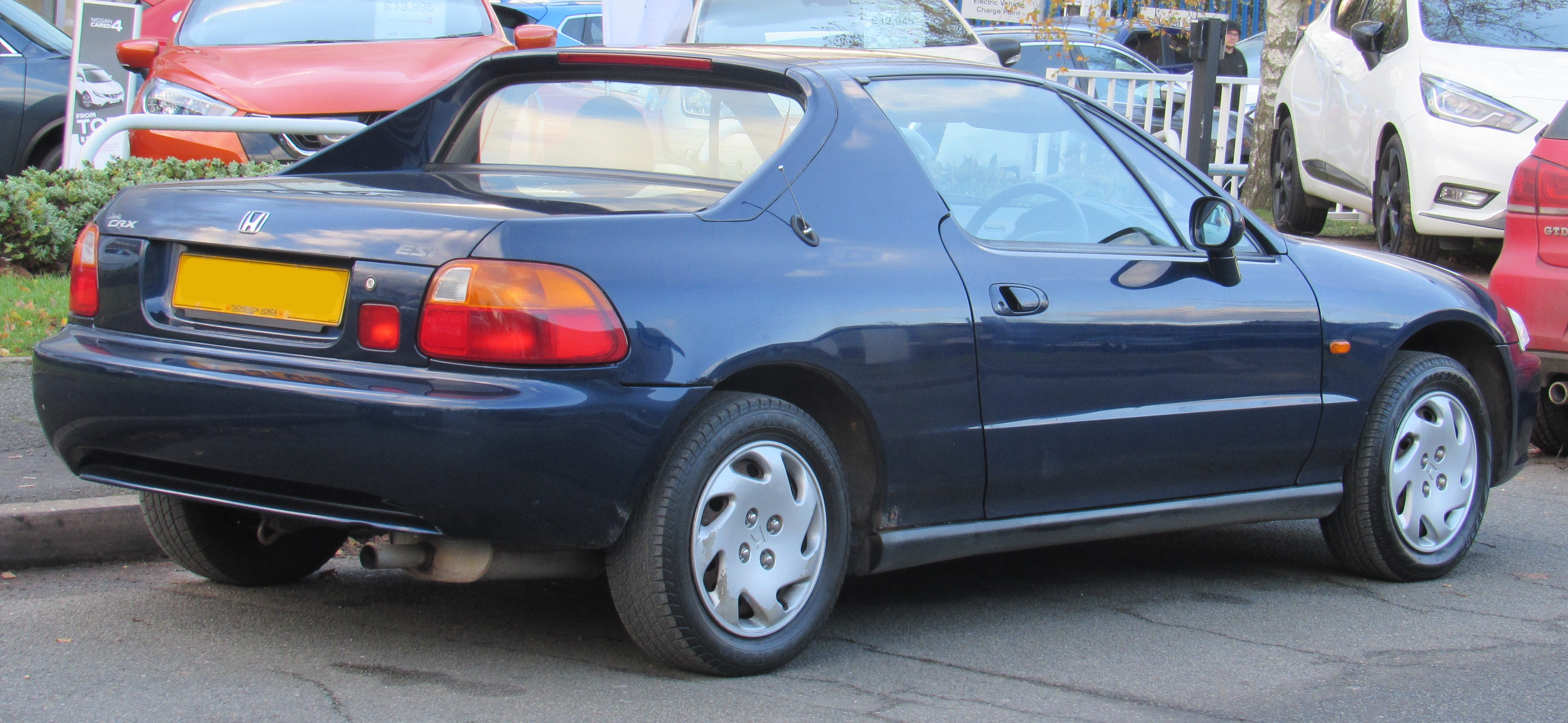
Honda CR-X del Sol ESi Rear

The CR-X del Sol was first introduced to Japan and Europe in 1992 for the 1993 model year. The base model (called the VXi in Japan) came equipped with 13-inch steel wheels, available only at Honda Verno Japanese dealerships. The Japanese VXi/VGi versions came with a Honda D15B-VTEC 4-cylinder engine, an entry-level SOHC VTEC engine that produced 130 PS (96 kW; 128 hp).

The "Si" (called the "ESi" in Europe) model came standard with a 1.6-liter D16Z6 SOHC VTEC 16-valve 4-cylinder engine. The Si also came with 14-inch alloy wheels, optional body-color-matched paint on Samba Green models, power side mirrors, cruise control, rear disc brakes, wider tires, and additional front & rear anti-sway bars.

The SiR models in Japan are powered by a 170 PS (125 kW; 168 hp) 1.6-liter DOHC VTEC (B16A) 4-cylinder engine available with an optional limited-slip differential.

A premium model, VTi, was also available in Europe, which came equipped with the same B16A 1.6-liter DOHC VTEC 4-cylinder engine available in the North American del Sol VTEC.

Depending on model and market, the options included a rear spoiler, custom floor mats, an automatic transmission, power steering, heated mirrors, front fog lights, traction control system (JDM only), limited-slip differential (JDM only), and air conditioning.

== North American market ==
For the North American market, the car was marketed as a Civic del Sol upon its release for the 1993 model year.

During its initial year, trim levels were limited to the S and Si models powered by SOHC Honda D-series four-cylinder engines. In 1994, the Civic del Sol VTEC model was added which included the B16A3 1.6-liter 16-valve DOHC VTEC engine producing 160 hp (119 kW; 162 PS), stiffer suspension, as well as larger front disc brakes and larger 14-inch tires. The S and Si models were available with either a 5-speed manual transmission or a 4-speed automatic while the del Sol VTEC model was only available with a 5-speed manual transmission.

In 1994, dual air bags became standard. Beginning in 1995, the car was marketed as the Honda del Sol (Civic being removed from the name). In 1996, the del Sol received a minor interior and exterior styling refresh and the S model got a 1.6-liter SOHC 4-cylinder engine replacing the 1.5-liter engine that came in the 93-95 models. 1997 was the final year of production for the del Sol in North America.

== Colors ==
The 1993-1994 U.S. market Del Sol came in five colors, namely Captiva blue pearl (color code B62P), frost white (code NH538), Granada black pearl (code NH503P), Milano red (code R81), and Samba green pearl (code GY15P). For 1995, Honda replaced Captiva blue pearl and Samba green pearl with isle green pearl (code G71P) and paradise blue-green pearl (code BG33P), and made frost white available on the Si. For 1996–1997, Honda removed the paradise blue-green pearl color, replaced isle green pearl with Cypress green pearl (code G82P), and added vogue silver metallic (NH583M).

	1993		1994			1995			1996			1997		
Color name	S	Si	S	Si	VTEC	S	Si	VTEC	S	Si	VTEC	S	Si	VTEC
Captiva blue pearl (B62P)	X	X	X	X										
Samba green pearl (GY15P)		X		X										
Granada black pearl (NH503P)	X	X	X	X	X	X	X	X	X	X	X	X	X	X
Frost white (NH538)	X		X			X	X		X	X		X	X	
Milano red (R81)	X	X	X	X	X	X	X	X	X	X	X	X	X	X
Isle green pearl (G71P)								X						
Paradise blue-green pearl (BG33P)						X	X							
Cypress green pearl (G82P)										X	X		X	X
Vogue silver metallic (NH583M)									X			X		

== TransTop ==
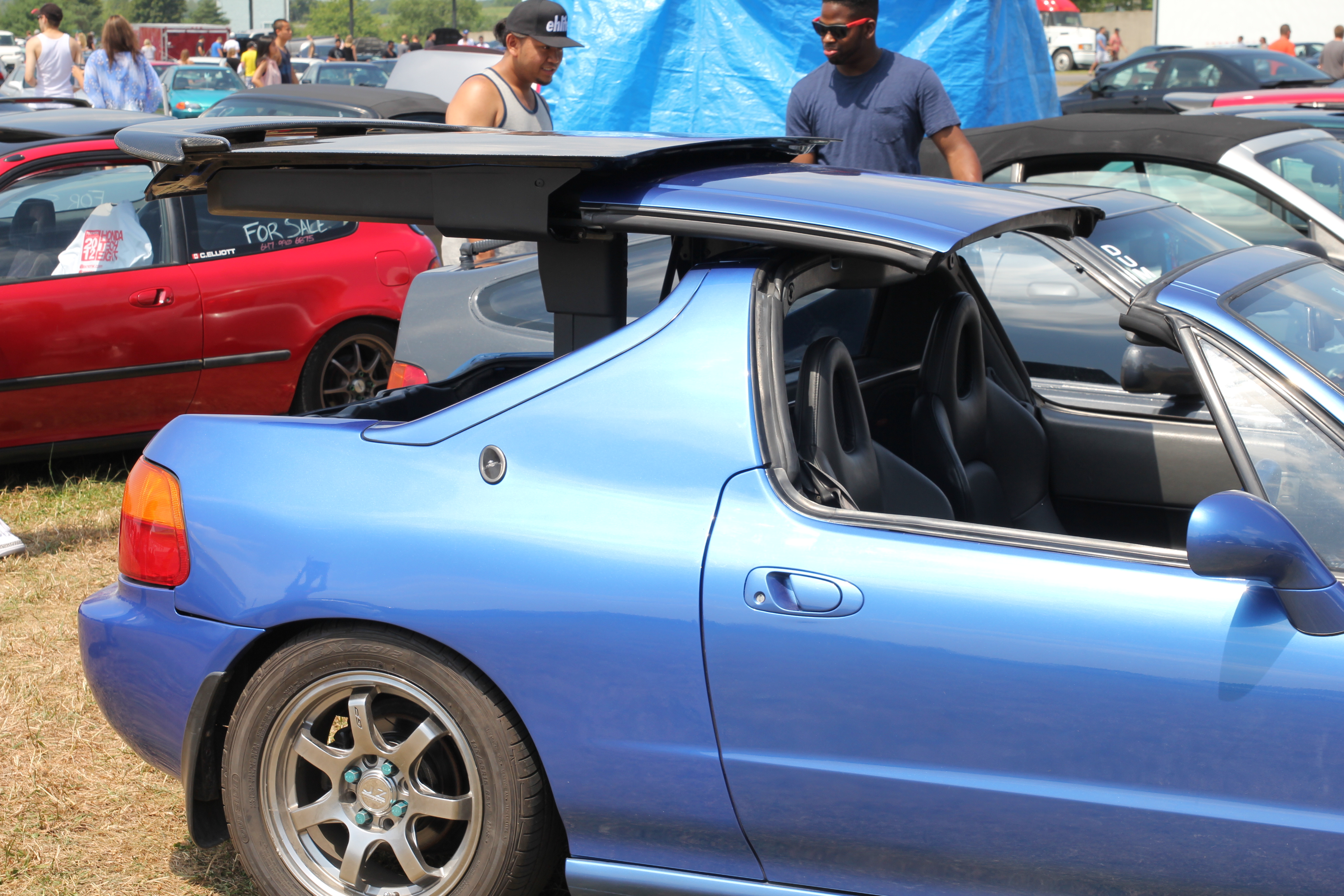
Honda CR-X del Sol TransTop targa roof

Most del Sols came equipped with a 24 lb (11 kg) aluminium roof that could be manually removed and stowed onto a hinged frame in the trunk where it took up 2.2 cubic feet (62 L) of trunk space. An option available in Japan and Europe was the TransTop, an electric 4-motor mechanism which retracted the targa top into the trunk via a push of a button. The roof is operated by flicking two catches above the windows, then holding down a button. The trunk lid raises vertically about twenty inches and two arms extend into the targa top. After locking the lid to the arms, the arms pull the targa into the trunk lid, which lowers back down with the roof inside the trunk cavity. The open process is reversed for the closure and return of the targa top.

== Model updates ==
Autumn 1992 (1993 model year):

- CR-X del Sol launched in Japan with two trim levels – VXi and SiR (Japan)
- Civic del Sol launched in USA with two trim levels – S and Si (U.S.)
- CR-X del Sol launched in Europe with two trim levels – ESi and VTi (Europe)

U.S. export market changes for 1994:

- Added VTEC trim level, with 1.6-litre (98 cu in) B16A3 DOHC VTEC engine 160 hp (120 kW) and 118 lb⋅ft (160 N⋅m) of torque (U.S.), 9,000 rpm tachometer, and improved suspension (U.S.)
- S trim level receives front sway bar
- Dual SRS airbags standard (U.S.)

Changes for 1995:

- Civic tag dropped from US name; model now called del Sol (U.S.)
- VXi trim was only available in Japan as a 1.5-litre (92 cu in) SOHC VTEC. VGi, which was the Japanese version of the European ESi 1.6-litre (98 cu in) SOHC VTEC, replaced the VXi. (Japan)
- Redesigned targa top seals to help prevent leakage (U.S.)
- Added anti-lock brakes on VTEC trim, 2,522 lb (1,144 kg) base weight now (U.S.)
- Heater vents in center console can now be open or closed
- Added remote trunk release (U.S.)
- Low fuel light (U.S.)
- New alloy wheel design (U.S.)
- S trim receives redesigned wheel covers (U.S.)
- Si and VTEC trims receive redesigned alloy wheels

Changes for 1996 (mid-model refresh):

- Elimination of front auxiliary headlamps (U.S.)
- Small airdam / rear deck aesthetic treatment (U.S.)
- New front bumper and air dam (U.S.)
- Length increase to 157.7 in (4,010 mm)(U.S.)
- The base del Sol S receives the 1.6-litre (98 cu in) SOHC D16Y7 engine with 106 hp (79 kW), a 4-horsepower (3.0 kW) increase over previous years' D15B 1.5-liter. (U.S.)
- The del Sol Si receives the 1.6-litre (98 cu in) 127 hp (95 kW) SOHC VTEC D16Y8 engine, as well as the suspension, larger front and rear stabilizer bars, and steering of the 160 hp (120 kW) VTEC trim. (U.S.)
- The del Sol VTEC receives the 1.6-litre (98 cu in) 160 hp (120 kW) DOHC VTEC B16A2 engine (U.S.)
- OBD-II Emission control system implemented
- New seat materials (U.S.)
- New carpeting material (U.S.)

Change for 1997:

- Production ends (U.S., Canada)

End of production in 1998:

- Production ends (Japan, Europe)

== Sales ==
Number of del Sols sold in the United States by calendar year:

Year	Quantity
1993	25,748
1994	21,075
1995	14,021
1996	8,489
1997	5,603

Due to a production delay, some of the 1996 U.S. Domestic Market sales were leftover 1995 model year cars.

== VIN decoder ==
VIN decoder for U.S. domestic market del Sol:

Example     Description
 Vin #
-------    --------------------------------
   J   ]─ Country of manufacture: J= Japan
   H   ]─ Make: H= Honda Motor Company
   M   ]─ Passenger car
   E   ┐ 	   EG1 = D15B7 (93-95 S)
   G   ├─ Engine:  EG2 = B16A3 (94-95 VTEC), B16A2 (96-97 VTEC)
   1   ┘	   EH6 = D16Z6 (93-95 Si), D16Y7 (96-97 S), D16Y8 (96-97 Si) 
   1   ]─ Body/Transmission: 1= 2-door manual 5-speed   2= 2-door automatic
   4   ]─ Vehicle series: 4= S, 6= Si, 7 or 9= VTEC
   3   ]─ Check digit
   S   ]─ Model year: P= 1993, R= 1994, S= 1995, T= 1996, V= 1997
   S   ]─ Assembly plant: S= Suzuka
   0   ┐
   0   │
   1   ├── Serial number, sequentially numbered via production output
   2   │
   3   |
   4   ┘
