= Honda B engine =

Former Japanese automobile engines

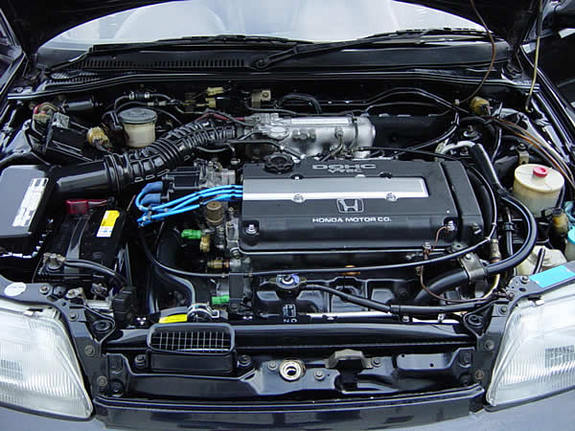

Overview
- Manufacturer: Honda
- Production: 1988–2001

Layout
- Configuration: Naturally aspirated inline-4
- Displacement: 1.6–2.0 L (1,595–1,973 cc; 97.3–120.4 cu in)
- Cylinder bore: 81 mm (3.19 in); 84 mm (3.31 in)
- Piston stroke: 77.4 mm (3.05 in); 81.4 mm (3.20 in); 87.2 mm (3.43 in); 89 mm (3.5 in)
- Valvetrain: DOHC, VTEC in some models
- Compression ratio: 8.8:1–11.1:1

RPM range
- Max. engine speed: 6,500–8,400 rpm

Combustion
- Fuel system: Programmed fuel injection
- Fuel type: Gasoline
- Cooling system: Water-cooled

Output
- Power output: 126–197 hp (94–147 kW; 128–200 PS)
- Torque output: 150–190 N⋅m (111–140 lb⋅ft)

Chronology
- Successor: Honda K engine

The B-series are a family of inline four-cylinder DOHC automotive engines introduced by Honda in 1988. Sold concurrently with the D-series which were primarily SOHC engines designed for more economical applications, the B-series were a performance option featuring dual overhead cams along with the first application of Honda's VTEC (Variable Valve Timing and Lift Electronic Control) system in certain models, high-pressure die cast aluminum block, cast-in quadruple-Siamese iron liners.

To identify a Honda B-series engine, the letter B is normally followed by two numbers to designate the displacement of the engine, another letter, and in US-spec engines, another number. The Japanese spec-engines are normally designated with a four character alphanumeric designation. The B-series, the B20B variant in particular, is not to be confused with the earlier Honda B20A engine introduced in 1985 and primarily available in the Prelude and Accord-derived vehicles from 1985 to 1991. While sharing some design elements and both being multivalve Honda four-cylinders, the B-series and B20A differ substantially in architecture, enough to be considered distinct engine families.

They were made in 1.6 L (1,595 cc), 1.7 L (1,678 cc), 1.8 L (1,797 cc), 1.8 L (1,834 cc), and 2.0 L (1,973 cc) variants, with and without VTEC. Later models have minor upgrades including modifications to the intake valves and ports and piston tops, along with individual cylinder oil injectors (B18C models). They produce between 126 hp (94 kW; 128 PS) and 197 hp (147 kW; 200 PS), with some models capable of a redline of 8400 rpm.

Although it has many variations, the basic design differs very little among the B-Series. There are actually two short blocks which are used for the entire series. The distinction between them was the cylinder block deck height. The one used for B16 and B17 engines (except for B16B) has a deck height of 203.9 mm (8.03 in) while the short block used for B16B, B18 and B20 engines has a deck height of 212 mm (8.3 in).

The Honda B16 has appeared in six different forms over the years. The Honda B-series was replaced by the K-series in Civic, Integra, Odyssey, and CR-V applications.

== B16 ==
=== B16A (First generation) ===
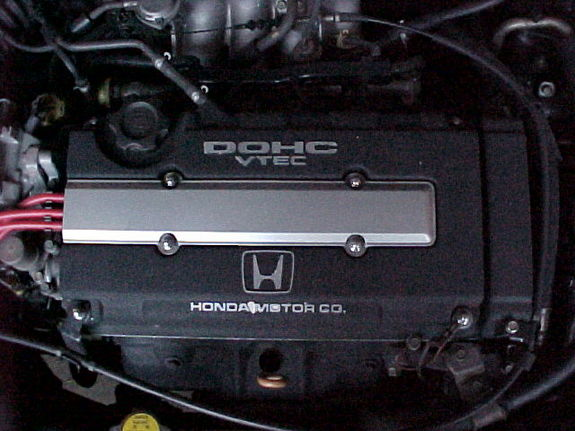
First generation of the B16A engine

The first VTEC engine.

- B16A found in:
  - 1989-1993 Honda Integra XSi
  - 1989-1991 Honda CRX SiR (EF8)
  - 1989-1991 Honda Civic SiR (EF9)
- Displacement: 1.6 L (1,595 cc; 97.3 cu in)
- Compression: 10.2:1
- Bore x Stroke: 81 mm × 77.4 mm (3.19 in × 3.05 in)
- Rod Length: 134 mm (5.3 in)
- Rod/stroke ratio: 1.745
- Power: 158 hp (118 kW; 160 PS) at 7600 rpm & 150 N⋅m (111 lb⋅ft) at 7000 rpm
- RPM:
  - VTEC engagement: 4500 rpm
  - Redline: 8000 rpm
  - Rev Limit: 8200 rpm
- Transmission: S1/J1/YS1 (4.4 final drive, cable clutch, optional LSD for YS1), Y1 (4.266 final drive, cable clutch, optional LSD)
- ECU code: P-fk1 (DA6/DA8/EF8), PW0 (EF8/EF9/DA6), PR3 (EF8/EF9) OBD0

=== B16A (Second generation) ===
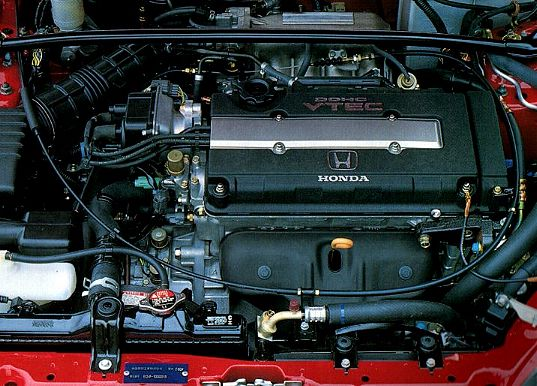
B16A engine

- Found in:
  - 1992–1993 Honda Integra "XSi" (DA6, DA8)
  - 1992–1994 Honda Civic SiR/SiRII (EG6)
  - 1992–1993 Honda Civic Ferio SiR (EG9)
  - 1992–1995 Honda CR-X del Sol SiR (EG2)
  - 1996–1998 Honda Civic SiR/SiRII (EK4)
  - 1996–2000 Honda Civic Ferio SiR (EK4)
- Displacement: 1.6 L (1,595 cc; 97.3 cu in)
- Compression: 10.4:1
- Bore x Stroke: 81 mm × 77.4 mm (3.19 in × 3.05 in)
- Rod Length: 134 mm (5.3 in)
- Rod/stroke ratio: 1.745
- Power: MT: 172 PS (127 kW; 170 hp) at 7400 rpm & 157 N⋅m (116 lb⋅ft) at 7000 rpm
- RPM:
  - VTEC engagement: 5500 rpm
  - Redline: 8200 rpm
  - Rev Limit: 8200 rpm
- Transmission: YS1/S4C/Y21/S21/ S24A (4.4 final drive, optional LSD)
- ECU code: P30 (EG2/EG6/EG8/EG9), PR3 (DA6)
- OBD1 P2T (EK4) OBD2

=== B16B (Type R) ===
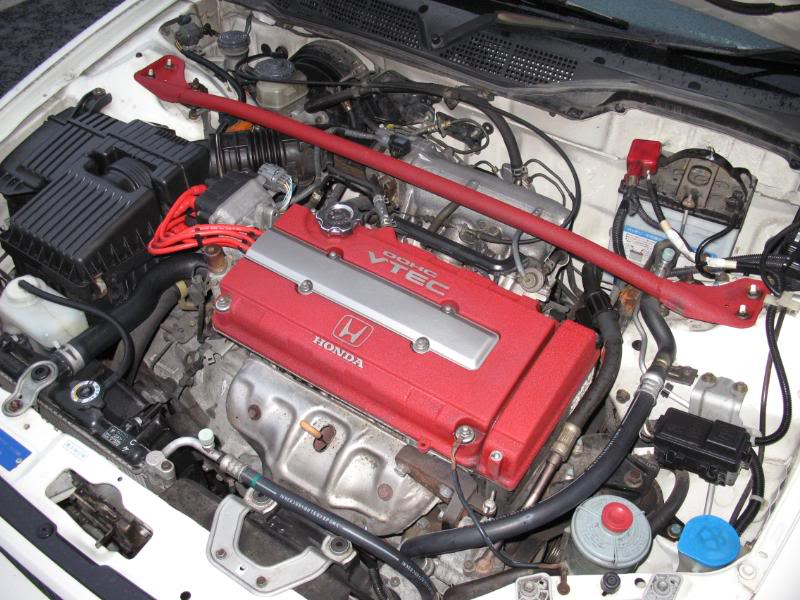
B16B engine

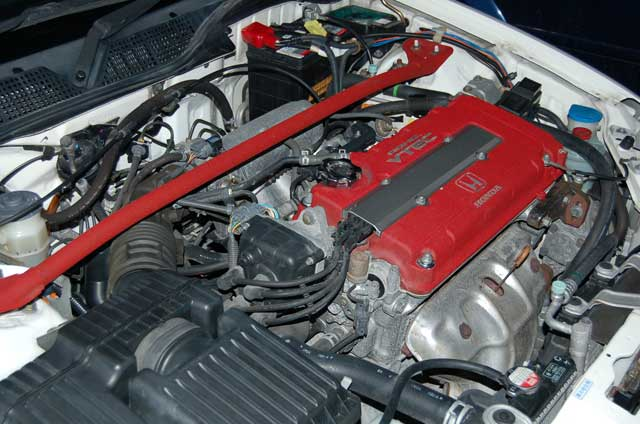
B16B in a Honda Civic Type R

- Found in:
  - 1997–2000 Civic Type R
- Displacement: 1.6 L (1,595 cc; 97.3 cu in)
- Compression ratio: 10.8:1
- Bore x stroke: 81 mm × 77.4 mm (3.19 in × 3.05 in)
- Rod/Stroke ratio: 1.85:1
- Rod Length: 142.42 mm (5.607 in)
- Power: 185 PS (182 hp; 136 kW) at 8,200 rpm
- Torque: 160 N⋅m (118 lb⋅ft) at 7500 rpm
- RPM:
  - VTEC engagement: 6,100 rpm
  - Redline: 8,400 rpm
  - Rev Limit: 8,600 rpm
- Transmission: S4C With Helical LSD (4.4 final drive, dual-cone synchronizer on second gear)
- ECU code: PCT
- ECU Socket Type: OBD-2A (1996-1998 models) / OBD-2B (1999-2000 models)

Note: This engine uses the same block as the Integra Type R, which is taller than the B16A block, but with a crank the same stroke as the B16A. It uses longer rods to accommodate for this, which is why the Rod/Stroke ratio is higher than a standard B16. It is basically a ‘Destroked B18C Type R engine’

=== B16A1 ===
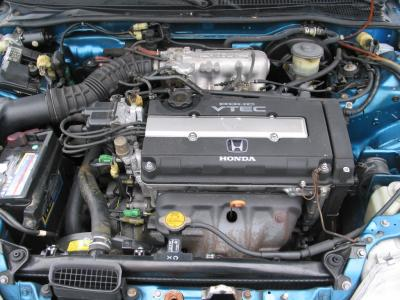
B16A1 engine

- VTEC
- Found in:
  - CRX 1.6 DOHC VTEC (EE8) - European market
  - Civic 1.6 DOHC VTEC (EE9) - European market
- Displacement: 1.6 L (1,595 cc; 97.3 cu in)
- Bore×Stroke: 81 mm × 77.4 mm (3.19 in × 3.05 in)
- Compression: at 10.2:1
- Power: 150 PS (110 kW; 148 hp) at 7600 rpm
- Torque: 144 N⋅m (106 lb⋅ft) at 7100 rpm
- RPM:
  - VTEC engagement: 5200 rpm
  - Redline: 8000 rpm
  - Rev Limit: 8200 rpm
- Transmission: Y2
- OBD0
- ECU CODE: PW0

=== B16A2 ===
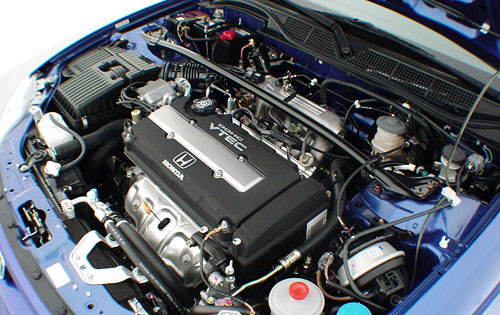
B16A2 engine

- DOHC VTEC
- Found in:
  - 1992-2000 Honda Civic VTi (EU; EG6/EG9 & EK4)
  - 1992-1997 Honda Civic del Sol VTi (EU; EG)
  - 1996-1997 Honda Civic del Sol VTEC (US; EG2)
  - 1996-1998 Honda Civic VTi-R (AU & NZ; EK4)
  - 1999-2000 Honda Civic VTi-R (AU; EM1)
  - 1999-2000 Honda Civic Si (US; EM1)
  - 1996–2000 Honda Civic VTEC – Middle East & South Africa (SO3, SO4)
  - 1999-2000 Honda Civic SiR (Philippines; EK4 Sedan)
  - 1999-2000 Honda Civic SiR (Canada; EM1)
- Displacement: 1.6 L (1,595 cc; 97.3 cu in)
- Bore×Stroke: 81 mm × 77.4 mm (3.19 in × 3.05 in)
- Power: 160 hp (119 kW; 162 PS) at 7600 rpm & 111 lb⋅ft (150 N⋅m) at 6500 rpm
- Compression: 10.2:1
- RPM:
  - VTEC engagement: 5600 rpm
  - Redline: 8000 rpm
  - Rev Limit: 8200 rpm
- Transmission: Y21, S4C

=== B16A3 ===
- DOHC VTEC
- Found in:
  - 1994-1995 Del Sol VTEC US version
- Displacement: 1.6 L (1,595 cc; 97.3 cu in)
- Power: 160 hp (119 kW; 162 PS) at 7600 rpm & 111 lb⋅ft (150 N⋅m) at 6700 rpm
- Compression: 10.2:1
- Bore×Stroke: 81 mm × 77.4 mm (3.19 in × 3.05 in)
- RPM:
  - VTEC engagement: 5600 rpm
  - Redline: 8200 rpm
  - Rev Limit: 8500 rpm
- Transmission: Y21
- OBD1 PR3 is also stamped on head

=== B16A4 ===
- VTEC
- Found in:
  - 1996-2000 Civic Si-RII (JDM version) (EK4)
- Displacement: 1,595 cc (97.3 cu in)
- Compression: 10.4:1
- Power: 130 kW (177 PS; 174 bhp) at 7800 rpm & 111 ft·lbf (150 N·m) at 7300 rpm
- Redline: 8000 rpm
- Transmission: Y21

=== B16A5 ===
- VTEC
- Found in:
  - 1996-2000 Civic Si-RII (JDM version) (EK4)
- Displacement: 1.6 L (1,595 cc; 97.3 cu in)
- Compression: 10.4:1
- Power: 174 hp (130 kW; 176 PS) at 7800 rpm & 150 N⋅m (111 lb⋅ft) at 6300 rpm
- Redline: 8500 rpm
- Transmission: Y21

Note: Only offered on SiRs with automatic transmissions.

=== B16A6 ===
- VTEC
- Found in:
  - 1996–2000 Honda Civic – Middle East & South Africa VTEC (SO3, SO4)
- Displacement: 1.6 L (1,595 cc; 97.3 cu in)
- Compression: 10.2:1
- Power: 158 hp (118 kW; 160 PS) at 7800 rpm & 118 lb⋅ft (160 N⋅m) at 6400 rpm
- Transmission: S4C
- VTEC engagement: 5500 rpm

== B17 ==
=== B17A1 ===
- VTEC
- Found in:
  - 1992–1993 Integra GS-R (North American market VTEC Model VIN DB2)
    - Displacement: 1.7 L (1,678 cc; 102.4 cu in)
    - Bore x Stroke: 81 mm × 81.4 mm (3.19 in × 3.20 in)
    - Rod/Stroke Ratio: 1.63
    - Rod Length: 132.28 mm (5.208 in)
    - Compression: 9.7:1
    - VTEC engagement: 5750 rpm
    - Power: 160 bhp (119 kW; 162 PS) at 7600 rpm & 117 lb⋅ft (159 N⋅m) at 7000 rpm
    - Redline: 8000 rpm
    - Fuel Cutoff: 8250 rpm
    - First DOHC VTEC B series to be marketed in North America as export only. Not available in Japan.
    - Came equipped with the YS1 cable transmission, which was different from other cable B-series YS1 transmissions as it has a different input shaft and a shorter final drive.

== B18 ==
=== B18A1 ===
- Non-VTEC
- Found in:
  - 1990–1991 Acura Integra "RS/LS/LS Special Edition/GS" (US; DA9 Liftback/Hatchback, DB1 Sedan)
    - OBD0
    - Displacement: 1.8 L (1,834 cc; 111.9 cu in)
    - Compression: 9.2:1
    - Bore x Stroke: 81 mm × 89 mm (3.19 in × 3.50 in)
    - Rod Length: 137.01 mm (5.394 in)
    - Rod/Stroke Ratio: 1.54
    - Redline: 6500 rpm
    - Rev Limit: 7200 rpm
    - Programmed fuel injection
    - Power: 130 bhp (97 kW; 132 PS) at 6000 rpm & 121 lb⋅ft (164 N⋅m) at 5000 rpm
    - Transmission: S1, A1, cable.
- Found in:
  - 1992-1993 Acura Integra "GS/LS/LS Special Edition/RS" (US; DA9 Liftback/Hatchback, DB1 Sedan)
    - OBD1 PR4 ECU
    - Displacement: 1.8 L (1,834 cc; 111.9 cu in)
    - Compression: 9.2:1
    - Bore x Stroke: 81 mm × 89 mm (3.19 in × 3.50 in)
    - Rod Length: 137.01 mm (5.394 in)
    - Rod/Stroke Ratio: 1.54
    - Redline: 6700 rpm
    - Rev Limit: 7200 rpm
    - Programmed fuel injection
    - Power: 140 bhp (104 kW; 142 PS) at 6300 rpm & 126 lb⋅ft (171 N⋅m) at 5000 rpm
    - Transmission: YS1, cable. Larger input shaft than 90–91. Uses same clutch as 94+ B series hydro.

=== B18A2 ===
- Non-VTEC
- Found in:
  - 1992-1993 Honda Integra LS DB1 Sedan (sold in other regions, no catalytic converter)
    - OBD0 PR4 ECU
    - Displacement: 1.8 L (1,834 cc; 111.9 cu in)
    - Compression: 9.2:1
    - Bore x Stroke: 81 mm × 89 mm (3.19 in × 3.50 in)
    - Rod Length: 137.01 mm (5.394 in)
    - Rod/Stroke Ratio: 1.54
    - Redline: 6500 rpm
    - Rev Limit: 6700 rpm
    - Programmed fuel injection
    - Power: 140 hp (104 kW; 142 PS) at 6300 rpm & 126 lb⋅ft (171 N⋅m) at 5000 rpm
    - Transmission: YS1, cable.

=== B18B1 ===
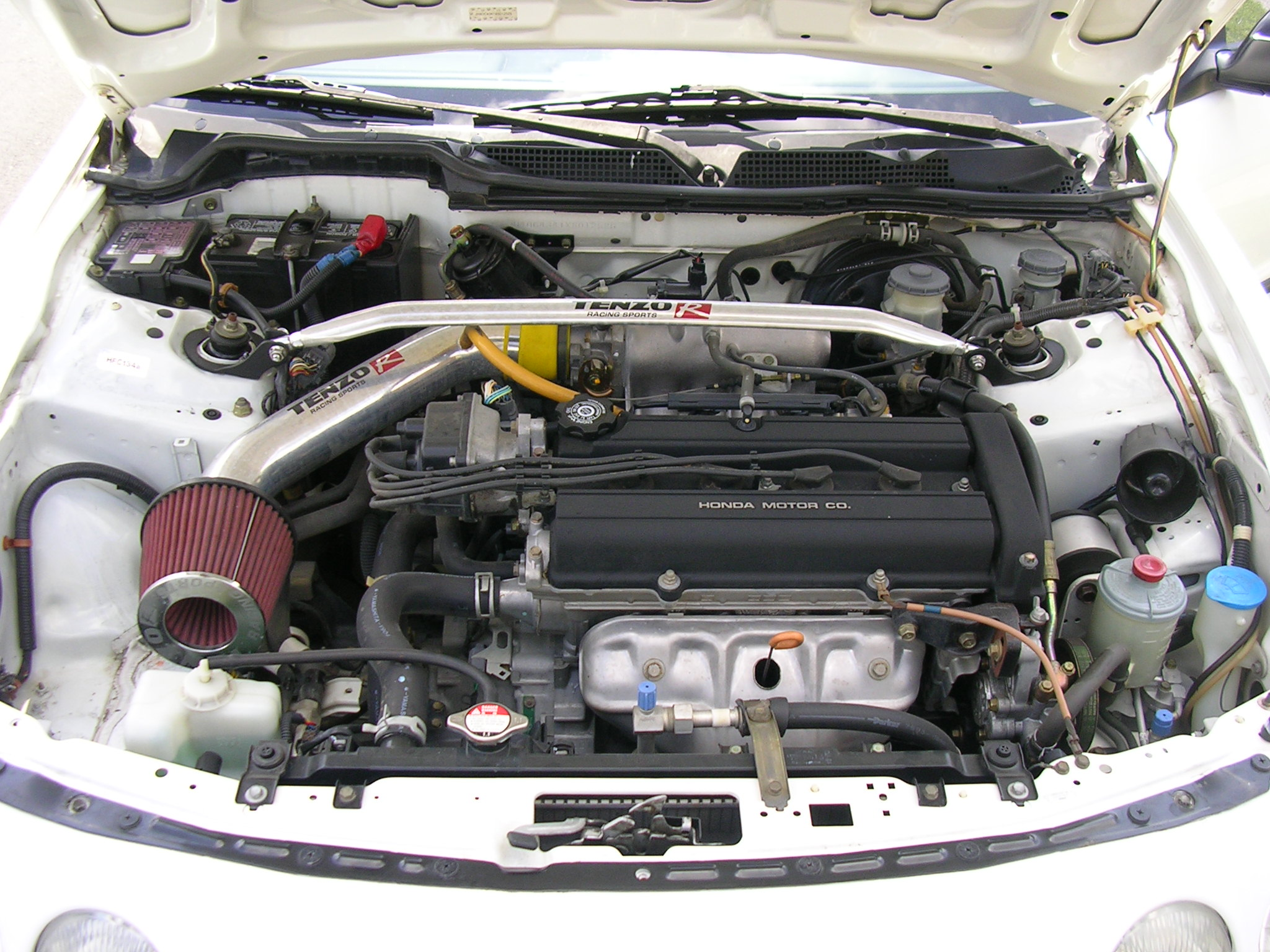
B18B2 Engine (RS 1999)

- DOHC Non VTEC
- ECU code:P75
- Found in:
  - 94-01 Integra RS/LS/SE/GS - DB7/DC4/DC3
  - 1994–2000 Honda Integra "RS/LS/GS/SE/(GSI Australia)" (DC4/DB7)
  - 1992–1996 JDM Honda Domani (MA5)
  - 1993–1994 JDM Honda Integra (DB7)
  - 1996–1999 JDM Honda Orthia (EL1)
    - Displacement: 1.8 L (1,834 cc; 111.9 cu in)
    - Compression: 9.2:1
    - Bore x Stroke: 81 mm × 89 mm (3.19 in × 3.50 in)
    - Rod Length: 137.01 mm (5.394 in)
    - Rod/Stroke Ratio: 1.56
    - Power: 140 bhp (104 kW; 142 PS) at 6300 rpm & 127 lb⋅ft (172 N⋅m) at 5200 rpm
    - Redline: 6800 rpm (7200 rpm on JDM Domani)
    - Rev Limit: 7300 rpm
    - Transmission: Y80/S80 Hydraulic
    - JDM version is marked B18B on the block without any number.
    - JDM version has 9.4:1 compression ratio whereas the US version has 9.2:1.
    - JDM version's higher compression ratio and factory tuning results in higher torque and power ratings
    - ECU code:P75

=== B18B2 ===
- DOHC Non-VTEC
- Found in:
  - 94-01 Integra RS/LS/SE/GS - DB7/DC4/DC3
  - 1994–2001Honda Integra "RS/LS/GS/SE/(GSI Australia)" (DC4/DB7)
    - Displacement: 1.8 L (1,834 cc; 111.9 cu in)
    - Compression: 9.2:1
    - Bore x Stroke: 81 mm × 89 mm (3.19 in × 3.50 in)
    - Rod Length: 137.01 mm (5.394 in)
    - Rod/Stroke Ratio: 1.56
    - Power: 143 bhp (107 kW; 145 PS) at 6300 rpm & 127 lb⋅ft (172 N⋅m) at 5200 rpm
    - Redline: 6800 rpm (7200 rpm on JDM Domani)
    - Rev Limit: 7300 rpm
    - Transmission: Y80/S80
    - ECU code: P75

=== B18B3 ===
- DOHC NON VTEC
- Found in:
  - 1992–1995 Honda Civic – Middle East & South Africa (SR3/SR4)
    - Displacement: 1.8 L (1,834 cc; 111.9 cu in)
    - Compression: 9.2:1
    - Bore x Stroke: 81 mm × 89 mm (3.19 in × 3.50 in)
    - Power: 141 hp (105 kW; 143 PS) at 6000 rpm & 123 lb⋅ft (167 N⋅m) at 5000 rpm
    - Transmission: Y80
    - Ecu code: P34

=== B18B4 ===
- DOHC NON VTEC
- Found in:
  - 1996–2000 Honda Civic – Middle East & South Africa Ballade (SO3/SO4)
  - 1999-2000 Honda Civic Si - Thailand
    - Displacement: 1.8 L (1,834 cc; 111.9 cu in)
    - Compression: 9.2:1
    - Bore x Stroke: 81 mm × 89 mm (3.19 in × 3.50 in)
    - Power: 103 kW (140 PS; 138 hp) at 6200 rpm & 126 lb⋅ft (171 N⋅m) at 4900 rpm
    - Transmission: S80
    - Ecu code:P6T

=== JDM B18C Type R ===
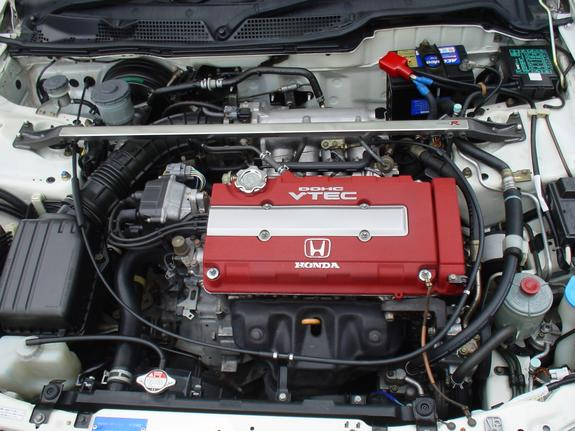
B18C in a Honda Integra (JDM)

- DOHC VTEC
- Identification: (98 spec) PR3 stamp on engine head, top radiator hose connected towards back of head
- Found in:
  - 95-00 Honda Integra JDM Type R (DC2 & DB8)
    - Redline: 8400 rpm
    - Rev Limit: 8900 rpm
    - Power: 197 hp (147 kW; 200 PS) at 8000 rpm & 181 N⋅m (133 lb⋅ft) at 7500 rpm (96 spec); 197 hp (147 kW; 200 PS) at 8000 rpm & 181 N⋅m (133 lb⋅ft) at 6200 rpm (98 spec)
    - Transmission: S80 with Helical LSD
    - S80 spec: J4D (96 Spec: 4.4 final drive), N3E (98 Spec: 4.785 final drive w/ 1.034 4th & .787 5th Gears)
    - Displacement: 1.8 L (1,797 cc; 109.7 cu in)
    - Compression: 11.1:1
    - Bore x Stroke: 81 mm × 87.2 mm (3.19 in × 3.43 in)
    - Rod Length: 137.9 mm (5.43 in)
    - Rod/Stroke Ratio: 1.58
    - VTEC engagement: 5800 rpm (96 spec) 6000 rpm (98 spec)
    - ECU code: P73-003 (96 spec) P73-013 (98 spec) P73-023 (00 spec)

JDM B18C

SiR-G/GSR

- VTEC
- Found in:
  - 95-98 Honda Integra JDM SiR/SiR II (DB8, DC2)
  - 98-99 Honda Integra JDM SiR-G (DB8, DC2)
  - 2000 Vemac RD180
    - Identification top rad hose connected towards front of head
    - Redline: 8000 rpm
    - Rev Limit: 8200 rpm
    - Power: 132.5 kW (180 PS; 178 bhp) at 7200 rpm & 126 lb⋅ft (171 N⋅m) at 6200 rpm
    - Displacement: 1.8 L (1,797 cc; 109.7 cu in)
    - Compression: 10.6:1
    - Bore x Stroke: 81 mm × 87.2 mm (3.19 in × 3.43 in)
    - ECU code: P72
    - VTEC engagement: 4400 rpm
    - Transmission Y80 (with optional LSD)

=== B18C1 ===
- DOHC VTEC
- Found in:
  - 1994–2001 Acura Integra GS-R (US; DC2 & DB8)
    - Displacement: 1.8 L (1,797 cc; 109.7 cu in)
    - Compression: 10.0:1
    - Bore x Stroke: 81 mm × 87.2 mm (3.19 in × 3.43 in)
    - Rod Length: 137.9 mm (5.429 in)
    - Rod/Stroke Ratio: 1.58
    - Power: 170 hp (127 kW; 172 PS) at 7600 rpm
    - Torque: 128 lb⋅ft (174 N⋅m) at 6200 rpm
    - Redline: 8100 rpm (Fuel Cut-off at 8300 rpm)
    - Secondary Runners Open: 5,750 rpm
    - VTEC engagement: 4400 rpm
    - ECU code: P72

=== B18C2 ===
- DOHC VTEC
- Found in:
  - 1994-2001 Honda Integra AUDM/NZDM VTi-R
    - Compression: 10.0:1
    - Displacement: 1.8 L (1,797 cc; 109.7 cu in)
    - Bore x Stroke: 81 mm × 87.2 mm (3.19 in × 3.43 in)
    - Power: 170 hp (127 kW; 172 PS) at 7300 rpm
    - Torque: 128 lb⋅ft (174 N⋅m) at 6200 rpm
    - Redline: 8000 rpm (Fuel cut-off at 8200 rpm)
    - VTEC engagement: 4500 rpm
    - IAB engagement: 6000 rpm
    - Transmission: Y80 (OBD1) - S80 (OBD2)
    - ECU code: P72

=== B18C3 ===
- DOHC VTEC
- Found in:
  - Honda Civic Asian market,
  - Honda Integra Asian market,
    - Power: 187 hp (139 kW; 190 PS) at 7600 rpm & 174 N⋅m (128 lb⋅ft) at 7500 rpm
    - Compression: 10.8:1
    - Bore x Stroke: 81 mm × 87.2 mm (3.19 in × 3.43 in)

=== B18C4 ===
- DOHC VTEC
- Found in:
  - 1992–2000 Ballade (Civic)
  - 1996–2000 UK Civic VTi 5-door Hatch (MB6)
  - 1996–2000 UK Civic 1.8i VTi-S (Limited Edition) 5-door Hatch (MB6)
  - 1996–2001 UK Civic Aerodeck 1.8i VTi 5-door Wagon (MC2)
  - 1998–1999 EU Civic Aerodeck 1.8i VTi 5-door Wagon (MC2)
  - 1998–1999 EU Civic 1.8i VTi 5-door Hatch (MB6)
    - Displacement: 1.8 L (1,797 cc; 109.7 cu in)
    - IAB open at 5750 rpm
    - VTEC engagement at 4300 rpm
    - Compression: 10.0:1
    - Power: 169 hp (126 kW; 171 PS) at 7600 rpm & 128 lb⋅ft (174 N⋅m) at 6200 rpm
    - Limit: 8400 rpm (fuel cut)
    - Transmission: S9B 4.26 final drive Torsen LSD.
    - ECU code: 37820-P9K-E11 (1997-1999) 37820-P9K-G11 (2000-2001) (uses OBD1 type ECU connectors)
    - bore x stroke: 81 mm × 87.2 mm (3.19 in × 3.43 in)

=== B18C5 (Type R) ===
- DOHC VTEC
- Found in:
  - 1997-1998, 1999 CDM, 2000-2001 Acura Integra Type R (North America)
    - Displacement: 1.8 L (1,797 cc; 109.7 cu in)
    - Compression: 10.6:1
    - Bore x Stroke: 81 mm × 87.2 mm (3.19 in × 3.43 in)
    - Rod Length: 137.9 mm (5.43 in)
    - Rod/Stroke Ratio: 1.58
    - Power: 195 hp (145 kW; 198 PS) at 7800 rpm & 130 lb⋅ft (176 N⋅m) at 7500 rpm
    - Redline: 8400 rpm (Fuel cut-off at 9000 rpm)
    - VTEC engagement: 5700 rpm
    - Transmission: S80 w/LSD

=== B18C6 (Type R) ===
- DOHC VTEC
- Found in:
  - 1998–2001 Honda Integra UK/EU Type R
    - Displacement: 1,797 cc (1.8 L; 109.7 cu in)
    - Compression: 11.1:1
    - Air intake diameter: 2.4 in (62 mm)
    - Bore: 81 mm × 87.2 mm (3.19 in × 3.43 in)
    - Rod Length: 137.9 mm (5.43 in)
    - Rod/Stroke Ratio: 1.58
    - Power: 190 PS (140 kW; 187 hp) at 7900 rpm & 131 lb⋅ft (178 N⋅m) at 7300 rpm
    - Redline: 8400 rpm
    - Rev Limit: 8600 rpm
    - VTEC engagement: 5900 rpm
    - Transmission: S80 w/LSD
    - ECU code: 37820-P73-G01

=== B18C7 (Type R) ===
- DOHC VTEC
- Found in:
  - 1999-2001 Honda Integra AUDM/NZDM Type R
    - Displacement: 1.8 L (1,797 cc; 109.7 cu in)
    - Compression: 11.1:1
    - Air intake diameter: 62 mm (2.4 in)
    - Bore x Stroke: 81 mm × 87.2 mm (3.19 in × 3.43 in)
    - Rod Length: 137.9 mm (5.43 in)
    - Rod/Stroke Ratio: 1.58
    - Power: 189 hp (141 kW; 192 PS) at 8200 rpm & 172 N⋅m (127 lb⋅ft) at 7500 rpm
    - Redline: 8400 rpm
    - Rev Limit: 8800 rpm
    - VTEC engagement: 5800 rpm

== B20 ==
=== B20B-B20B4 ===
- 1996–1998 specs
- non-VTEC
  - Found in: Honda CR-V (US/JDM), JDM Orthia, Stepwgn, S-MX
    - Displacement: 2.0 L (1,973 cc; 120.4 cu in)
    - Power: 126–142–140 hp (94–106–104 kW; 128–144–142 PS) at 5400 rpm
    - Torque: 133 lb⋅ft (180 N⋅m) at 4800 rpm
    - Rod length: 137 mm (5.4 in)
    - Compression: B20B4 (AO PISTONS) 8.8:1 (P8R) or 9.2:1 (P75)
    - Bore x Stroke: 84 mm × 89 mm (3.31 in × 3.50 in)
    - Redline: 6500 rpm
    - No Knock Sensor
    - Low Compression engine

=== B20B ===
- 1999 - 2001 specs

Non VTEC

- Found in: US CR-V as a B20B8, CR-V and Honda Orthia as a B20B
- Displacement: 2.0 L (1,973 cc; 120.4 cu in)
- Power: 148–150 hp (110–112 kW; 150–152 PS) at 6200 rpm
- Torque: 140 lb⋅ft (190 N⋅m) at 5500 rpm
- Rod length: 137 mm (5.4 in)
- Compression: 9.4:1 (P8R)-9.6:1 (P75)
- Bore x Stroke: 84 mm × 89 mm (3.31 in × 3.50 in)
- Head Cylinder : P75-5
- Redline: 6800 rpm

=== B20Z2 ===
- 1999 - 2001 specs

Non-VTEC

- Found in: US CR-V as a B20Z2, CR-V and Honda Orthia as a B20B
- Displacement: 2.0 L (1,973 cc; 120.4 cu in)
- Power: 148–150 hp (110–112 kW; 150–152 PS) at 6200 rpm
- Torque: 140 lb⋅ft (190 N⋅m) at 5500 rpm
- Rod length: 137 mm (5.4 in)
- Compression: 9.4:1 (P8R)-9.6:1 (P75)
- Bore x Stroke: 84 mm × 89 mm (3.31 in × 3.50 in)
- Redline: 6800 rpm
- Some came with limited production head P8R which had 33 mm intake valves (normally found on VTEC B-series) vs 31 mm intake (non VTEC B series), and the head had an 84 mm shrouding vs 81 mm for all other B series heads. They also had a thinner head gasket which yielded a higher compression ratio vs the normal B20B of 9.2:1.

=== B20B JDM ===
- 1995–1997 spec
- Non-VTEC
  - Found in: JDM Honda Orthia, CR-V
    - Displacement: 1,973 cc (120.4 cu in)
    - Power: 126–148 hp (94–110 kW; 128–150 PS) at 6200 rpm
    - Torque: 178 N⋅m (131 lb⋅ft) at 5200 rpm [4500 rpm 2.0 GX-S]
    - Rod length: 137 mm (5.4 in)
    - Compression: 9.2:1
    - Bore x stroke: 84 mm × 89 mm (3.31 in × 3.50 in)
    - Redline: 6700 rpm
    - Rev Limit: 7300 rpm
- 1998-2002 specs
- Non-VTEC
- Displacement: 2.0 L (1,973 cc; 120.4 cu in)
- Power: 150 hp (112 kW; 152 PS) at 6300 rpm
- Torque: 184 N⋅m (136 lb⋅ft) at 4500 rpm
- Rod length: 137 mm (5.4 in)
- Compression: 9.6:1
- Bore x stroke: 84 mm × 89 mm (3.31 in × 3.50 in)
- Redline: 6500 rpm
- Rev Limit: 7200 rpm
- Some came with limited production head P8R which had 33mm intake valves (normally found on VTEC B-series) vs 31mm intake (non VTEC B series), and the head had an 84mm shrouding vs 81mm for all other B series heads.
- Source http://www.honda.co.jp/auto-archive/

== B20A/B20B ==
The B20A3 and B20A5 are the predecessor to the B family. All B-series engines were based from the B20A, but most engine components are not compatible. For more information, refer to the F3-series Honda race car that used a B20A engine. Also see Honda B20A engine.

== See also ==
- List of Honda engines
