= Three-stage VTEC =

Three-stage VTEC is a multi-stage implementation of Honda's VTEC and VTEC-E (colloquially known as dual VTEC) technology, implemented in some of the company's D series engines from 1995 to the present day, allowing the engine to achieve both fuel efficiency and power. VTEC-E (for "Efficiency") is a form of VTEC that closes off one intake valve at low speed to give good economy at low power levels, while "VTEC" is a mode that allows for greater power at high speed, while giving relatively efficient performance at "normal" operating speeds. "Three-stage VTEC" gives both types in one engine, at the cost of greater complexity and expense.

== Stage 1 – 12-valve VTEC-E ==
VTEC-E (economy) was designed to achieve better fuel economy, at the cost of performance. The engine operates in "12-valve mode", where one intake valve per cylinder in the 16-valve engine remains mostly closed to attain lean burn. The lean burn mode gets the air to fuel ratio above the 14.7:1 stoichiometric ratio and thus enables extra fuel saving. This works similarly to the principle which gave the Buick "Nailhead" V8 its reputation for high torque (in that case, the engine had notably small intake valves, giving good torque, but limiting peak power). In an engine running at lower rpm, a smaller intake valve area forces a given volume of air to flow into the chamber faster; this causes the fuel to atomize better, and therefore burn far more efficiently. An average of 30 km/L (70.6 mpg_{‑US}) can be achieved while in the lean burn at a constant speed of 60 km/h (37 mph).

== Stage 2 – 16 valve ==
At about 2500 rpm, the engine is able to switch to the 16-valve mode, which is typical of classic engines. The first VTEC solenoid is opened and directs the oil to the sliding pin that connects the rocker arms of the intake valves with the first intake valve's lobe. Thus, all two intake valves move at the normal profile of that lobe. The engine's performance is usual to the non-VTEC engines. This mode is suitable for mid-range speeds.

== Stage 3 – 16-valve VTEC ==
From about 5200 rpm to the rev limiter, the engine's high-lift VTEC cam lobe is engaged. A higher lift lowers restriction even more, giving the highest airflow. If one built a non-VTEC engine to make the maximum power, the trade-off would be very low efficiency at low speeds in order to get the most flow possible at high speeds. A three-stage allows the engine to run in "economy", "standard", and "high power" modes, while a VTEC only gives "standard" and "high power", and a VTEC-E only gives "economy" and "standard".
