= Honda D engine =

Japanese automobile engines

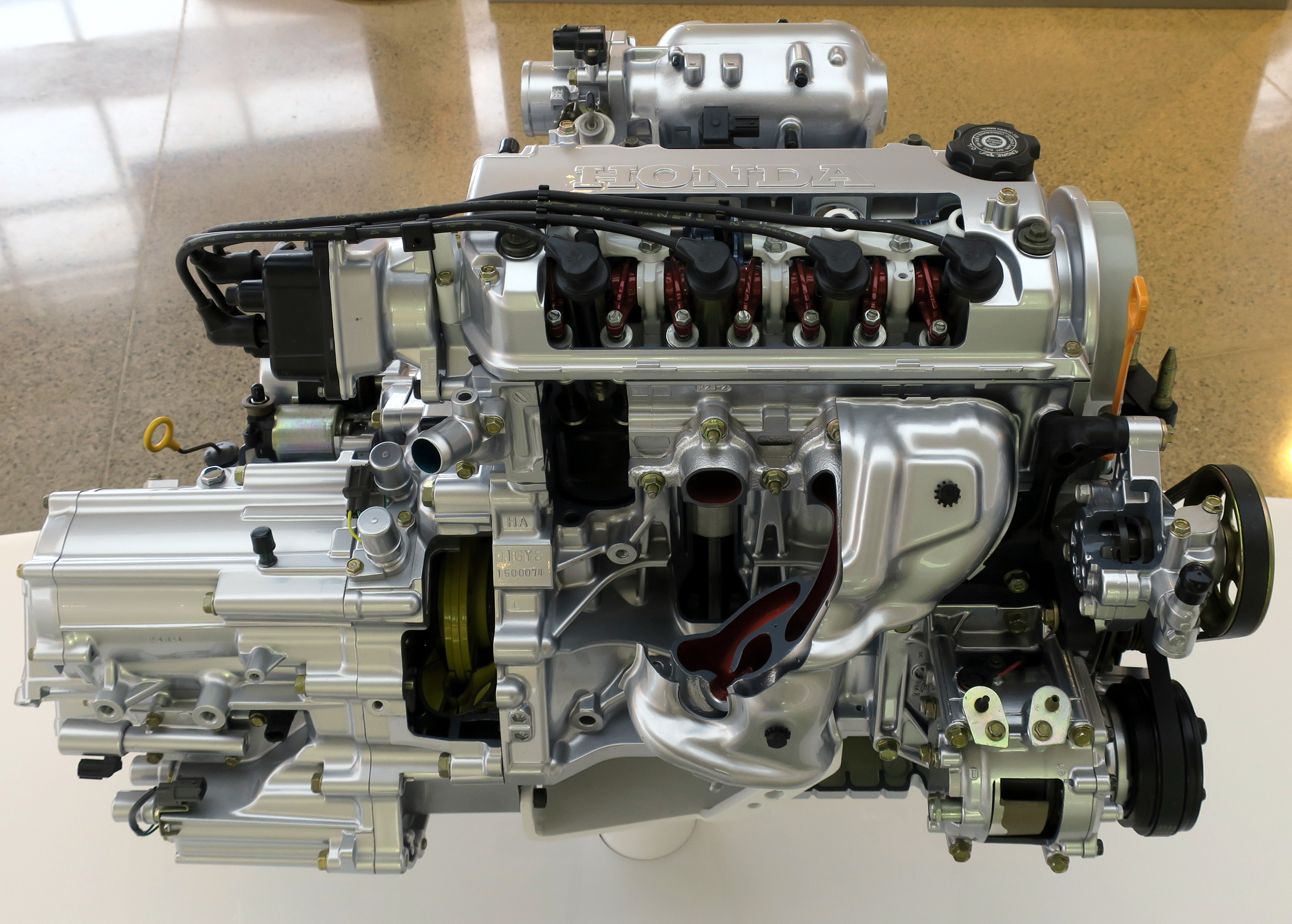

Overview
- Manufacturer: Honda
- Production: 1983–2005

Layout
- Configuration: Naturally aspirated inline-4
- Displacement: 1.2–1.7 L; 72.8–101.8 cu in (1,193–1,668 cc)
- Cylinder bore: 72 mm (2.83 in); 73.7 mm (2.90 in); 74 mm (2.91 in); 75 mm (2.95 in)
- Piston stroke: 67.5 mm (2.66 in); 76 mm (2.99 in); 79 mm (3.11 in); 84.5 mm (3.33 in); 86.5 mm (3.41 in); 90 mm (3.54 in); 94.4 mm (3.72 in)
- Valvetrain: SOHC with 2, 3 & 4 valves x cyl. DOHC with 4 valves x cyl. (VTEC in some SOHC versions)
- Compression ratio: 8.6:1–12.5:1

RPM range
- Max. engine speed: 5,500–7,200 rpm

Combustion
- Fuel system: Programmed carburetor; Programmed fuel injection
- Fuel type: Gasoline
- Cooling system: Water-cooled

Output
- Power output: 66–140 PS (49–103 kW; 65–138 hp)
- Torque output: 88–160 N⋅m (65–118 lb⋅ft)

The Honda D-series inline-four cylinder engine is used in a variety of compact models, most commonly the Honda Civic, CRX, Logo, Stream, and first-generation Integra. Engine displacement ranges between 1.2 and 1.7 liters. The D series engine is either SOHC or DOHC, and might include VTEC variable valve lift. Power ranges from 66 PS (49 kW) in the Logo to 140 PS (103 kW) in the Japanese market (JDM) Civic. D-series production commenced in 1983 (for the 1984 model year) and ended in 2005. D-series engine technology culminated with production of the D15B three-stage VTEC (D15Z7) which was available in markets outside of the United States. Earlier versions of this engine also used a single port fuel delivery system called PGM-CARB, signifying that the carburetor was computer controlled.

== D12 series engines (1.2 liter) ==
=== D12A ===
- Found in:
  - 1986-1988 Honda City GG (Japanese Market)
    - Displacement: 1237 cc (75.5 cu in)
    - Bore and Stroke: 72 mm x 76 mm (2.83 in x 2.99 in)
    - Compression: 9.5:1
    - Power: 76 PS (56 kW; 75 hp) at 6,500 rpm
    - Torque: 10.0 kg⋅m (98 N⋅m; 72 lb⋅ft) at 4,000 rpm
    - Valvetrain: SOHC (4 valves per cylinder)
    - Fuel Control: Single Carburetor

=== D12B1 ===
- Found in:
  - 1988-1990 Honda Civic DX (ED1/EC7; European Market)
    - Displacement: 1,193 cc (72.8 cu in)
    - Bore and Stroke: 75.0 mm × 67.5 mm (2.95 in × 2.66 in)
    - Compression: 8.6:1
    - Power: 74 PS (54 kW; 73 hp) at 6300 rpm
    - Torque: 88 N⋅m (9.0 kg⋅m; 64.9 lb⋅ft) at 3500 rpm
    - Valvetrain: SOHC (4 valves per cylinder)
    - Fuel Control: Single Carburetor PGM-CARB

== D13 series engines (1.3 liter) ==
=== D13B1 ===
- Found in:
  - 1988–1991 Honda Civic DX (ED5/EC8; European Market)
  - 1991–1995 Honda Civic DX (European Market)
    - Displacement: 1,343 cc (82.0 cu in)
    - Bore and Stroke: 75.0 mm × 76.0 mm (2.95 in × 2.99 in)
    - Compression : 9.5:1
    - Power : 76 PS (56 kW; 75 hp) at 6300 rpm
    - Torque: 102 N⋅m (75 lb⋅ft; 10.4 kg⋅m) at 3100 rpm
    - Valvetrain : SOHC (4 valves per cylinder)
    - Fuel Control : Single Carburetor CARB

=== D13B2 ===
- Found in:
  - 1992–1995 Honda Civic DX/EX (European Market)
    - Displacement: 1,343 cc (82.0 cu in)
    - Bore and Stroke: 75.0 mm × 76.0 mm (2.95 in × 2.99 in)
    - Compression: 9.0:1
    - Power: 75 PS (55 kW; 74 hp) at 6300 rpm
    - Torque: 102 N⋅m (10.4 kg⋅m; 75 lb⋅ft) at 3100 rpm
    - Valvetrain: SOHC, four valves per cylinder
    - Cam Gear: 38 teeth
    - Piston Code: PM1G
    - Head Code: PM3
    - Fuel Control: Single electronic carburetor PGM-CARB
    - ECU: P01 OBD-0

=== D13B4 ===
- Found in:
  - 1996–2002 Honda City LXi/EXi/DX, 1995-2000 Honda Civic EK2
    - Displacement : 1,343 cc (82.0 cu in)
    - Bore and Stroke : 75.0 mm × 76.0 mm (2.95 in × 2.99 in)
    - Compression: 9.75:1
    - Power: 95 PS (70 kW) at 6500 rpm (City)
      91 PS (67 kW) at 6,300 rpm (Civic)
    - Torque: 119 N⋅m (12.1 kg⋅m; 88 lb⋅ft) at 4700 rpm (City)
      114 N⋅m (11.6 kg⋅m; 84 lb⋅ft) at 4800 rpm (Civic)
    - Valvetrain : SOHC (four valves per cylinder), 16 valves
    - Fuel Control : Multi-point fuel Injection, PGM-FI

=== D13B7 ===
- Found in:
  - 1998–2001 Honda Logo
    - Displacement : 1,343 cc (82.0 cu in)
    - Bore and Stroke : 75.0 x 76.0 mm
    - Compression : 9.2:1
    - Power : 66 PS (48.5 kW; 65.1 hp) at 5000 rpm
    - Torque : 11.3 kg⋅m (110.8 N⋅m; 81.7 lbf⋅ft) at 2500 rpm
    - Valvetrain : SOHC (2 valves per cylinder)
    - Fuel Control : Multi-point fuel Injection, PGM-FI

=== D13C ===
- Found in:
  - 1989–1994 Honda City CE, CE Fit, CE Select, CG, CR-i, CR-i limited, CZ-i, New Fit (Japanese Market)
    - Displacement : 1,296 cc (79.1 cu in)
    - Bore and Stroke : 73.7mm x 76.0 mm
    - Compression: 9.6:1
    - Power : 100 PS (73.5 kW; 98.6 hp) at 6500 rpm
    - Torque : 11.6 kg⋅m (113.8 N⋅m; 83.9 lb⋅ft) at 5500 rpm
    - Valvetrain : SOHC (4 valves per cylinder)
    - Fuel Control : Multi-point fuel Injection, PGM-FI

== D14 series engines (1.4 liter) ==
=== D14A1 ===
- Found in:
  - 1987–1991 Honda Civic GL and 1990 CRX (European market)
  - October 1989 – 1994 Honda Concerto GL (European market)
    - Displacement: 1,396 cc (85.2 cu in)
    - Bore and Stroke: 75.0 mm × 79.0 mm (2.95 in × 3.11 in)
    - Compression: 9.3:1
    - Power: 90 PS (66 kW; 89 hp) at 6,300 rpm
      88 PS (65 kW; 87 hp) in the Concerto
    - Torque: 11.4 kg⋅m (112 N⋅m; 82 lb⋅ft) at 4,500 rpm
    - Valvetrain: SOHC (four valves per cylinder)
    - Fuel Control: Dual Carburetor PGM-CARB
    - Piston Code: PM2

=== D14A2 ===
- Found in:
  - 1995–1997 Honda Civic MA8 (European Market)
    - Displacement : 1,396 cc (85.2 cu in)
    - Bore and Stroke : 75.0 mm × 79.0 mm (2.95 in × 3.11 in)
    - Compression: 9.2:1
    - ECU code: P1J
    - Power : 90 PS (66 kW; 89 hp) at 6,100 rpm
    - Torque : 117 N⋅m (11.9 kg⋅m; 86 lb⋅ft) at 5,000 rpm
    - Valvetrain : SOHC (4 valves per cylinder)
    - Fuel Control : OBD-1, MPFIMulti-point fuel Injection, PGM-FI
    - Redline : 6,800 rpm
    - Fuel cutout : 7,250 rpm

=== D14A3 ===
- Found in:
  - 1996–2000 Honda Civic 1.4i EJ9 (European Market)
    - Displacement : 1,396 cc (85.2 cu in)
    - Bore and Stroke : 75.0 mm × 79.0 mm (2.95 in × 3.11 in)
    - Compression: 9.1:1
    - ECU code: P3X
    - Power : 75 PS (55 kW; 74 hp) at 6,000 rpm
    - Torque : 109 N⋅m (11.1 kg⋅m; 80 lb⋅ft) at 3,000 rpm
    - Valvetrain : SOHC (4 valves per cylinder), non VTEC
    - Redline : 6,800 rpm
    - Fuel cut: 7,200 rpm
    - Fuel Control : OBD2-a, DPFI (SFi – Simplified Fuel injection), 1+3 2+4 injectors thrown together
    - Transmission: S40

=== D14A4 ===
- Found in:
  - 1996–1998 Honda Civic 1.4iS EJ9 (European Market)
    - Displacement : 1,396 cc (85.2 cu in)
    - Bore and Stroke : 75.0 mm × 79.0 mm (2.95 in × 3.11 in)
    - Compression: 9.1:1
    - Piston code: P3Y
    - Piston Compression height: 29.5 mm
    - Piston dish volume: -5.4 cc
    - ECU code: P3Y
    - Big-end bore: 43 mm
    - Rod length (center to center): 138 mm
    - Power: 90 PS (66 kW; 89 hp) at 6,300 rpm
    - Torque : 124 N⋅m (12.6 kg⋅m; 91 lb⋅ft) at 4,500 rpm
    - Valvetrain : SOHC, four valves per cylinder, non VTEC
    - Red line : 6,800 rpm
    - Fuel cut: 7,200 rpm
    - Fuel Control : OBD2-a, DPFI (SFi – Simplified Fuel injection), 1+4 2+3 injectors thrown together
    - Transmission : S40 (or S4PA for 4AT)
    - Deck Height : 207 mm

The D14A3 and D14A4 engines are identical, the difference is the addition of a small gasket under the throttle body in the D14A3 which restricts the air intake of the engine, lowering the power output. This was done in some European countries to suit local insurance categories.

=== D14A5 ===
- Found in:
  - 1995 - 1997 Honda Civic MA8 (European Market)
    - Displacement : 1,396 cc (85.2 cu in)
    - Bore and Stroke : 75.0 mm × 79.0 mm (2.95 in × 3.11 in)
    - Compression: 9.2:1
    - ECU code: P1J
    - Power : 75 PS (55 kW; 74 hp) at 6,100 rpm
    - Valvetrain : SOHC (4 valves per cylinder)
    - Fuel Control : OBD-1, MPFIMulti-point fuel Injection, PGM-FI
    - Redline : 6,800 rpm
    - Fuel cutout : 7,250 rpm

The D14A2 and D14A5 engines are identical, the difference is the addition of a small gasket under the throttle body in D14A5 which restricts the air intake of the engine, lowering the power output. This was done in some European countries to suit local insurance categories.

=== D14A7 ===
- Found in:
  - 1997–2000 Honda Civic 1.4i MB2/MB8 (UK Market)
    - Displacement: 1,396 cc (85.2 cu in)
    - Compression: 9.0:1
    - Power: 75 PS (55 kW; 74 hp) at 6,000 rpm
    - Torque: 112 N⋅m (83 lb⋅ft) at 3,000 rpm
    - Valvetrain: SOHC (4 valves per cylinder), non VTEC

=== D14A8 ===
- Found in:
  - 1997–2000 Honda Civic 1.4iS MB2/MB8. UK and (at least) Germany.
    - Displacement : 1,396 cc (85.2 cu in)
    - Compression: 9.0:1
    - Power : 90 PS (66 kW; 89 hp) at 6,400 rpm
    - Torque : 120 N⋅m (12.2 kg⋅m; 88.5 lb⋅ft) at 4,800 rpm
    - Valvetrain : SOHC (4 valves per cylinder), non VTEC

The D14A7 and D14A8 engines are identical, the difference is only one small gasket under the throttle body in D14A7 which restricts the air intake of the engine, this happen in some European countries.

They are also almost identical to the D14A3 and D14A4 engines. Differences are only in the compression ratio and some different mounted components.

=== D14Z1 ===
- Found in:
  - 1999–2000 Honda Civic EJ9 (1.4i, Europe)
    - Compression: 9.7:1
    - Power: 75 PS (55 kW; 74 hp)
    - Valvetrain: SOHC, 4 valves per cylinder, non VTEC
    - Bore and Stroke: 75.0 mm × 79.0 mm (2.95 in × 3.11 in)
    - Piston Code: phxg
    - Rod Length: 138 mm
    - Rod/Stroke: 1.747
    - Redline: 6800 rpm
    - Fuel cut: 7200 rpm

=== D14Z2 ===
- Found in:
  - 1999–2000 Honda Civic EJ9 (1.4iS, Europe)
    - Displacement: 1,396 cc (85.2 cu in)
    - Compression: 9.7:1
    - Power: 90 PS (66 kW; 89 hp) at 6,300 rpm
    - Valvetrain: SOHC, 4 valves per cylinder, non VTEC
    - Bore and Stroke: 75.0 mm × 79.0 mm (2.95 in × 3.11 in)
    - Piston Code: phxg
    - Redline: 6,800 rpm
    - Fuel cut: 7,200 rpm

The D14Z1 and D14Z2 engines are identical, the difference is only one small gasket under the throttle body in D14Z1 which restricts the air intake of the engine, this happen in some European countries.

=== D14Z3 ===
- Found in:
  - 1999–2000 Honda Civic MB2 (1.4i, Europe), MB8 (1.4 SR, UK Market)
    - Displacement : 1,396 cc (85.2 cu in)
    - Compression: 9.0:1
    - Power : 75 PS (55 kW; 74 hp) at 5,700 rpm
    - Torque : 112 N⋅m (11.4 kg⋅m; 83 lb⋅ft) at 3,000 rpm
    - Valvetrain : SOHC, 4 valves per cylinder, non VTEC
    - Redline: 6,800 rpm
    - Fuel cut : 7,200 rpm

=== D14Z4 ===
- Found in:
  - 1999–2001 Honda Civic MB2 (1.4iS), MB8 (1.4SR; UK Market)
    - Displacement : 1,396 cc (85.2 cu in)
    - Bore and Stroke : 75.0 mm × 79.0 mm (2.95 in × 3.11 in)
    - Compression: 9.0:1
    - Power : 90 PS (66 kW; 89 hp) at 6400 rpm
    - Torque : 120 N⋅m (89 lb⋅ft) at 4800 rpm
    - Valvetrain : SOHC, four valves per cylinder, non VTEC
    - Redline: 6800 rpm
    - Fuel cut : 7200 rpm

The D14Z3 and D14Z4 engines are identical, the difference is only one small gasket under the throttle body in D14Z3 which restricts the air intake of the engine, this happen in some European countries.

=== D14Z5 ===
- Found in:
  - 2001–2005 Honda Civic 1.4iS, LS (European market: ES4 nfl)
    - Engine Name: D14Z5
    - Displacement: 1396 cc
    - Bore and Stroke: 75 mm x 79 mm
    - Compression: 10.4:1
    - Cylinder Head: 16 valves, SOHC
    - Red Line: 6400 rpm
    - Fuel Cutoff: 6600 rpm
    - Fuel System: Honda PGM-FI
    - Rod/Stroke Ratio: ?:?
    - Stock BHP Rating: 90 PS (66 kW; 89 hp) at 5600 rpm
    - Stock torque rating: 130 N⋅m (96 lb⋅ft) at 4300 rpm
    - Rated Fuel Consumption: 5.2–6.5 L/100 km (45.2–36.2 mpg_{‑US})
    - Ecu Code: PMA

=== D14Z6 ===
- Found in:
  - 2001–2005 Honda Civic 1.4 LS (European market: EP1, EU4, EU7, ES4 fl, ES6)
    - Engine Name: D14Z6
    - Displacement: 1,396 cc
    - Bore and Stroke: 75 mm x 79 mm
    - Compression: 10.4:1
    - Cylinder Head: 16 valves, SOHC
    - Red Line: 6,400 rpm
    - Fuel Cutoff: 6,600 rpm
    - Fuel System: Honda PGM-FI
    - Rod/Stroke Ratio: ?:?
    - Stock BHP Rating: 90 hp (66 kW) at 5,600 rpm
    - Stock torque rating: 130 Nm at 4,300 rpm
    - Rated Fuel Consumption: 5.2–6.5 L/100 km (45.2–36.2 mpg_{‑US})
    - Ecu Code: PMA

== D15 series engines (1.5 liter) ==
=== D15A1 ===
- Found In:
  - 1984–1987 Honda CRX
    - Displacement : 1,488 cc
    - Bore and Stroke : 74.0 x 86.5 mm
    - Compression: 9.2:1
    - Power : 76 hp (57 kW; 77 PS) at 5,500 rpm
    - Torque : 84 lb⋅ft (114 N⋅m) at 3,500 rpm
    - Valvetrain : SOHC (3 valves per cylinder)
    - Fuel Control : OBD-0 12/v PGM-CARB
    - Redline : 6,500 rpm
    - Economy : 31/38 mpg
    - Head code : EW-1
    - ECU : –
    - Transmission : DA48
    - Gear ratios : 2.38/ 1.76/ 1.18/ 0.85/ 0.71
    - Final drive ratio : 4.27

=== D15A2 ===
- Found in :
  - 1984–1987 Honda CRX HF
    - Displacement : 1,488 cc
    - Compression: 8.7:1
    - Power : 60 hp (45 kW) at 5,550 rpm
    - Torque : 73 lb⋅ft (99 N⋅m) at 3,500 rpm
    - Redline : 5,500 rpm
    - Fuel induction: 3 barrel carburetor w/ vacuum secondary
    - Valvetrain : 12v CVCC SOHC (8V '84-'86) (8 (4) intake, 4 exhaust, 4 aux (for cvcc chamber))
    - Economy : 49/54 mpg
    - Gear ratios :
      - 49-state:
        - 3.272/1.666/1.041/0.807/0.714 (Final 4.066)
      - High Altitude:
        - 2.916/1.526/0.960/0.750/0.655 (Final 3.578)
      - California:
        - 2.916/1.526/0.960/0.750/0.655 (Final 2.954)
  - 1984–1987 Honda CRX DX
    - Displacement : 1,488 cc
    - Compression: 9.6:1
    - Power : 78 hp (58 kW; 79 PS) at 6,000 rpm
    - Torque : 73 lb⋅ft (99 N⋅m) at 3,500 rpm
    - Redline : 6,500 rpm
    - Fuel induction: 3 barrel carburetor w/ vacuum secondary
    - Valvetrain : 12V CVCC SOHC (8 intake, 4 exhaust, 4 aux (for cvcc chamber))
    - Economy : 38mpg
    - Gear ratios : 2.916/1.764/1.181/0.846/0.714 (Final 4.266)
  - 1987 Honda Civic Wagon RT4WD (Canadian Model)
    - Displacement : 1,488 cc
    - Compression: 9.2:1
    - Power : 76 hp (57 kW; 77 PS) at 5,500 rpm
    - Torque : 84 lb⋅ft (114 N⋅m) at 3,500 rpm
    - Valvetrain : 12 valves, SOHC
    - Economy : 31-38 mpg

=== D15A3 ===
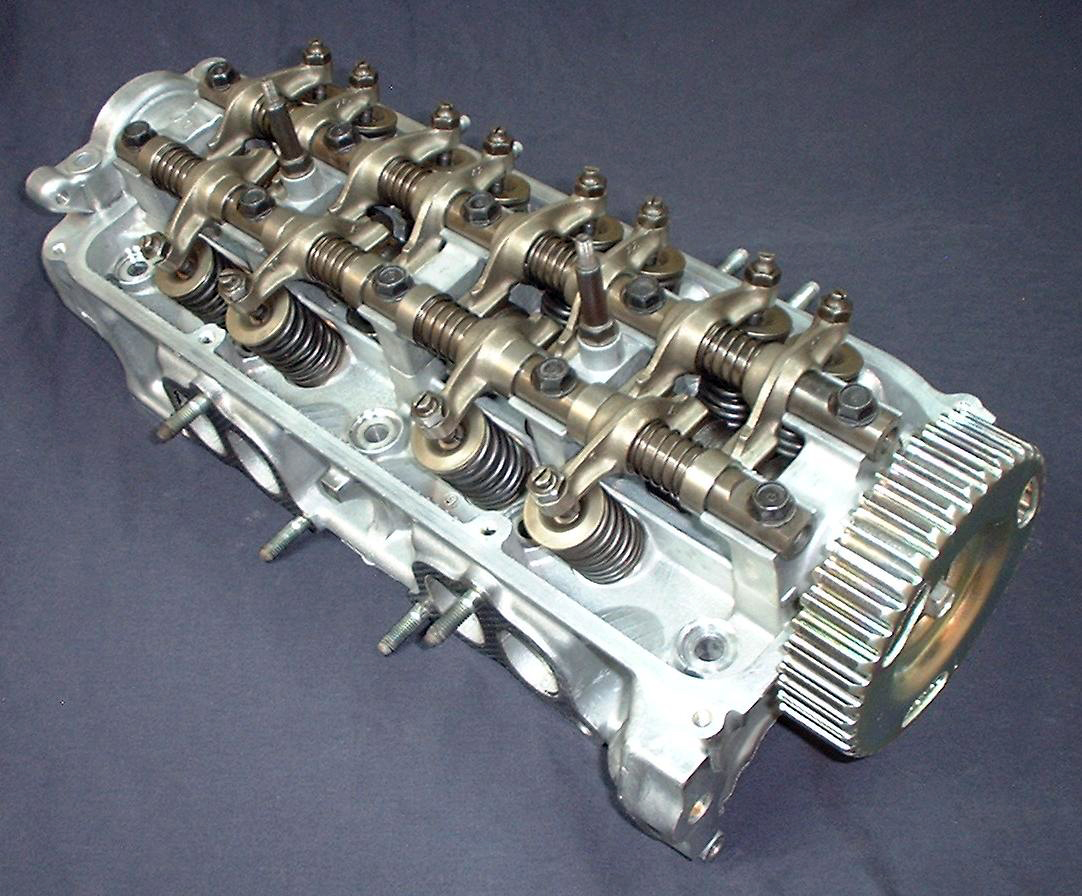
D15A3 cylinder head showing three valves per cylinder configuration

- Found in:
  - 1985–1987 Honda CRX Si and 1987 Civic Si (AU/NZ)
  - Stamped with EW3/EW4 1985-1986 before switching to D15A3 stamp in 1987
  - 1985–1987 Honda Civic 1.5i (Europe)
  - 1984–1987 Honda CRX 1.5i (Europe)
  - 1986–1987 Honda Civic Si Hatch (US)
    - Displacement : 1,488 cc (90.8 cu in)
    - Bore and Stroke : 74 mm × 86.5 mm (2.91 in × 3.41 in)
    - Compression: 8.7:1
    - Power : 91 hp (68 kW; 92 PS) at 5500 rpm
    - Power : 100 PS (74 kW) at 5750 rpm (Europe)
    - Torque : 93 lb·ft (12.9 kg/m, 126 Nm) at 4500 rpm
    - Valvetrain : SOHC (12 valves, three per cylinder )
    - Fuel Control : PGM-FI2

=== D15A4 ===
- 92 hp (70 kW, 94 ps)@5500 rpm
- 93 lbft (12.9 kg/m, 126 Nm)@4500 rpm

=== D15A5 ===
- 93 hp (70 kW, 94 ps)@5600 rpm 100 PS (74 kW)@5750 rpm (Europe)
- 93 lbft (12.9 kg/m, 126 Nm)@4500 rpm

Found at: torquecars.com/honda/d15-tuning

=== D15B ===
- Found in:
  - 1988 Honda CRX 1.5X (rare)
  - 1990 Honda Civic 25XXT Formula (Japanese Market)
  - Honda Civic Ferio MX (Japanese Market) EG8
  - 1998–2001 Honda Capa GA4 (Japanese Market)
  - 1988-2001 Honda Civic SH4 EF1
    - Displacement : 1,493 cc (91.1 cu in)
    - Bore and Stroke : 75 mm × 84.5 mm (2.95 in × 3.33 in)
    - Compression: 9.2:1
    - Power: 103 hp (77.23 kW, 105 PS) at 6800 rpm
    - Torque: 14.1 kgm (133.4 Nm) at 5200 rpm
    - Rev limiter: 7200 rpm
    - Valvetrain: SOHC (4 valves per cylinder)
    - Fuel Control: Twin carburetor PGM-CARB/ Fuel Injected

==== D15B VTEC ====
- Found in:
  - 1992–1995 Honda Civic VTi (EG4, Japanese Market)
  - 1992–1995 Honda Civic Ferio VTi (EG8, Japanese Market)
  - 1992–1998 Honda CRX Del Sol (Japanese Market)
    - Bore and Stroke: 75.0 × 84.5 mm
    - Displacement: 1,493 cc (91.1 cu in)
    - Rod Length: 137 mm
    - Rod/Stroke: 1.63
    - Compression: 9.3:1
    - Power: 130 PS (96 kW; 128 hp) at 6800 rpm
    - Torque: 138 N⋅m (102 lb⋅ft) at 5200 rpm
    - VTEC Switchover : 4,600 rpm
    - Redline: 7200 rpm
    - Rev-limiter: 7200 rpm
    - Valvetrain: SOHC VTEC (4 valves per cylinder)
    - Connecting rod big end diameter : 48 mm
    - Fuel Control: OBD-1
    - Head Code: P08
    - ECU Code: P08 (small case ECU)***

==== D15B Three-stage VTEC ====
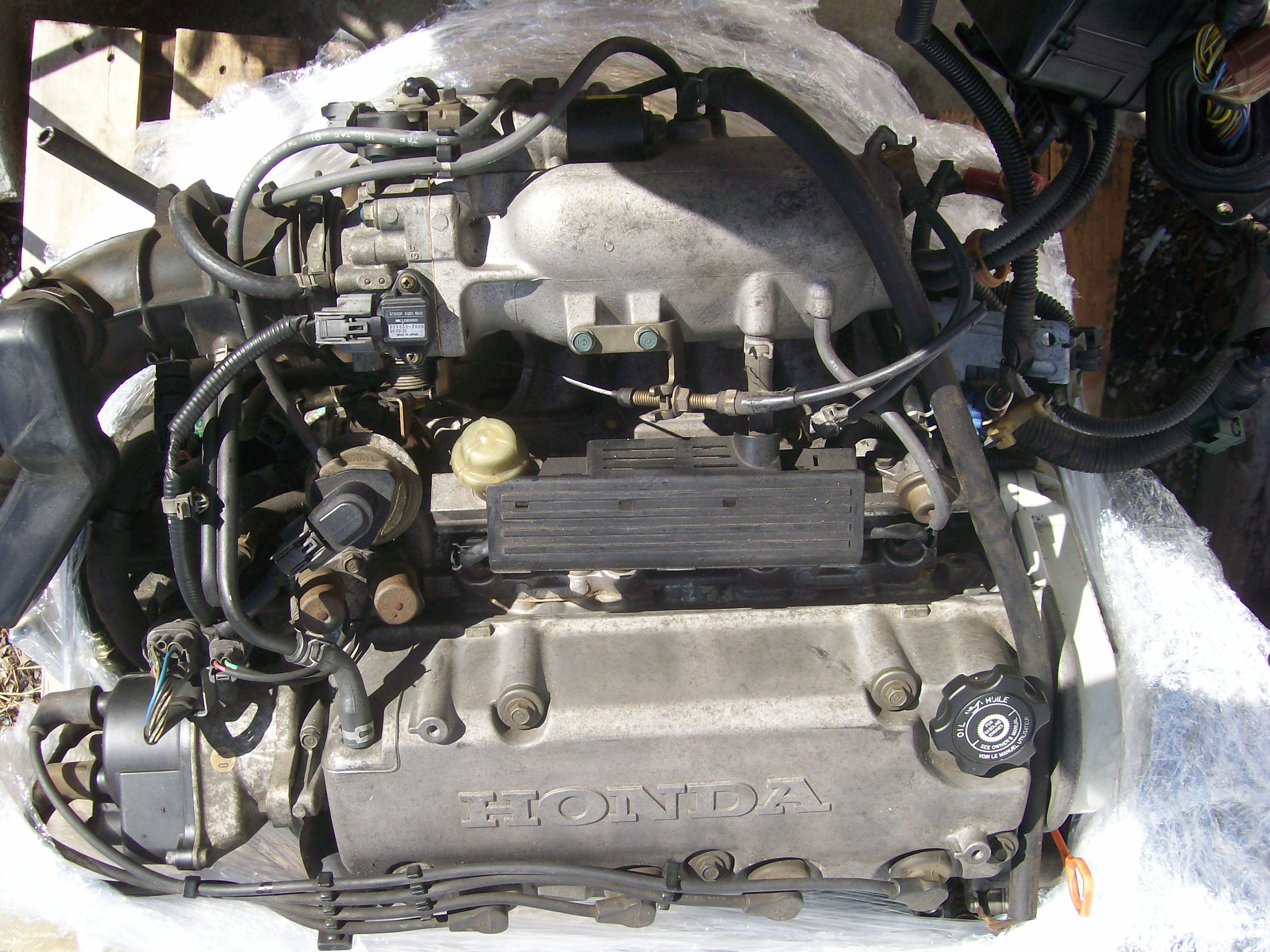
D15B Three-stage VTEC engine

- Found in:
  - 1995–1998 Honda Civic Ferio Vi (EK3, Japanese market)
  - 1999-2000 Honda Civic Vi-RS
  - 2001-2005 Honda Civic JDM VTEC (Japanese market, Europe)
    - Bore and Stroke: 75.0×84.5 mm
    - Displacement: 1,493 cc (91.1 cu in)
    - Rod Length: 137 mm
    - Rod/Stroke: 1.62
    - Compression: 9.6:1
    - Power: 130 PS (96 kW; 128 hp) at 7000 rpm
    - Torque: 139 N⋅m (103 lb⋅ft) at 5300 rpm
    - Redline : 7200 rpm
    - Valvetrain : SOHC VTEC + VTEC-E (three or four valves per cylinder)
    - Connecting rod length : 137 mm
    - Connecting rod big end diameter : 45 mm
    - Fuel Control : OBD2b
    - Head Code : P2J-07
    - ECU Code: P2J (small case ECU)*** AUTO CVT: P2J-J63*** MT P2J-003*** & ***MT P2J-J11***
    - Piston code : P2J

=== D15B1 ===
- Found in:
  - 1988–1991 Honda Civic Hatchback
    - Displacement: 1,493 cc (91.1 cu in)
    - Bore and Stroke: 75 mm × 84.5 mm (2.95 in × 3.33 in)
    - Compression: 9.2:1
    - Power: 70 hp (52.2 kW, 71.0 PS) at 5,500 rpm
    - Torque: 73 lb·ft (11.4 kgm, 112 Nm) at 3,000 rpm
    - Valvetrain: SOHC (4 valves per cylinder) non-VTEC
    - Head Code: PM3
    - Fuel System: Dual Point injection (PGM-FI)
    - ECU Code: PM9

=== D15B2 ===
- Found in:
  - 1988–1991 Honda Civic GL/DX/LX/CX (CX Canadian Market)
  - 1988–1991 Honda Civic Wagon Wagovan/DX
  - 1988–1991 Honda CRX DX
  - 1992–1995 Honda Civic LSi Hatch/Saloon (European Market)
  - 1992–1995 Honda Civic DXi Hatch/Saloon (European Market)
  - 1990–1995 Honda Concerto (European Market)
    - Displacement: 1,493 cc (91.1 cu in)
    - Bore and Stroke: 75 mm × 84.5 mm (2.95 in × 3.33 in)
    - Rod Length: 134 mm
    - Compression: 9.2:1
    - Power: 92 hp (69 kW) at 6,000 rpm (US)
      90 PS (66 kW) at 6,000 rpm (Europe)
    - Torque: 88 lb·ft (12.2 kg/m, 119 Nm) at 4,700 rpm
    - Valvetrain: SOHC (4 valves per cylinder) non-VTEC
    - Cam Gear: 38 tooth
    - Piston Code: PM3
    - Fuel Control: OBD-O DPFI
    - Redline: 6,500 rpm, 7,200 rpm rev limiter
    - Head Code: PM5
    - ECU Code: PM5/P04

=== D15B3 ===
- Found in:
  - 1988–1995 Honda Civic Shuttle GL
  - 1989–1996 Honda Ballade 150-16 & 150 (South Africa)
  - 1992–1995 Honda Civic LX (NZ model)
  - 1988–1991 Honda Civic LX/EX (NZ model)
  - 1992–1995 Honda Civic EX (SA model)
    - Displacement: 1,493 cc (91.1 cu in)
    - Bore and Stroke: 75 mm × 84.5 mm (2.95 in × 3.33 in)
    - Rod Length: 134 mm
    - Piston Code: PM3P
    - Compression: 9.2:1
    - Power: 77 kW (105 PS; 103 hp) at 6000 rpm
    - Torque: 89 lb·ft (13.55 kg/m, 121 Nm) at 4500 rpm
    - Redline: 6500 rpm
    - Valvetrain: SOHC (4 valves per cylinder)
    - Cam Gear: 38 tooth
    - Fuel Control: PGM-CARB
    - Transmission: S20

=== D15B4 ===
- Found in:
  - 1989–1993 Honda Civic GL (Australian Market)
    - Displacement: 1,493 cc (91.1 cu in)
    - Bore and Stroke: 75 mm × 84.5 mm (2.95 in × 3.33 in)
    - Compression: 9.2:1
    - Power: 74 kW (99 hp; 101 PS) at 5,200 rpm
    - Torque: 122 N⋅m (90 lb⋅ft) at 3,800 rpm
    - Valvetrain: SOHC (four valves per cylinder)
    - Fuel Control: Twin PGM-CARB with catalyst
    - Ignition Timing Control: Vacuum advance

=== D15B5 ===
- VTEC-E
- Found in:
  - 1992–1995 Honda Civic
    - Displacement: 1,493 cc (91.1 cu in)
    - Bore and Stroke: 75 mm × 84.5 mm (2.95 in × 3.33 in)
    - Valvetrain: SOHC VTEC (four valves per cylinder)
    - Rod Length: 137 mm
    - Head Code: P08
    - ECU Code: P08-030
    - Piston Code: P08-010
    - Piston Rod Code: PM6-000
    - Fuel Control: OBD-1 PGM-FI

=== D15B6 ===
- Found in:
  - 1988–1991 Honda CRX HF
    - Displacement: 1,493 cc (91.1 cu in)
    - Bore and Stroke: 75 mm × 84.5 mm (2.95 in × 3.33 in)
    - Compression: 9.1:1
    - Power:
    - 1988-1989: 62 hp (46 kW; 63 PS) at 4400 rpm
    - 1990-1991: 72 hp (54 kW; 73 PS) at 4500 rpm
    - Torque: 83 lb⋅ft (113 N⋅m) at 2200 rpm
    - Valvetrain: 8-Valve SOHC
    - Fuel Control: OBD-0 MPFI
    - Head Code: PM-8

=== D15B7 ===
  - 1992–1995 Honda Civic GLi (Australian model)
  - 1992–1995 Honda Civic DX/LX
  - 1992-1995 Honda Civic Cx (Canadian Market)
  - 1992–1995 Honda Civic LSi Coupé (European Market)
  - 1993–1995 Honda Civic Del Sol S
  - 1998-2000 Honda City SX8
    - Displacement: 1,493 cc (91.1 cu in)
    - Bore and Stroke: 75 mm × 84.5 mm (2.95 in × 3.33 in)
    - Compression: 9.2:1
    - Power: 102 hp (76.1 kW, 103 PS) at 5900 rpm
    - Torque: 98 lb·ft (13.5 kg/m, 133 Nm) at 5000 rpm
    - Valvetrain: 16-valve SOHC (four valves per cylinder)
    - Redline: 6500 rpm
    - Hardcut: 7000 rpm
    - Cam Gear: 38 tooth
    - Piston Code: PM3
    - Fuel Control: OBD-1 MPFI
    - ECU Code: P06
    - Head codes: PM 9–6, PM9–8

=== D15B8 ===
- Found in:
  - 1992–1995 Honda Civic CX (U.S. model)
    - Displacement: 1,493 cc (91.1 cu in)
    - Bore and Stroke: 75 mm × 84.5 mm (2.95 in × 3.33 in)
    - Compression: 9.1:1
    - Power: 70 hp (52.2 kW, 71.0 PS) at 4500 rpm
    - Torque: 83 lb·ft (11.5 kg/m, 113 Nm) at 2800 rpm
    - Valvetrain: 8-valve SOHC (two valves per cylinder)
    - Fuel cutoff: 5800 rpm
    - Cam Gear: 38 tooth
    - Fuel Control: OBD-1 MPFI
    - ECU Code: P05
    - Head codes: PM8-1, PM8-2

=== D15Y3 ===
- Found in:
  - 2001–2006 Civic EXi (Africa, Dubai, Pakistan)
    - Displacement: 1.5 L, 1,493 cc (91.1 cu in)
    - Bore and Stroke: 75.0 mm × 84.5 mm (3 in × 3 in)
    - Compression Ratio: 9.2:1
    - Power: 110 PS (81 kW; 108 hp) at 5800 rpm (Pakistan)
    - Torque: 135 N⋅m (100 lb⋅ft) at 4500 rpm
    - Redline Limiter: 6900 rpm
    - Valvetrain: SOHC, four valves per cylinder (non-VTEC)
    - Fuel Control: EFI PGM-FI (Programmed Fuel Injection) OBD-2.

=== D15Y4 ===
VTEC SOHC or non-VTEC

- Found in:
  - 2001–2006 Civic VTI (ES8) (VTEC) (Japan, Singapore, Malaysia, Sri Lanka)
  - 2001–2006 Civic EXi (ES8) (non-VTEC) (Japan, Singapore, Malaysia, Sri Lanka)
    - Displacement : 1,493 cc (91.1 cu in)
    - Bore and Stroke : 75.0 mm × 84.5 mm (3 in × 3 in)
    - Power: VTEC version 130 PS (96 kW; 128 hp) at 6400 rpm), non VTEC version 122 PS (90 kW; 120 hp) at 6400 rpm)
    - Torque : VTEC version 151 N⋅m (15.4 kg⋅m; 111.4 lb⋅ft)) at 5000 rpm, non-VTEC version 146 N⋅m (14.9 kg⋅m; 107.7 lb⋅ft)) at 4800 rpm
    - Valvetrain : SOHC four valves per cylinder (VTEC or non-VTEC)
    - Fuel Control : EFI PGM-FI (Programmed Fuel Injection) OBD-2

=== D15Z1 ===
- VTEC-E
- Found in:
  - 1992–1995 Honda Civic VX
  - 1992–1995 Honda Civic VEi (European Market)
    - Displacement : 1,493 cc (91.1 cu in)
    - Bore and Stroke : 75 mm × 84.5 mm (2.95 in × 3.33 in)
    - Rod Length : 137 mm
    - Rod/Stroke : 1.62
    - Compression : 9.3:1
    - Power : 90 hp (67.1 kW, 91.3 ps) at 5,600 rpm (92 hp at 5,500 rpm; USDM)
    - Torque : 98 lb·ft (13.5 kg/m, 133 Nm) at 4,800 rpm (97 lb·ft at 3,000 rpm; USDM)
    - Valvetrain : 12-/16-valve SOHC VTEC-E (USDM- Lean Burn Federal Emissions 49 State) (3-4 valves per cyl depending on engine speed)
    - VTEC Switchover : 2,500 rpm
    - Fuel Control : OBD-1 MPFI
    - ECU Code : P07
    - Head code: PO7-1

=== D15Z2 ===
- Found in:
  - 1993–1995 Honda Civic Breeze (AUDM)
    - Displacement : 1,493 cc (91.1 cu in)
    - Bore and Stroke : 75 mm × 84.5 mm (2.95 in × 3.33 in)
    - Rod Length : 137 mm
    - Rod/Stroke : 1.62
    - Compression : 9.2
    - Power : 89.8 hp (67 kW, 91.1 ps) at 6,000 rpm
    - Torque : 98 lb·ft (13.5 kg/m, 119 Nm) at 4,000 rpm
    - Valvetrain : SOHC (4 valves per cylinder)
    - Fuel Control : Twin carburetor PGM-CARB

=== D15Z3 ===
- VTEC-E
- Found in:
  - 1995–1997 Honda Civic MA9 (European Market)
    - Displacement : 1,493 cc (91.1 cu in)
    - Bore and Stroke : 75 mm × 84.5 mm (2.95 in × 3.33 in)
    - Rod Length : 137 mm
    - Rod/Stroke : 1.62
    - Compression : 9.3:1
    - Power : 90 hp (67.1 kW, 91.3 PS) at 5500 rpm
    - Torque : 98 lb·ft (13.5 kg/m, 133 Nm) at 4500 rpm
    - Valvetrain : SOHC VTEC-E (3-4 valves per cylinder depending on engine speed)
    - VTEC Switchover : 3,000 - 3,800 rpm (depending on engine load)
    - Fuel Control : OBD-1 MPFI
    - ECU code : P1G
    - Redline : 6,000 rpm
    - Fuel cutout : 6,300 rpm

=== D15Z4 ===
- Found in:
  - 1996–2000 Honda Ballade/Civic in South Africa & Venezuela
  - 1996–2000 Honda Civic LXi/EXi in the Philippines/Middle East/Trinidad & Tobago
    - Displacement : 1,493 cc (91.1 cu in)
    - Bore and Stroke : 75 mm × 84.5 mm (2.95 in × 3.33 in)
    - Power : 105 hp (78 kW) at 5,800 rpm
    - Torque : 103 lb⋅ft (140 N⋅m) at 4,200 rpm
    - Redline : 6,900 rpm
    - Rev-limiter: 7,400 rpm
    - Valvetrain : SOHC non-VTEC, four valves per cylinder
    - Piston code : P2CY
    - Head Code : P2A-9
    - Fuel Control : SFI (Sequential Fuel Injection)
    - Ecu Code : P2C/P2E

=== D15Z6 ===
- SOHC VTEC-E
- Found in:
  - 1995–2000 Honda Civic 1.5i LS (European Market)
    - Displacement : 1,493 cc (91.1 cu in)
    - Bore and Stroke : 75 mm × 84.5 mm (2.95 in × 3.33 in)
    - Rod Length : 137 mm
    - Compression : 9.6:1
    - Power : 114 PS (84 kW) at 6,500 rpm
    - Torque : 99 lb·ft (134 Nm) at 5,400 rpm
    - VTEC Switchover : depending on load, max ~3,500 rpm in 5th gear
    - Valvetrain : SOHC VTEC (3-4 valves per cylinder, depending on engine speed)
    - Fuel Control : OBD-2a PGM-FI MPFI
    - Ecu Code : P2Y
    - Head Code : P2J
    - Redline : 6,800 rpm
    - Fuel cutout : 7,200 rpm

=== D15Z7 ===
- Three-stage VTEC
- Found in:
  - 1996–1999 Honda Civic VTi EK3 and Ferio Vi
    - Displacement : 1,493 cc (91.1 cu in)
    - Piston Code: P2J
    - Bore and Stroke : 75 mm × 84.5 mm (2.95 in × 3.33 in)
    - Rod Length : 137 mm
    - Rod/Stroke : 1.62
    - Compression : 9.6:1
    - Power : 128 hp (95.4 kW, 130 ps) at 7000 rpm
    - Torque : 102 lb·ft (14.2 kg/m, 139 Nm) at 5300 rpm
    - Valvetrain : SOHC VTEC (3-4 valves per cylinder, depending on engine speed)
    - VTEC Switchover : 3200 and 5800 rpm
    - Fuel Control : OBD-2 MPFI
    - ECU Code : P2J
    - Manual Transmission ECU Codes : P2J-003 (OBD2a), P2J-J11 (OBD2b)
    - CVT Transmission ECU Codes : P2J-J61 (OBD2a), P2J-J71 (OBD2b)
    - Lean burn capable.

=== D15Z8 ===
- VTEC-E
- Found in:
  - 1997–2000 Honda Civic LS (MB3, MB9), (European Market)
    - Displacement : 1,493 cc (91.1 cu in)
    - Bore and Stroke : 75 mm × 84.5 mm (2.95 in × 3.33 in)
    - Rod Length : 137 mm
    - Deck Height : 207 mm
    - Compression : 9.6:1
    - Power : 114 hp (85.0 kW, 116 ps) at 6500 rpm
    - Torque : 95–99 lb·ft (13–14 kg/m, 128-134 Nm) at 4500 rpm
    - Head Code : P2J P2M
    - ECU Code : P9L
    - VTEC Switchover : 4000 rpm
    - Valvetrain : SOHC VTEC-E, 4 valves per cylinder

== D16 series engines (1.6 liter) ==
- Bore and Stroke: 75.0 mm × 90.0 mm (2.95 in × 3.54 in)
- Displacement: 1,590 cc (97 cu in)

=== D16A ===
- Found in:
  - 1997-1999 JDM Honda Domani (MB4)
    - Compression : 9.3:1
    - Power : 133 PS (98 kW; 131 hp) at 6600 rpm
    - Torque: 144 Nm
    - Redline : 7000 rpm
    - VTEC Engages : 4800 rpm
    - Valvetrain : SOHC (4 valves per cylinder)
    - Fuel Control : OBD2a
    - Head Code : P08
    - ECU Code: PBB-J61

=== D16A1 ===
- Found in:
  - 1986–89 Acura Integra (USA)
    - Valvetrain: DOHC 16-valve (four valves per cylinder)
    - Fuel Control :PGM-FI
    - 1986–1987: USDM Browntop
      - Compression: 9.3:1
      - Power: 113 hp (84 kW; 115 PS) at 6250 rpm
      - Torque: 13.7 kg⋅m (134 N⋅m; 99 lb⋅ft) at 5500 rpm
      - Piston Code: PG6B
      - ECU Code: PG7, Vacuum Advance Distributor
    - 1988–1989: USDM Blacktop
      - Compression: 9.5: 1
      - Power: 118 hp (88 kW; 120 PS) at 6500 rpm
      - Torque: 14.2 kg⋅m (139 N⋅m; 103 lb⋅ft) at 5500 rpm
      - Piston Code: P29
      - ECU Code: PG7, Electronic Advance Distributor

=== D16A3 ===
- Found in:
  - 1986–89 Honda Integra (Australia)
    - Compression : 9.5:1
    - Power: 88 kW (120 PS; 118 hp) at 5600 rpm
    - Torque: 140 Nm (14.3 kgm, 103 lbft) at 4800 rpm
    - Valvetrain: DOHC 16-valve, four valves per cylinder
    - Fuel Control: OBD-0 MPFI

=== D16A6 ===
Also known as D16Z2.

- non-VTEC
- Found in:
  - 1988–1991 Honda Civic Si, CRX Si, 90-91 Civic EX (4dr), Civic Wagon RT4WD (USDM)
  - 1988–1995 Honda Civic Shuttle RT4WD (UK/Europe/Asia/AU/NZ)
  - 1989–1996 Rover 216/416 GSi/Tourer (UK/Europe)
    - Rod Length: 137 mm
    - Rod Ratio: 1.52~
    - Compression: 9.1:1
    - Power: 108 hp (81 kW; 109 PS) at 5600 rpm
      - Note: 1988 engines were 105 hp (78 kW; 106 PS)
    - Torque: 100 lb⋅ft (136 N⋅m) at 4800 rpm
    - Redline: 6500 rpm (USA)
    - Rev limited to: 7200 rpm
    - Valvetrain: SOHC (4 valves per cylinder)
    - Cam Gear: 38 tooth
    - Fuel Control: OBD-0 MPFI
    - Head Code: PM3
    - ECU Code: PM6

=== D16A7 ===
(Basically a D16A6 without the catalytic converter)

- Found in:
  - 1988–1991 Civic 1.6i (GTi) in New Zealand
  - 1988–1989 Civic models in Europe (ED4, ED7)
  - 1995 Civic models in New Zealand (EG4)
  - 1988–1995 Models in South Africa
  - 1994 Civic GTi (New Zealand)
  - Ballade SH4 and SR4 (EE4 )
    - Rod Length : 137 mm
    - Compression : 9.6:1
    - Power : 117 hp (87 kW; 119 PS) at 5900 rpm
    - Torque : 13.9 kg⋅m (136 N⋅m; 101 lb⋅ft) at 4800 rpm
    - Valvetrain : SOHC, four valves per cylinder
    - ECU: PM6 (OBD-0) / P27 (OBD-1)?
    - Fuel Control : OBD-0 Multi-point PGM-FI, OBD-1 (NZDM)

=== D16A8 ===
- Found in:
  - 1988–1995 Civic/CRX/Concerto (UK/Europe/Australia)
  - 1992–1995 Rover 216/416 GTi (UK/Europe)
  - 1993–1997 Rover 216 Coupé (Europe)
    - Compression : 9.5:1
    - Power : 122 PS (90 kW; 120 hp) at 6800 rpm
    - Torque : 14.9 kg⋅m (146 N⋅m; 108 lb⋅ft) at 5900 rpm
    - Valvetrain : DOHC (4 valves per cylinder)
    - Fuel Control : OBD-0 and OBD-1 MPFI
    - ECU Code : PP5 (OBD-0), P28 (OBD-1)
    - Head Code : PM7
    - Gearbox : L3

=== D16A9 ===
(Same as D16A8 but without a catalytic converter)

- Found in:
  - 1988–1991 Concerto (UK/Europe)
  - 1988–1991 CRX 1.6i-16 (UK/Europe/South Africa)
  - 1990–1992 Ballade 160i-DOHC (South Africa)
  - 1988–1991 Civic 1.6i-16 (UK/Europe)
  - 1992–1993 Civic GTi (New Zealand)
  - 1989–1992 Rover 216/416 GTi (UK/Europe)
  - 1992–1995 Civic Si (Japanese, European venezuela and Peruvian version)
    - Compression : 9.5:1
    - Power : 125-129 hp (91.9-94.8 kW, 126-130 PS) at 6800 rpm
    - Torque : 105 lb·ft (14.5 kg/m, 143 Nm) at 5700 rpm
    - Valvetrain : DOHC 16 valve (4 valves per cylinder)
    - Redline: 7,200 rpm
    - Limit: 7,250 rpm
    - Fuel Cut: 7800 RPM (PM7)
    - Fuel Control : 88-91 OBD-0 MPFI (92-95 OBD-1)
    - ECU Code: (P29 OBD1)
    - Gearbox: non-LSD (1988-1991): L3, LSD (1992-1995): S20

=== D16B2 ===
- Found in:
  - 1998–2001 Honda Civic Aerodeck MC1 1.6i LS/ES/SR
  - 1997–2000 Rover 416 Si Automatic
    - Combustion Chamber Volume : 32.8 cc per cylinder
    - Power : 116 hp (85 kW)
    - Torque : 143 N⋅m (14.6 kg⋅m; 105 lb⋅ft) at ??? rpm
    - Valvetrain : SOHC 16 Valve
    - VTEC Switchover : Non-VTEC
    - Fuel Control : OBD2
    - ECU Code: ?

=== D16B5 ===
Largely identical to the D16Y5. The main differences are pistons, rods, camshaft, head gasket, intake manifold, and exhaust manifolds which are PDN rather than P2M.

- Found in:
  - 1998–2000 Honda Civic GX
    - Rod Length : 137 mm
    - Compression : 12.5:1
    - Combustion Chamber Volume : 32.8 cc per cylinder
    - Power: 106 PS (78 kW; 105 hp)
    - Torque:
    - Valvetrain : SOHC VTEC-E
    - VTEC Switchover :
    - Fuel Control : OBD-2 MPFI
    - ECU Code: PDN-A02

=== D16B6 ===
Differences to the D16B7 (also in Accords) are unknown

- Found in:
  - 1999 Honda Accord (CG7/CH5, Europe)
    - Power: 116 PS (85 kW) at 6400 rpm
    - Torque: 140 N⋅m (14 kg⋅m) at 5100 rpm
    - Valvetrain: SOHC, four valves per cylinder
    - Fuel control: PGM-FI
    - Firing order 1,4-2,3
    - ECU code: ??

=== D16V1 ===
- VTEC-E
- Found in:
  - 1999-2005 Honda Civic (European EM/EP2/ES/EU8)
    - Compression: 10.4:1
    - Power: 110 PS (81 kW) at 5600 rpm
    - Torque: 152 N⋅m (112 lb⋅ft) at 4300 rpm
    - Redline: 6250 rpm
    - Rev Limit: 6500 rpm
    - Valvetrain: SOHC, 4 valves per cylinder
    - Fuel control: Multi-point fuel injection, PGM-FI
    - Ignition timing: 8±2° BTDC at 700±50 rpm
    - Firing order: 1 - 3 - 4 - 2
    - ECU code: PMH

=== D16W1 ===
- non-VTEC non Civic
- Found in:
  - 1999–2006 Honda HRV
    - Power: 105 PS (77 kW) at 6200 rpm
    - Torque: 135 N⋅m (100 lb⋅ft) at 3400 rpm
    - Valvetrain: SOHC, four valves per cylinder
    - Fuel control: PGM-FI
    - ECU code :PEL

=== D16W2 ===
- Found in:
  - Honda HR-V
    - Power: 105 PS (77 kW)

=== D16W3 ===
- non-VTEC
- Found in:
  - 1998–2001 Honda Civic Aerodeck MC1 1.6i LS/SR
    - Power: 116 PS (85 kW; 114 hp)
    - Valvetrain : SOHC (4 valves per cylinder)

=== D16W4 ===
- VTEC
- Found in:
  - 1999–2000 Honda Civic MB4 1.6i VTEC/ES
  - 1998–2001 Honda Civic Aerodeck MC1 1.6i VTEC/ES
    - Power : 126 PS (93 kW; 124 hp) at 6600 rpm
    - Valvetrain : SOHC (4 valves per cylinder)
    - Redline: 6800 rpm
    - Rev Limit: 7200 rpm
    - Piston Code: P2P
    - ECU Code: PDT
    - Fuel Control: OBD2-b
    - VTEC switchover: 5500 rpm
    - Torque: 144 N⋅m (106 lb⋅ft) at 5500 rpm
    - Compression: 9.6:1

=== D16W5 ===
- VTEC
- Found in:
  - 2000–2006 Honda HRV
    - Redline: 6800 rpm
    - Rev Limit: 7000 rpm
    - Power : 124 PS (91 kW; 122 hp)
    - Valvetrain : SOHC (4 valves per cylinder)
    - Fuel Control: OBD-2
    - VTEC Switchover: 5200 rpm

=== D16W7 ===
- VTEC-E
- Found in:
  - 2004–2007 Honda Civic VTi / VTi-L (Asia)
    - Compression: 10.9:1
    - Power: 117 PS (86 kW; 115 hp) at 5600 rpm
    - Torque: 112 lb·ft (15.5 kg/m, 152 Nm) at 4300 rpm
    - Valvetrain: SOHC, four valves per cylinder
    - Redline: 6100 rpm
    - Limit: 6200 rpm
    - Fuel Control: OBD-1 MPFI
    - ECU Code: PM12
  - Also found in 2001–2005 Honda Civic ES (Europe, Turkey, Singapore)
  - Same as above, except:
  - Power: 110 PS (81 kW; 108 hp) at 5600 rpm
  - Torque: 152 N⋅m (112 lb⋅ft) at 4300 rpm
  - Redline: 6100 rpm
  - Limit: 6200 rpm

=== D16W9 ===
3-stage VTEC

- Found in :
  - 2001–2005 Honda Civic VTi (Philippines, Pakistan, Middle East)
    - Bore and Stroke:
    - Displacement:1.6L, 1,590 cc (97 cu in)
    - Compression Ratio: 10.5:1
    - Power: 132 PS (97 kW; 130 hp) at 6600 rpm
    - Torque: 154 N⋅m (114 lb⋅ft) at 5500 rpm
    - Redline Limiter: 7200 rpm
    - Valvetrain: SOHC VTEC3 (4 valves per cylinder)
    - 1st VTEC Switchover: 2500 rpm
    - 2nd VTEC Switchover: 5500 rpm
    - Fuel Control: EFI PGM-FI (Programmed Fuel Injection) OBD-2.

=== D16Y1 ===
- Found in :
  - 1992–1995 Honda Civic VTi (AUS)
    - Compression: 9.3:1
    - Power: 129 hp (96 kW; 131 PS) at 6600 rpm
    - Torque: 145 N⋅m (107 lb⋅ft) at 5200 rpm
    - Redline: 7200 rpm
    - Valvetrain: SOHC VTEC (4 valves per cylinder)
    - VTEC Switchover: 5000 rpm
    - Fuel Control: OBD-1 MPFI
    - Head Code: P08
    - ECU Code: P28

=== D16Y2 ===
- Found in :
  - 1995–1997 Honda Civic MB1 SR
    - Compression: 9.5:1
    - Power: 126 hp (94 kW) at 6500 rpm
    - Torque: 106 lb·ft (14.8 kg/m, 144 Nm) at 5200 rpm
    - Valvetrain: SOHC VTEC (four valves per cylinder)
    - Cylinder Head: P08
    - VTEC Switchover: 5500 rpm
    - Fuel Control: OBD-1 MPFI
    - ECU Code: P1H
    - Transmission: S20

=== D16Y3 ===
- Found in :
  - 1995–1997 Honda Civic MB1 LS (UK/Europe)
  - 1996–1997 Rover 416 SLI Auto (UK/Europe)
    - Compression: 9.4:1
    - Power: 83 kW (113 PS; 111 hp) at 5600 rpm
    - Torque: 140 N⋅m (103 lb⋅ft) at 5100 rpm
    - Redline: 7200 rpm
    - Valvetrain: SOHC (four valves per cylinder)
    - Fuel Control: OBD-1 MPFI

The camshaft is the same as D16A6

=== D16Y4 ===
- Found in:
  - 1998–2000 Civic 1.6 iES (Turkey)
  - 1996–2000 Civic CXi, GL, GLi (New Zealand, Australia)
    - Compression: 9.4:1
    - Power: 120 PS (88 kW) at 6400 rpm
    - Torque: 144 N⋅m (106 lb⋅ft) at 5000 rpm
    - Redline: 6800 rpm
    - Rev-limiter: 7200 rpm
    - Fuel Control: OBD-2 MPFI
    - Head Code: P2A-2
    - ECU Code: P2K
    - Rod /Stroke Ratio: 1.52
    - Rod Length: 152 mm
    - Deck Height: 212

=== D16Y5 ===
- VTEC-E
- Found in :
  - 1996–2000 Honda Civic HX
  - 1996 Honda Civic EX (sedan Peruvian version)
    - Rod Length: 137 mm
    - Rod/Stroke: 1.52
    - Compression: 9.4:1
    - Power: 115 hp (86 kW; 117 PS) at 5600 rpm
    - Torque: 104 lb⋅ft (141 N⋅m) at 4500 rpm
    - Valvetrain: SOHC VTEC-E (4 valves per cylinder)
    - Fuel Control: OBD-2 MPFI
    - Head Code: P2J
  - 1996–2000 Honda Civic VTI sedan (Australia)
    - Compression: 9.3:1
    - Power: 88 kW (120 PS) at 5800 rpm
    - Torque: 145 N⋅m (107 lb⋅ft) at 5200 rpm
    - Valvetrain: SOHC VTEC-E (4 valves per cylinder)
    - Fuel Control: OBD-2 MPFI
    - Head Code: P2J
    - ECU Code: P2N
    - Piston Code : P2MY
    - Redline : 7200

=== D16Y7 ===
- Found in:
  - 1996–2000 Honda Civic DX/VP/LX/CX
  - 1998–2000 Honda Civic Special Edition – SE/EX (Canada)
  - 1996–1997 Honda Del Sol S
  - 1996–1997 Honda Civic Coupé LSI
    - Compression: 9.4:1
    - Power: 106 hp (79 kW; 107 PS) at 6200 rpm
    - Torque: 103 lb·ft (140 N^{.}m) at 4600 rpm
    - Redline: 6800 rpm
    - Rev-limiter: 7200 rpm
    - Valvetrain: SOHC (4 valves per cylinder)
    - Fuel Control: OBD2 MPFI
    - Head Code: P2A-2
    - Piston Code: P2E
    - ECU Code: P2E

=== D16Y8 ===
16-Valve, SOHC VTEC Also available in New Zealand and Pakistan under the code D16Y6

- Found in:
  - 1996–1997 Honda Del Sol Si (US)
  - 1996–2000 Honda Civic EX (US, UK)
  - 1996-2000 Honda Civic EG/EK (Europe)
  - 1996-1998 Honda Civic Coupe (UK)
  - 1996–2000 Honda Civic Si (Canada)
  - 1997-2000 Acura 1.6 EL (Canada)
  - 1996-2000 Honda Civic Sedan VTi (Thailand)
    - Redline: 6800 rpm
    - Rev Limit: 7200 rpm
    - ECU Code: P2P
    - Piston Code: P2P
    - Fuel Control: OBD2-b
    - VTEC switchover: 5,600 rpm
    - Power: 127 hp (95 kW) at 6600 rpm
    - Torque: 107 lb⋅ft (145 N⋅m) at 5500 rpm
    - Compression: 9.6:1
    - Deck Height: 8.347 inches
    - Rod Length: 5.394 inches

=== D16Y9 ===
equal to D16Y4 non VTEC

- Found in:
  - 1996–2000 Honda Ballade/Civic in South Africa and Venezuela
    - Power: 79 kW (107 PS; 106 hp) at 5900 rpm (AT: 110 PS (81 kW; 108 hp) at 5500 rpm)
    - Torque: 108 lb·ft (14.9 kg/m, 146 Nm) at 4000 rpm
    - Valvetrain: SOHC (4 valves per cylinder)
    - Fuel Control: OBD2A MPFI
    - Redline: 7200 rpm
    - Rev-limiter: 7400 rpm
    - Valvetrain: SOHC (4 valves per cylinder)
    - Head Code: P2A-9
    - Piston Code: P2K
    - ECU Code: P2K 2 connectors
  - The D16Y9 in South Africa has different power figures:
    - Power: 89 kW (121 PS; 119 hp) at 6400 rpm
    - Torque: 146 Nm (108 lbf-ft) at 5500 rpm
      - Information found in April 1998 CAR Magazine (SA)

=== D16Z5 ===
(Basically the same engine as the D16A9, but now with a catalytic converter and lambda sensor)

- Found in:
  - September 1989 – 1992 Honda CRX (European market)
    - Compression: 9.5:1
    - Power: 124 PS (91 kW; 122 hp) at 6800 rpm
    - Torque: 14.3 kg⋅m (140 N⋅m; 103 lb⋅ft) at 5700 rpm
    - Valvetrain: DOHC, four valves per cylinder
    - Cam Gear: 34 tooth
    - Fuel Control: OBD-0 PGM-FI
    - Head Code: P7
    - Piston Code: PM7
    - ECU Code: PM7
    - Clutch Kit: 210 mm disk

=== D16Z6 ===
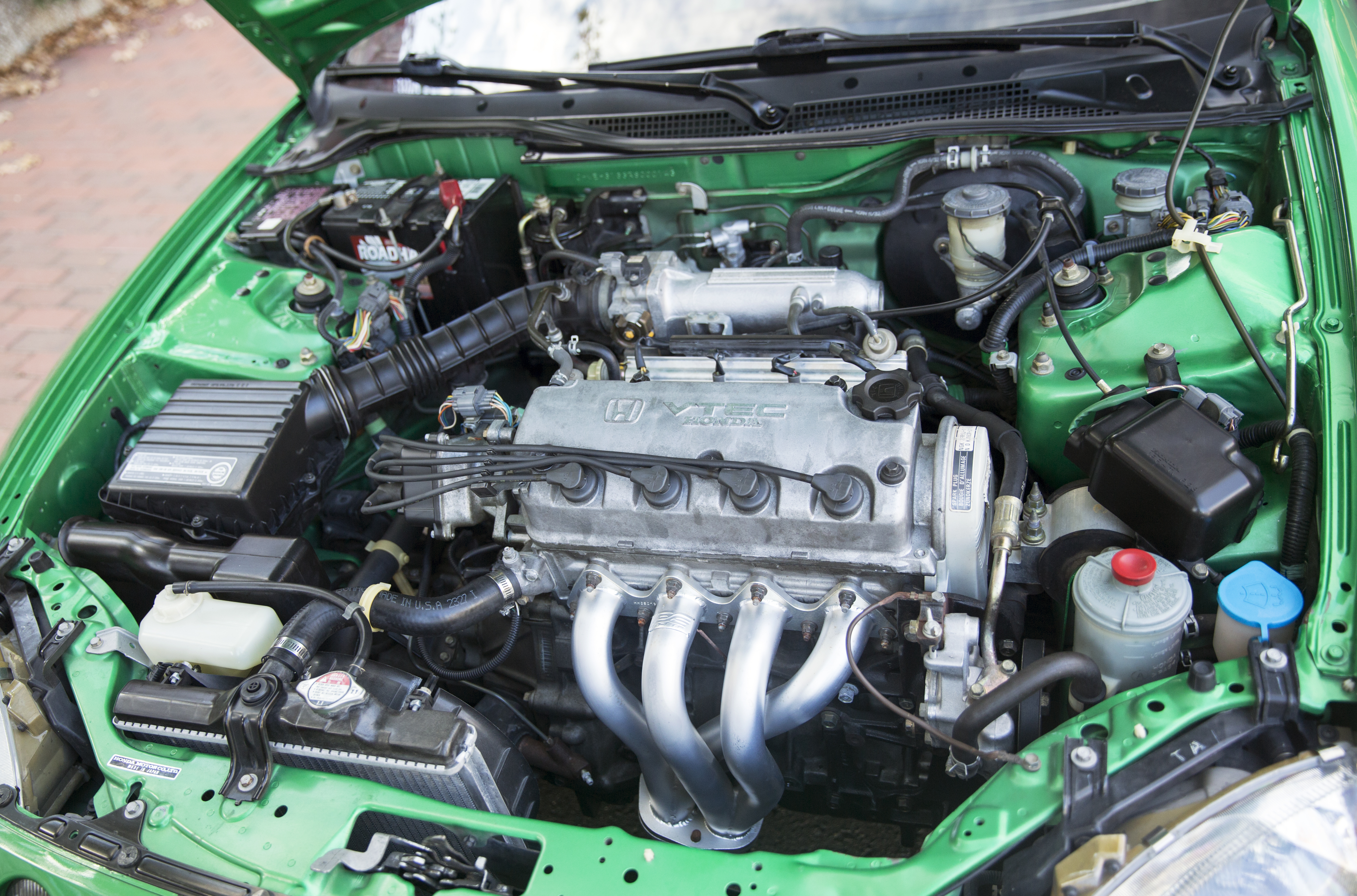
The D16Z6 engine in a 1994 Honda del Sol.

VTEC

- Found in
  - 1992-1995 Honda Civic Si (US)
  - 1992–1995 Honda Civic EX, EX-V
  - 1992–1995 Honda Civic ESi (European Market)
  - 1993–1995 Honda Del Sol Si (US)
  - 1993–1996 Honda Del Sol ESi (European)
    - Rod Length: 137 mm
    - Rod Ratio: 1.52~
    - Compression: 9.2:1
    - Power: 125 hp (93 kW; 127 PS) at 6600 rpm
    - Torque: 106 lb·ft (14.7 kg/m, 144 Nm) at 5200 rpm
    - Volumetric Efficiency: 87.69%
    - Redline: 7200 rpm
    - Fuel cut: over 7400 rpm
    - VTEC switchover: 4800 rpm
    - Fuel control: OBD-1 PGM-FI
    - Head code: P08
    - ECU code: P28

=== D16Z7 ===
VTEC

- Found in
  - 1996–2000 Honda Civic EX Coupé
  - 1994 Honda Civic Rtsi 4wd
    - Rod Length: 137 mm
    - Rod Ratio: 1.52~
    - Compression: 9.6:1
    - Power: 127 bhp at 6600 rpm
    - Torque: 107 lb·ft at 5500 rpm
    - Redline: 7200 rpm

=== D16Z9 ===
VTEC

- Found in:
  - 1994–1995 Civic Coupé (EJ1) 1.6i ESi European
  - 1994–1995 Civic Sedan (EH5) 1.6i EX US
    - Compression: 9.3:1
    - Power: 97 kW (132 PS; 130 hp) at 6600 rpm
    - Torque: 106 lbf (144 Nm) at 5200 rpm
    - VTEC switchover: 4,800 rpm
    - Redline: 7200 rpm
    - Fuel cut: 7500 rpm
    - Valvetrain: SOHC VTEC (4 valves per cylinder)
    - Fuel control: OBD-1 MPFI
    - ECU code: P28

== ZC ==
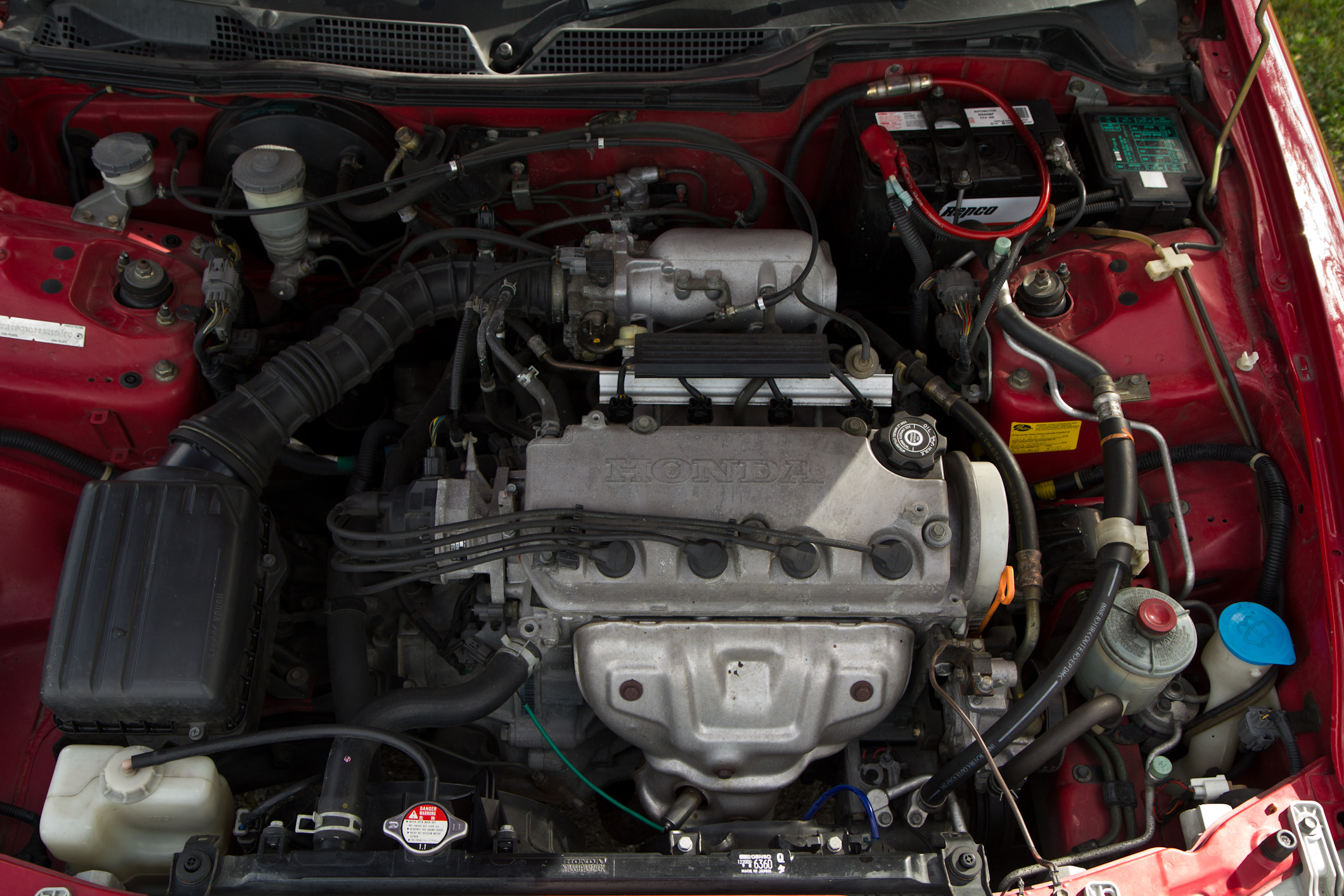
A Honda non-VTEC SOHC ZC 1.6 engine in a 1996 third generation (DC1) JDM Integra.

A few D-series variants are labelled (Japanese: Honda ZC engine) (usually JDM), but they are not truly a different series. They are similar to the D16Y4, D16A8, D16Z6, D16A1, D16A3, D16A6, D16A9 and D16Z5 engines.

There are both SOHC and DOHC ZC engines. The non-VTEC SOHC ZC is similar to the D16A6 ('91–'96) and D16Y4 ('96–2000) engine, but with more aggressive cam timing. The SOHC VTEC ZC is similar to the D16Z6 ('91–'96). The DOHC ZC is similar to the D16A1, D16A3, D16A8, D16A9 and D16Z5 engines.

=== SOHC ZC VTEC ===
VTEC

- Found in
  - 1991–1993 Honda Civic Ferio EJ3 (JDM)
  - 1992–1995 Honda Civic EJ1 (JDM)
  - 1992–1995 Honda Domani MA4 (JDM)
    - Displacement : 1590 cc (97 cu in)
    - Bore and Stroke : 75 mm × 90 mm (3.0 in × 3.5 in)
    - Rod Length : 137MM
    - Rod/Stroke : 1.52
    - Compression : 9.2:1
    - Power : 130 PS (96 kW; 128 hp) at 6600 rpm
    - Torque : 14.8 kg⋅m (145 N⋅m; 107 lb⋅ft) at 5200 rpm
    - Redline : 7200 rpm
    - Fuel Cut : 7300 rpm
    - VTEC Switchover : 5500 rpm
    - Fuel Control : OBD-1 MPFI
    - ECU Code : P70 (Domani), P91 (Civic Coupé), P29

=== DOHC ZC ===
Non-VTEC

- Found in
  - 1984–1987 Honda Ballade CRX AS
  - 1984–1987 Honda Civic AT
  - 1985–1987 Honda Integra AV/DA1 (Lower trim packages equipped with Single Carburetor)
  - 1986–1991 Honda CRX EF7 ED9
  - 1992–1995 Honda Civic EH1
    - Displacement : 1590 cc
    - Bore and Stroke : 75 mm X 90 mm
    - 1984–1987 Compression : 9.3:1 1988–1989 Compression : 9.5: 1
    - Single Carburetor : 100 PS (73.5 kW) at 6800 rpm; Torque : 92 lb·ft (12.8 kg/m, 126 Nm) at 5500 rpm
    - 1984–1987 Power : 115 PS (85 kW) at 6250 rpm; Torque : 99 lb·ft (13.7 kg/m, 134 Nm) at 5500 rpm
    - 1988–1989 Power : 120 PS (88 kW) at 6500 rpm; Torque : 103 lb·ft (14.0 kg/m, 137 Nm) at 5500 rpm
    - 1988–1991 Power : 130 PS (96 kW) at 6800 rpm; Torque : 106 lb·ft (14.7 kg/m, 144 Nm) at 5700 rpm
    - Valvetrain : DOHC
    - Piston Code 1986-'87 : PG6
    - Piston Code 1988-'89 : PM7
    - Fuel Control : OBD-0 MPFI
    - Ecu Code : OBD-0 PM7, OBD-1 P28

Euro Mk1 ('85-'87) 1.6 CRX's are fitted with an engine designated "ZC1" which is a higher spec 125 PS (92 kW) version of the D16A1. These were later replaced by the D16A8 or B16A, depending on the specs.

1st Gen ZC Identified by: External coil, small distributor, dual butterfly TB, cam cover bolts on top, brown/gold cam cover. Large cam pulleys. +3cc PG6B pistons, non-pent roof combustion chamber. As a ZC it appeared in JDM AV Integra Si and JDM E-AT Civic/CR-X Si. Commonly produced at the time but now over twenty years old and getting harder to find. D-series version is called D16A1, 1986–1987.

2nd Gen ZC (rarest) Identified by: Internal coil, large distributor, single butterfly TB mounted on slight angle forward, bolts on top of cam cover, black cam cover, large cam pulleys. +7cc PM7 pistons, 43 cc Pent roof combustion chamber. As a ZC appeared in JDM facelift AV bodied Integra Si did not appear in Civic or CR-X, rarest ZC only produced for less than one year. D-series version D16A1 '88-'89 (sometimes +7cc P29 pistons)

3rd Gen ZC Identified by: Internal coil, large distributor, single butterfly TB. Black cam cover. Cam cover bolts on the sides. Small cam pulleys. Inlet Manifold stamped PM7. +7cc PM7 pistons, 43 cc Pent roof combustion chamber. As a "ZC" this appeared in the JDM EF3 Civic and EF7 CR-X, and also in the JDM Honda Quint Integra GSi (DA1 chassis). This is the most commonly produced ZC, manufactured in Japan from end of '87 through to early '91 D-series version D16A8/9 (Euro Civic Si) (sometimes +7cc P29 pistons)

4th Gen ZC Identified by: Internal coil. OBD1 EFi system (grey plug). No cam angle sensor on exhaust cam, now located in distributor. Rubber plug where cam angle sensor would mount. Black cam cover. No PGM-EFi plate on the inlet manifold, replaced with three ribs instead. P29 stamped on inlet manifold. MAP sensor on TB. +7cc PM7 pistons, pent roof combustion chamber. As a ZC only appeared in EG5 Civic bodies, no Integra or CRX received this engine. Reasonably common produced from '92 to '94. (20th Anniversary edition & Japanese car of the year) D-series version D16A8/9 (Euro & Australia Civic Si) (sometimes +7cc P29 pistons) Hond

== D17 series engines (1.7 liter) ==
=== D17A ===
- Found in:
  - 2001–2005 Honda Civic (Japan)
    - Displacement : 1,668 cc (101.8 cu in)
    - Bore and Stroke: 75 × 94.4 mm (3.0 × 3.72 in)
    - Compression : 10.5:1
    - Power : (lean burn) 120 PS (88 kW; 118 hp) at 4900 rpm; 140 PS (103 kW; 138 hp) at 6750 rpm
    - Torque : 160 N⋅m (118 lb⋅ft) at 4800 rpm
    - Rev-limiter : 7200 rpm
    - Valvetrain : SOHC (4 valves per cylinder)
    - Fuel Control : OBD-2 MPFI

ECU 37820 PLR J01-13 (manual transmission) VTEC Switchover: 3900 rpm (manual transmission)

=== D17A1 ===
- Found in:
  - 2001–2005 Honda Civic DX/LX/VP
    - Displacement : 1,668 cc (101.8 cu in)
    - Bore and Stroke : 75 mm × 94.4 mm (2.95 in × 3.72 in)
    - Compression : 9.5:1
    - Power : 122 hp (91 kW; 124 PS) at 6400 rpm
    - Torque : 110 lb⋅ft (149 N⋅m) at 4500 rpm
    - RPM redline: 6750 rpm
    - Rev-limiter : 7200 rpm
    - Valvetrain : SOHC (4 valves per cylinder)
    - Fuel Control : OBD-2 MPFI

=== D17A2 ===
- VTEC
- Found in:
  - 2001–2005 Honda Civic EX (US only)
  - 2001–2005 Honda Civic LX (Europe)
  - 2001–2005 Honda Civic Si (Canada only)
  - 2001–2005 Acura 1.7 EL (Canada only)
  - 2000–2007 Honda Stream 1.7 (Japan)
  - 2004-2007 Honda FR-V 1.7 (Europe)
    - Displacement: 1,668 cc (101.8 cu in)
    - Bore and Stroke: 75 mm × 94.4 mm (2.95 in × 3.72 in)
    - Rod Length: 137 mm
    - Rod/Stroke: 1.45
    - Compression: 9.9:1
    - Power (North America): 127 hp (95 kW; 129 PS) at 6,300 rpm
      Japan: 125 PS (92 kW; 123 hp) at 6,300 rpm
    - Torque (North America): 114 lb⋅ft (155 N⋅m) at 4,800
      Japan: 154 N⋅m (114 lb⋅ft) at 4,800 rpm
    - RPM redline: 6,800 rpm
    - Rev-limiter: 7,200 rpm
    - Valvetrain: SOHC VTEC, four valves per cylinder
    - VTEC Switchover: 3,200 rpm
    - Fuel Control: OBD-2 MPFI

=== D17A5 ===
- VTEC-E
- Found in:
  - 2001–2005 Honda Civic 170i VTEC (South Africa)
  - 2004 Honda Stream VTEC (Indonesia)
    - Displacement : 1,668 cc (101.8 cu in)
    - Bore and Stroke : 75 mm × 94.4 mm (2.95 in × 3.72 in)
    - Compression : 9.9:1
    - Power : 130 hp (97 kW; 132 PS) at 6,300 rpm
    - Torque : 155 N⋅m (114 lb⋅ft) at 4,800 rpm
    - Valvetrain : SOHC VTEC-E Lean Burn (4 valves per cylinder)
    - VTEC Switchover : 3,200 rpm
    - Fuel Control : OBD-2 MPFI

=== D17A6 ===
- VTEC-E
- Found in:
  - 2001–2005 Honda Civic HX
    - Displacement : 1,668 cc (101.8 cu in)
    - Bore and Stroke : 75 mm × 94.4 mm (2.95 in × 3.72 in)
    - Compression : 9.9:1
    - Power : 117 hp (87 kW; 119 PS) at 6,100 rpm
    - Torque : 111 lb⋅ft (150 N⋅m) at 4,500 rpm
    - Valvetrain : SOHC VTEC-E Lean Burn (4 valves per cylinder)
    - VTEC Switchover : 2,300 rpm
    - Fuel Control : OBD-2 MPFI

=== D17A7 ===
- Found in:
  - 2001–2005 Honda Civic GX
  - Fuel CNG (Compressed Natural Gas)
    - Displacement : 1,668 cc (101.8 cu in)
    - Bore and Stroke : 75 mm × 94.4 mm (2.95 in × 3.72 in)
    - Compression : 12.5:1
    - Power : 100 hp (75 kW; 101 PS) at 6,100 rpm
    - Torque : 98 lb·ft (13.5 kg/m, 133 Nm) at 4,000 rpm
    - Valvetrain : SOHC (4 valves per cylinder)
    - Fuel Control : OBD-2 MPFI

=== D17A8 ===
- Found in:
  - 2001-2005 Honda Civic Coupé LS (Europe)
    - Displacement : 1,668 cc (101.8 cu in)
    - Bore and Stroke : 75 mm × 94.4 mm (2.95 in × 3.72 in)
    - Compression : 9.9:1
    - Power : 85.8 kW (117 PS; 115 hp) at 6100 rpm
    - Torque : 110 lb·ft (15.2 kg/m, 149 Nm) at 4500 rpm
    - RPM redline : 6750 rpm
    - Rev-limiter : 7200 rpm
    - Valvetrain : SOHC (4 valves per cylinder)
    - Fuel Control : OBD-2 MPFI

=== D17A9 ===
- VTEC-E
- Found in:
  - 2001–2005 Honda Civic Coupe ES (Europe)
    - Displacement : 1,668 cc (101.8 cu in)
    - Bore and Stroke : 75 mm × 94.4 mm (2.95 in × 3.72 in)
    - Rod Length : 140 mm
    - Rod/Stroke : 1.48
    - Compression : 9.9:1
    - Power : 125 PS (92 kW; 123 hp) at 6,300 rpm
    - Torque : 145 N⋅m (107 lb⋅ft) at 4,800 rpm
    - RPM redline: 6,800 rpm
    - Rev-limiter: 7,200 rpm
    - Valvetrain: SOHC VTEC-E, four valves per cylinder
    - VTEC Switchover: 2,500 - 3,200 rpm
    - Fuel Control: OBD-2 MPFI

=== D17Z3 ===
- VTEC
- Found in:
  - 2001–2006 Honda Civic EX (Brazil only)
  - 2005–2006 Honda Civic LXL (Brazil only)
    - Displacement: 1,668 cc (101.8 cu in)
    - Bore and Stroke: 75 mm × 94.4 mm (2.95 in × 3.72 in)
    - Rod Length: 140 mm
    - Rod/Stroke: 1.48
    - Compression: 9.9:1
    - Power: 130 PS (96 kW; 128 hp) at 6,300 rpm
    - Torque: 114 lb·ft (15.8 kg/m, 154 Nm) at 4,800 rpm
    - RPM redline: 6,800 rpm
    - Rev-limiter: 7,000 rpm
    - Valvetrain: SOHC VTEC, four valves per cylinder
    - VTEC Switchover: 4,800 rpm
    - Fuel Control: OBD-2 MPFI

=== D17Z2 ===
- SOHC
- Found in:
  - 2001–2006 Honda Civic LX (Brazil only)
  - 2004 Honda Civic LXL (Brazil only)
    - Displacement: 1,668 cc (101.8 cu in)
    - Bore and Stroke: 75 mm × 94.4 mm (2.95 in × 3.72 in)
    - Rod Length: 140 mm
    - Rod/Stroke: 1.48
    - Compression: 9.9:1
    - Power: 115 PS (85 kW; 113 hp) at 6,300 rpm
    - RPM redline: 6,800 rpm
    - Rev-limiter: 7,000 rpm
    - Valvetrain: SOHC, four valves per cylinder
    - Fuel Control: OBD-2 MPFI
