= VTEC =

Automobile variable valve timing technology

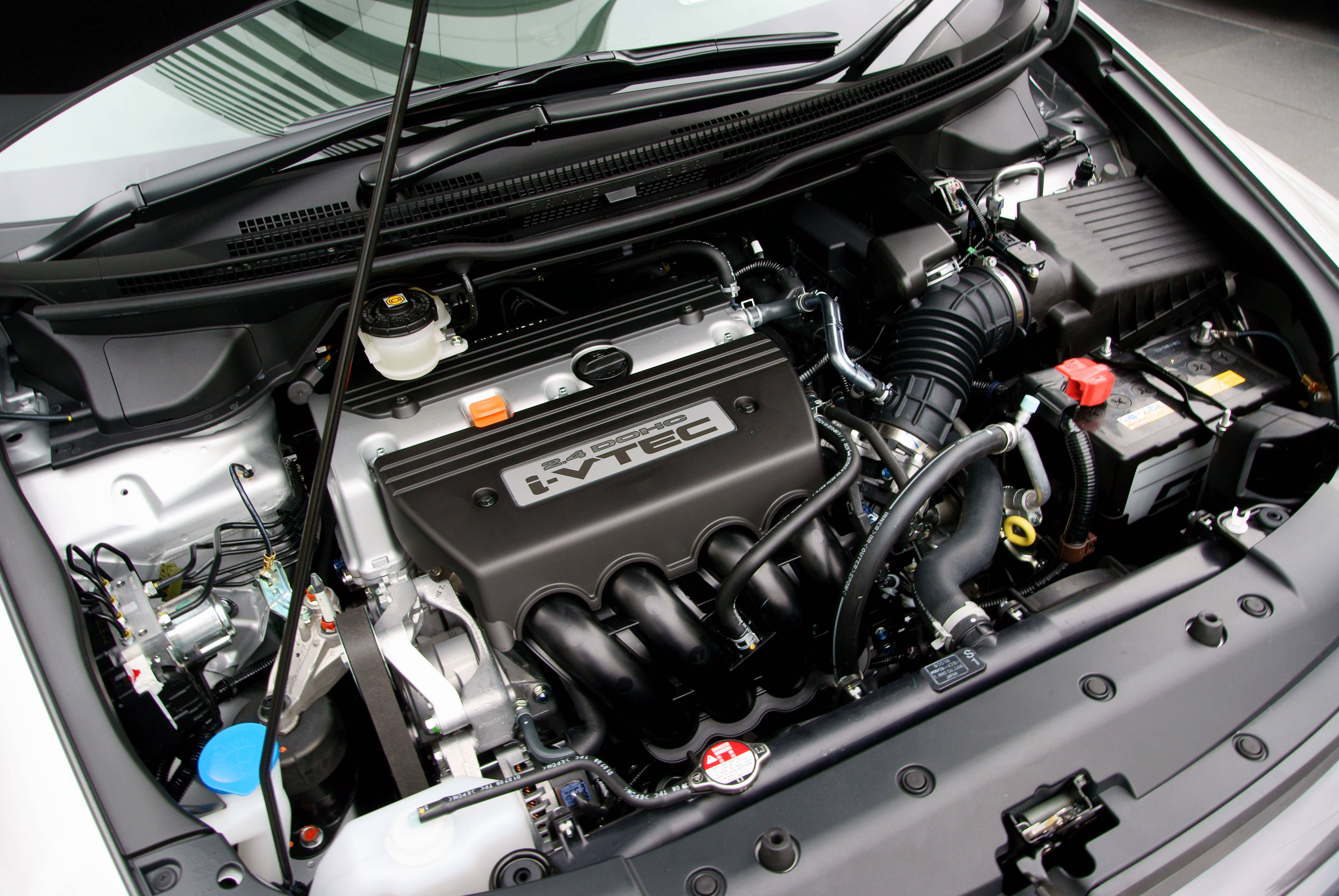
A Honda K24A Engine with i-VTEC

VTEC engaging in the F23A7 Inline-four

Variable Valve Timing & Lift Electronic Control (VTEC) is a valve system developed by Honda to improve the volumetric efficiency of a four-stroke internal combustion engine, resulting in higher performance at high rpm, and lower fuel consumption at low rpm. VTEC uses two (or occasionally three) camshaft profiles and hydraulically selects between profiles. It was invented by Honda engineer Ikuo Kajitani. It is distinctly different from standard VVT (variable valve timing) systems which change only the valve timings and do not change the camshaft profile or valve lift in any way.

== Context and description ==
Japan levies a tax based on engine displacement, and Japanese auto manufacturers have correspondingly focused their research and development efforts on improving the performance of their smaller engine designs. One method for increasing performance into a static displacement includes forced induction, as with models such as the Toyota Supra and Nissan 300ZX, which used turbocharger applications, and the Toyota MR2, which used a supercharger for some model years. Another approach is the rotary engine used in the Mazda RX-7 and RX-8. A third option is to change the cam timing profile, of which Honda’s VTEC system was the first production engine to use cam‑switching technology to vary both valve timing and lift.

The VTEC system provides the engine with valve timing optimized for both low and high speed operations. In basic form, the single cam lobe and follower/rocker arm of a conventional engine is replaced with a locking multi-part rocker arm and two cam profiles: one optimized for low-rpm stability and fuel efficiency, and the other designed to maximize high-rpm power output. The switching operation between the two cam lobes is controlled by the ECU, which takes account of engine oil pressure, engine temperature, vehicle speed, engine speed, and throttle position. Using these inputs, the ECU is programmed to switch from the low-lift to the high-lift cam lobes when certain conditions are met. At the switch point, a solenoid is actuated that allows oil pressure from a spool valve to operate a locking pin, which binds the high-rpm rocker arm to the low-rpm ones. From this point on, the valves open and close according to the high-lift profile, which opens the valve further and for a longer time. The switch-over point is variable, between a minimum and maximum point, and is determined by engine load. The switch back from high- to low-rpm cams is set to occur at a lower engine speed than the switch up (representing a hysteretic cycle) to avoid a situation in which the engine is asked to operate continuously at or around the switch-over point.

The older approach to timing adjustments is to produce a camshaft with a valve timing profile that is better suited to low-speed operation. The improvements in low-speed performance, which is where most street-driven automobiles operate a majority of the time, occur in trade for a power and efficiency loss at higher-rpm ranges. VTEC attempts to combine low-rpm fuel efficiency and stability with high-rpm performance.

== History ==
VTEC, the original Honda variable valve control system, originated from REV (Revolution-Modulated Valve Control) introduced on the CBR400 in 1983, known as HYPER VTEC. In the regular four-stroke automobile engine, the intake and exhaust valves are actuated by lobes on a camshaft. The shape of the lobes determines the timing, lift and duration of each valve: timing refers to an angular measurement of when a valve is opened or closed with respect to the piston position (BTDC or ATDC); lift refers to how much the valve is opened; duration refers to how long the valve is kept open. Owing to the behavior of the working fluid (the air and fuel mixture) before and after combustion — which imposes physical limitations on the flow, as well as the interaction with the ignition spark — the optimal valve timing, lift and duration settings under low speed engine operations are very different from those under high speed. Optimal low speed valve timing, lift and duration settings would result in insufficient filling of the cylinder with fuel and air at high speed, thus greatly limiting engine power output. Conversely, optimal high speed valve timing, lift and duration settings would result in very rough low speed operation and difficult idling. The ideal engine would have fully variable valve timing, lift and duration, in which the valves would always open at exactly the right point, lift high enough, and stay open just the right amount of time for the engine speed and load in use.

=== DOHC VTEC ===
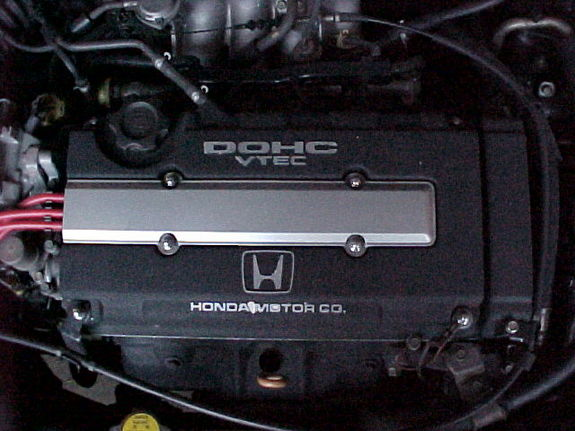
VTEC debuted in the B16A engine of the 1989 Honda Integra XSi.

VTEC was introduced as a DOHC (dual overhead camshaft) system in Japan in the 1989 Honda Integra XSi, which used the 160 bhp (120 kW) B16A engine. The same year, Europe saw the arrival of VTEC in the Honda Civic and Honda CRX 1.6i-VT, using a 150 bhp (110 kW) B16A1 variant. The United States market saw its first VTEC system with the introduction of the 1991 Acura NSX, which used a 3-litre DOHC C30A V6 with 270 bhp (200 kW). DOHC VTEC engines soon appeared in other vehicles, such as the 1992 Acura Integra GS-R (160 bhp (120 kW)B17A1), and later in the 1993 Honda Prelude VTEC (195 bhp (145 kW) H22A) and Honda del Sol VTEC (160 bhp (120 kW) B16A3). The Integra Type R (1995–2000) available in the Japanese market produces 197 bhp (147 kW; 200 PS) using a B18C 1.8-litre engine, producing more horsepower per litre than most super-cars at the time. Honda has also continued to develop other varieties and today offers several varieties of VTEC, such as i-VTEC and i-VTEC Hybrid.

=== SOHC VTEC valvetrain ===
Honda also applied the system to SOHC (single overhead camshaft) engines such as the D-Series and J-Series Engines, which share a common camshaft for both intake and exhaust valves. The trade-off was that Honda's SOHC engines benefited from the VTEC mechanism only on the intake valves. This is because VTEC requires a third center rocker arm and cam lobe (for each intake and exhaust side), and, in the SOHC engine, the spark plugs are situated between the two exhaust rocker arms, leaving no room for the VTEC rocker arm. Additionally, the center lobe on the camshaft cannot be utilized by both the intake and the exhaust, limiting the VTEC feature to one side.

However, beginning with the J37A2 3.7L SOHC V6 engine introduced on all 2009–2012 Acura RL SH-AWD models, SOHC VTEC was incorporated for use with intake and exhaust valves, using a total of six cam lobes and six rocker arms per cylinder. The intake and exhaust rocker shafts contain primary and secondary intake and exhaust rocker arms, respectively. The primary rocker arm contains the VTEC switching piston, while the secondary rocker arm contains the return spring. The term "primary" does not refer to which rocker arm forces the valve down during low-rpm engine operation. Rather, it refers to the rocker arm which contains the VTEC switching piston and receives oil from the rocker shaft.

The primary exhaust rocker arm contacts a low-profile camshaft lobe during low-speed engine operation. Once VTEC engagement occurs, the oil pressure flowing from the exhaust rocker shaft into the primary exhaust rocker arm forces the VTEC switching piston into the secondary exhaust rocker arm, thereby locking both exhaust rocker arms together. The high-profile camshaft lobe which normally contacts the secondary exhaust rocker arm alone during low-speed engine operation is able to move both exhaust rocker arms together which are locked as a unit. The same occurs for the intake rocker shaft, except that the high-profile camshaft lobe operates the primary rocker arm.

The J37A2 is able to use both intake and exhaust VTEC by use of a novel design of the intake rocker arm. Each exhaust valve on the J37A2 corresponds to one primary and one secondary exhaust rocker arm. Therefore, there are a total of twelve primary exhaust rocker arms and twelve secondary exhaust rocker arms. However, each secondary intake rocker arm is shaped similar to a "Y" which allows it to contact two intake valves at once. One primary intake rocker arm corresponds to each secondary intake rocker arm. As a result of this design, there are only six primary intake rocker arms and six secondary intake rocker arms.

== VTEC-E ==
The earliest VTEC-E implementation is a variation of SOHC VTEC which is used to increase combustion efficiency at low rpm while maintaining the mid range performance of non-vtec engines. VTEC-E is the first version of VTEC to employ the use of roller rocker arms and because of that, it forgoes the need for having 3 intake lobes for actuating the two valves—two lobes for non-VTEC operation (one small and one medium-sized lobe) and one lobe for VTEC operation (the biggest lobe). Instead, there are two different intake cam profiles per cylinder: a very mild cam lobe with little lift and a normal cam lobe with moderate lift. Because of this, at low rpm, when VTEC is not engaged, one of the two intake valves is allowed to open only a very small amount due to the mild cam lobe, forcing most of the intake charge through the other open intake valve with the normal cam lobe. This induces swirl of the intake charge which improves air/fuel atomization in the cylinder and allows for a leaner fuel mixture to be used. As the engine's speed and load increase, both valves are needed to supply a sufficient mixture. When engaging VTEC mode, a pre-defined threshold of speed (must be moving), rpm and load must be met before the computer actuates a solenoid which directs pressurized oil into a sliding pin, just like with the original VTEC. This sliding pin connects the intake rocker arm followers together so that, now, both intake valves are following the "normal" camshaft lobe instead of just one of them. When in VTEC, since the "normal" cam lobe has the same timing and lift as the intake cam lobes of the SOHC non-VTEC engines, both engines have identical performance in the upper powerband assuming everything else is the same. This variant of the VTEC-E is used in some D-series engines.

With the later VTEC-E implementations, the only difference it has with the earlier VTEC-E is that the second normal cam profile has been replaced with a more aggressive cam profile which is identical to the original VTEC high-speed cam profile. This in essence supersedes VTEC and the earlier VTEC-E implementations since the fuel and low speed torque benefits of the earlier VTEC-E are combined with the high performance of the original VTEC. There are three intake cam lobes: two for the low-rpm mode (one for almost closed valve, one for normally opened) and one for the powerful mode when the VTEC solenoid is activated. The lowest rpm for activating the VTEC is 2500, or it may be higher if the load is weak - ECM dependant. With the VTEC solenoid is on the third biggest lobe begins to push all the intake valves with the more aggressively profile. This variant of the VTEC-E is used in the F23A, F22B and JDM F20B SOHC VTEC engines.

== Three-stage VTEC ==
Three-stage VTEC is a version that employs three different cam profiles to control intake valve timing and lift. Due to this version of VTEC being designed around a SOHC valve head, space was limited; so VTEC can modify only the opening and closing of the intake valves. The low-end fuel economy improvements of VTEC-E and the performance of conventional VTEC are combined in this application. From idle to 2500–3000 rpm, depending on load conditions, one intake valve fully opens while the other opens just slightly, enough to prevent pooling of fuel behind the valve, also called 12-valve mode. This 12 Valve mode results in swirl of the intake charge which increases combustion efficiency, resulting in improved low end torque and better fuel economy. At 3000–5400 rpm, depending on load, one of the VTEC solenoids engages, which causes the second valve to lock onto the first valve's camshaft lobe. Also called 16-valve mode, this method resembles a normal engine operating mode and improves the mid-range power curve. At 5500–7000 rpm, the second VTEC solenoid engages (both solenoids now engaged) so that both intake valves are using a middle, third camshaft lobe. The third lobe is tuned for high-performance and provides peak power at the top end of the rpm range.

In newer version of Three-stage i-VTEC combined VTC and PGM-FI to allow ECU to control full range of mode to achieve greater fuel economy improvements and performance. Honda CR-Z able to switch between low-end mode and standard mode from 1000 rpm to 2250 rpm uninterrupted and engage to high cam mode from 2250 rpm upward on SOHC.

== i-VTEC ==
Honda i-VTEC (intelligent-VTEC) is a system that combines VTEC with Honda's VTC (Variable Timing Control), a continuously variable camshaft phasing system used on the intake camshaft of DOHC VTEC engines. The technology first appeared on Honda's K-series four-cylinder engine family in 2001. Most Honda or Acura four-cylinder powered vehicles sold in the United States used i-VTEC by the 2002 model year with the exception being the 2002 Honda Accord.

VTEC controls of valve lift and valve duration are still limited to distinct low- and high-rpm profiles, but the intake camshaft is now capable of advancing between 25 and 50 degrees, depending upon engine configuration. Phasing is implemented by a computer-controlled, oil-driven adjustable cam sprocket. Both engine load and speed affect VTEC. The intake phase varies from fully retarded at idle to somewhat advanced at full throttle and low rpm. The effect is further optimization of torque output, especially at low and midrange rpm. There are two types of i-VTEC K series engines which are explained in the next section.

Honda's J-Series SOHC engines use an entirely different system also, confusingly, marketed as i-VTEC. Honda J-Series Engines using i-VTEC combine SOHC VTEC operation with Honda VCM (Variable Cylinder Management) variable displacement technology to improve fuel economy under light loads.

=== K-Series ===
The K-Series engines have two different types of i-VTEC system implementations. The first type is for performance engines like the K20A2 or K20Z3 used in the 2002–2006 RSX Type S or the 2006–2011 Civic Si and the second type is for economy engines like the K20A3 or K24A4 used in the 2002–2005 Civic Si or 2003–2007 Accord. The performance i-VTEC system is basically the same as the DOHC VTEC system of the B16A's. Both intake and exhaust cams have three cam lobes per cylinder. However, the valvetrain has the added benefit of roller rockers and VTC continuously variable intake cam timing. Performance i-VTEC is a combination of conventional DOHC VTEC with VTC (which operates for intake valves only). The VTC is available in the economy and performance i-VTEC engines.

The economy i-VTEC used in K20A3/K24A4 engines is more like the SOHC VTEC-E in that the intake cam has only two lobes, one very small and one larger, as well as no VTEC on the exhaust cam. At low rpm only one valve on the intake opens fully, promoting combustion chamber swirl and improved fuel atomization. This allows a leaner air/fuel mixture to be used, improving fuel economy. At higher speed, both intake valves run off the larger intake cam lobe, improving total air flow and top-end power.

The two types of engines are easily distinguishable by the factory rated power output: the performance engines make around 200 hp (150 kW) or more in stock form, while the economy engines do not make much more than 160 hp (120 kW).

=== R-Series ===
The i-VTEC system in the R-Series engine uses a modified SOHC VTEC system consisting of one small and two large lobes. The large lobes operate the intake valves directly while the small lobe is engaged during VTEC. Unlike typical VTEC systems, the system in the R-Series engine operates in a 'reverse' fashion engaging only at low to mid rpm. At low rpm, the small lobe locks onto one of the larger lobes and keeps one of the intake valves partially open during the compression cycle, similar to the Atkinson cycle. The ability for Honda to switch between Atkinson cycle and normal cycle allows excellent fuel efficiency without sacrificing too much performance.

=== i-VTEC with Variable Cylinder Management (VCM) ===
In 2003, Honda introduced an i-VTEC V6 (an update of the J-series) that includes Honda's cylinder deactivation technology which closes the valves on one bank of (3) cylinders during light load and low speed (below 80 km/h (50 mph)) operation. According to Honda,

VCM technology works on the principle that a vehicle only requires a fraction of its power output at cruising speeds. The system electronically deactivates cylinders to reduce fuel consumption. The engine is able to run on 3, 4, or all 6 cylinders based on the power requirement, essentially getting the best of both worlds. V6 power when accelerating or climbing, as well as the efficiency of a smaller engine when cruising.

The technology was originally introduced to the US on the 2005 Honda Odyssey minivan, and can now be found on the Honda Accord Hybrid, the 2006 Honda Pilot, and the 2008 Honda Accord. Example: EPA estimates for the 2011 (271 hp SOHC 3.5L) V6 Accord are 24 mpg combined vs. 27 in the two 4-cylinder-equipped models.

i-VTEC VCM was also used in the 1.3-liter LDA engine used in the 2001–2005 Honda Civic Hybrid.

=== i-VTEC i ===
A version of i-VTEC with direct injection, first used in 2004 Honda Stream. Direct injection 2.0L DOHC i-VTEC I gasoline engine.

- The 2-litre DOHC i-VTEC I integrates the i-VTEC system which uses the VTEC and VTC which uses a direct injection system for an air-fuel ratio of up to 65:1 for an unprecedented level of ultra-lean combustion. Stable combustion is achieved by using less fuel than conventional direct injection engines which have an air-fuel ratio of 40:1.
- Combustion control through the use of high-precision EGR valves and a newly developed high-performance catalyst enable the 2.0 litre DOHC i-VTEC I lean-burn direct injection engine which qualify as an ultra-low-emission vehicle (ULEV).

== AVTEC ==
The AVTEC (Advanced VTEC) engine was first announced in 2006. It combines continuously variable valve lift and timing control with continuously variable phase control. Honda originally planned to produce vehicles with AVTEC engines within next 3 years. Although it was speculated that it would first be used in 2008 Honda Accord, the vehicle instead utilizes the existing i-VTEC system. As of late 2017, no Honda vehicles use the AVTEC system.

=== Differences from other VTECs ===
Honda's advanced VTEC technology departs greatly from its previous incarnations by no longer relying on switching between two sets of lobes on a given camshaft. It instead uses a single cam lobe per valve, and two rocker arms per valve whereby the second rocker arm has a movable pivot point, thereby providing the varying cam lift. Advanced VTEC motors still use the now standard oil pressure controlled variable cam gear angle mechanism. With these two technologies combined Honda has developed an infinitely variable valve timing and lift system ("VVTL"). Previous versions of VTEC included only staged VVTL i.e. High-Low. With the introduction of i-VTEC the systems gained infinitely variable valve timing but still only staged lift i.e. High-Low. The "infinitely variable" portion of the A-VTEC is what makes it stand out as a serious evolutionary step in the world of VTEC.

=== Patent ===
A related U.S. patent (6,968,819) was filed on January 5, 2005.

Advanced VTEC has a standard camshaft and rocker arms, attached as they normally are with camshaft overhead, and rocker arms pushing down on the poppet valves. The camshaft is surrounded by a partially open drum which has secondary rocker arms attached to it via a pivoting point. These secondary rocker arms, which have a varying depth profile (similar to cams), are directly actuated by the camshaft, in a scissor-like manner. The primary rocker arms are actuated by the secondary (drum attached) rocker arms. The drum will only rotate to advance or retard the position of the secondary rocker arms, to take advantage of their varying profiles. Thus, through varying the position of the drum about its axis, each cam profile is changed to an optimal height for maximum engine performance without sacrificing fuel efficiency at lower speeds.

== VTEC TURBO ==
The VTEC TURBO engine series were introduced in 2013 as part of the Earth Dreams Technology range and include new features such as gasoline direct injection, turbochargers, Dual Cam VTC and VTEC on the exhaust profile instead of the intake, marking the end of the 'traditional sound' of VTEC in this engine. VTEC implementation on the exhaust rocker arms causes the turbo to be spooled quicker, eliminating turbo lag. VTEC Turbo engines come in three displacement capacities: a 1.0 liter 3-cylinder, a 1.5 liter 4-cylinder, and a 2.0 liter 4-cylinder.

Initial implementation for European vehicles included 2-litre 4-cylinder turbocharged engine used from 2015 Honda Civic Type R until present, which included Euro 6 emissions compliance.

== VTEC in motorcycles ==
Apart from the Japanese market-only Honda CB400SF Super Four HYPER VTEC, introduced in 1999, the first worldwide implementation of VTEC technology in a motorcycle occurred with the introduction of Honda's VFR800 sportbike in 2002. Similar to the SOHC VTEC-E style, one intake valve remains closed until a threshold of 6800 (6600 after 2006) rpm is reached, then the second valve is opened by an oil-pressure actuated pin. The dwell of the valves remains unchanged, as in the automobile VTEC-E, and little extra power is produced, but with a smoothing-out of the torque curve. Critics maintain that VTEC adds little to the VFR experience, while increasing the engine's complexity. Honda seemed to agree, as their VFR1200, a model announced in October 2009, came to replace the VFR800, which abandons the VTEC concept in favor of a large capacity narrow-vee "unicam", i.e., SOHC, engine. However, the 2014 VFR800 reintroduced the VTEC system from the 2002–2009 VFR motorcycle.

== See also ==
- MIVEC
- VVT-i
