= Honda Prelude =

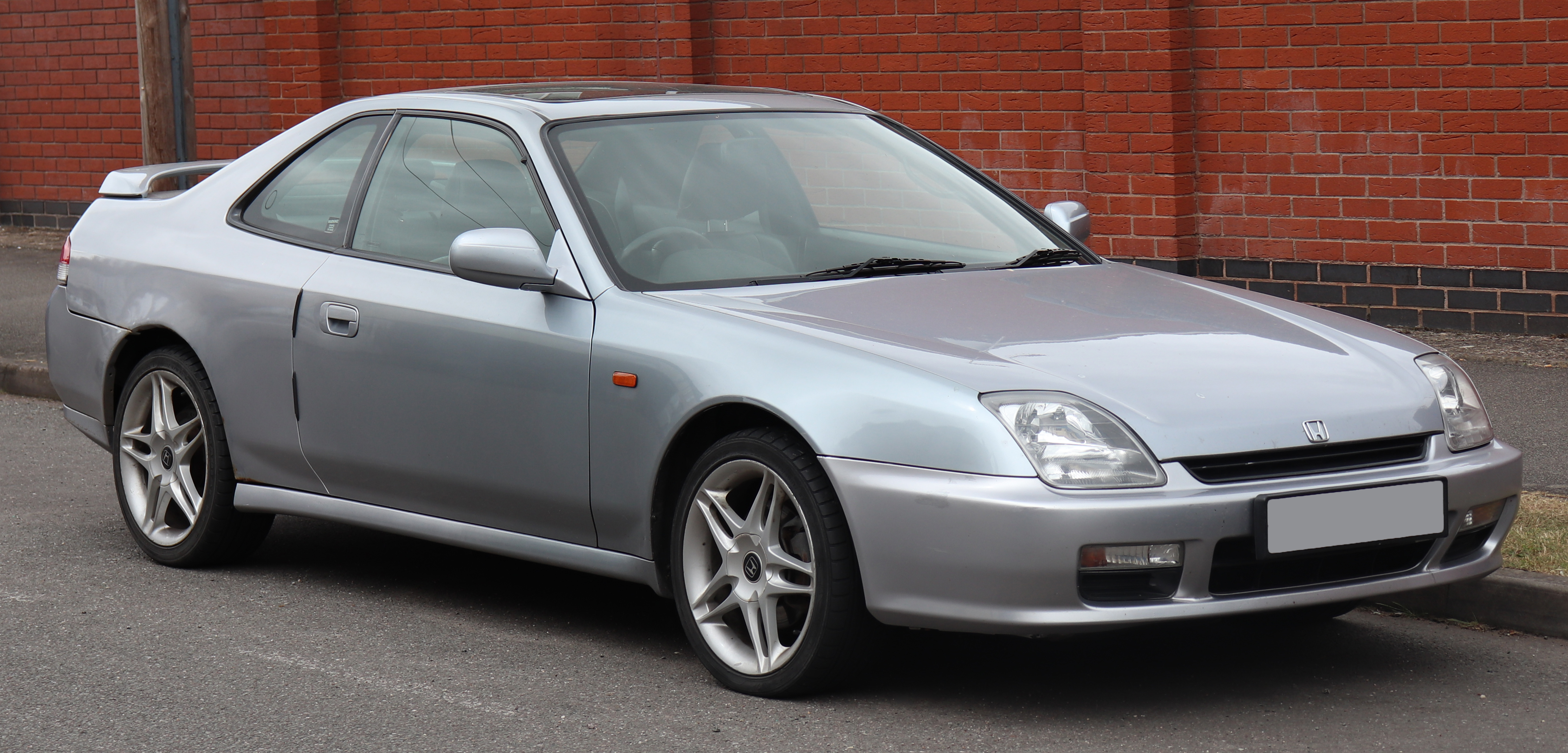
- 1998 Honda Prelude VTi (BB8, UK)

Overview
- Manufacturer: Honda
- Production: November 1978 – October 2001; August 2025 – present
- Assembly: Japan: Sayama, Saitama (1978–2001); Yorii, Saitama (2025–present)

Body and chassis
- Class: Sport compact car
- Body style: 2-door notchback coupe (1978–2001); 3-door liftback coupe (2025–present)
- Layout: Front-engine, front-wheel-drive

Chronology
- Predecessor: Honda 145 coupé

The Honda Prelude (Japanese: ホンダ・プレリュード, Hepburn: Honda Pureryūdo) is a sport compact car produced by the Japanese company Honda. It was produced over five generations from 1978 to 2001, and reintroduced in 2025.

For the first five generations, as a two-door coupe loosely derived from the Accord, the Prelude was the first Honda to feature a moonroof, a feature that remained standard equipment throughout its production.

The Prelude was used by Honda to introduce the Japanese Honda retail sales chain Honda Verno, with the international release of the model following shortly after. The Prelude's manufacture concluded in 2001 on introduction of the fourth-generation Integra. The Prelude name was originally trademarked by Toyota, but was amicably given to Honda for use.

The Prelude's nameplate aligned with a series of music-themed nameplates in use by Honda, including the Accord, Quintet, Concerto, Jazz, and Ballade.

== First generation (SN; 1978) ==
First generation
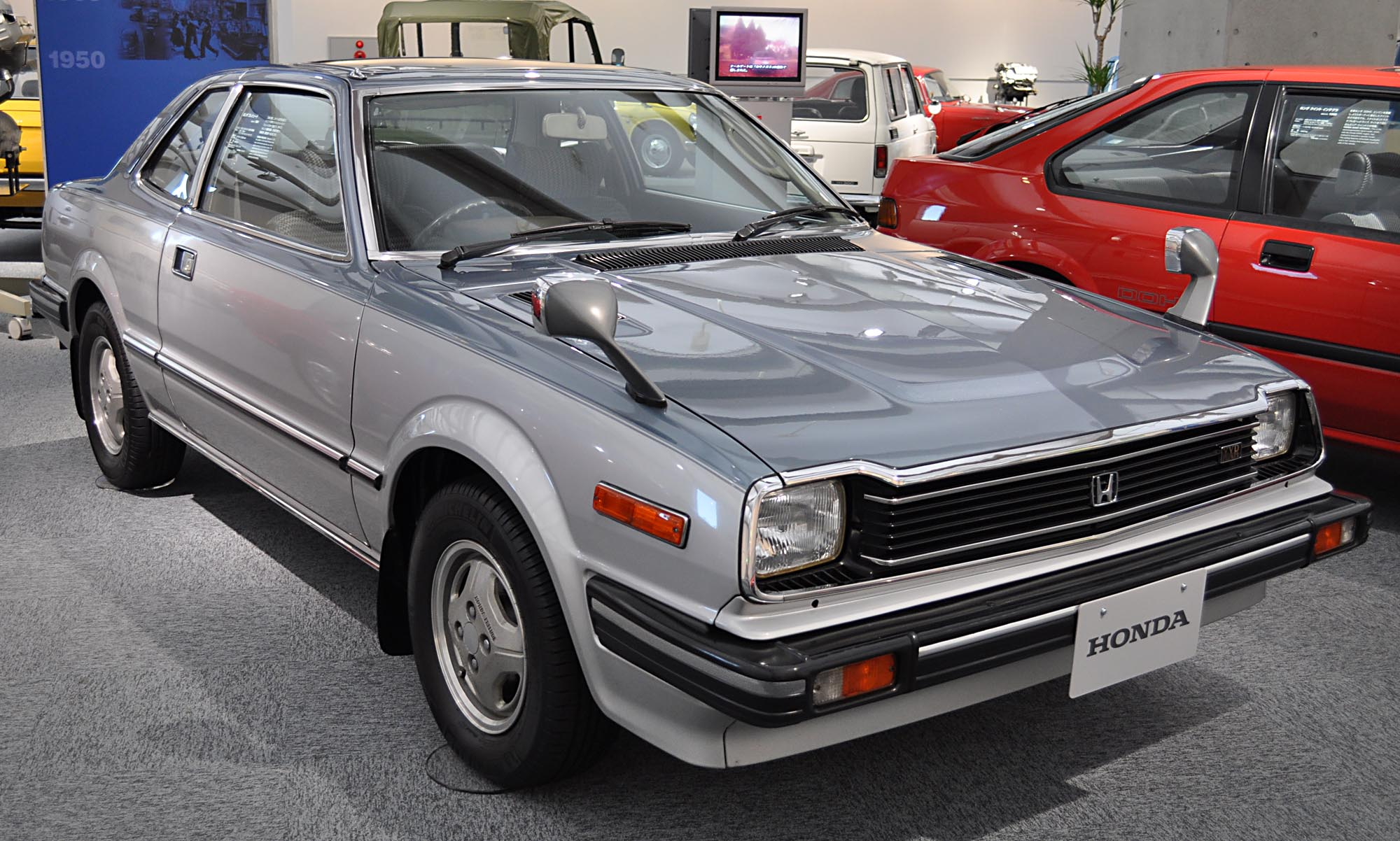
- 1982 Honda Prelude XXR Model (Japan)

Overview
- Model code: SN
- Production: 1978–1982
- Designer: Shinya Iwakura, Hiroshi Kizawa (1976)

Body and chassis
- Body style: 2-door coupe

Powertrain
- Engine: 1,602 cc EL 8-valve I4; 1,751 cc EK CVCC 12-valve I4
- Transmission: 5-speed manual (1978-82); 3-speed automatic (1979-82); 2-speed semi-automatic (Hondamatic) (1978-79)

Dimensions
- Wheelbase: 2,320 mm (91.3 in)
- Length: 4,090 mm (161.0 in)
- Width: 1,635 mm (64.4 in)
- Height: 1,290 mm (50.8 in)
- Curb weight: 900 kg (1,984 lb)

On 24 November 1978, the Prelude was launched to the Japanese market. It had its world premiere at the 1979 AutoRAI in Amsterdam, two months later. In Japan it was only available at the newly established dealership sales channel Honda Verno. This dealership chain also introduced the Honda Quint, the Honda Ballade, and the Accord-based Honda Vigor as its largest sedan and hatchback. The four-wheel independent struts, brakes, and engine were all borrowed from the first-generation Accord, but the chassis was all new and developed by chief engineer Hiroshi Kizawa expressly for the sporting Prelude. At 4,090 mm (length) x 1,635 mm (width) x 1,290 mm (height), it had quite a low and wide profile. The wheelbase was 2,320 mm, and was 60 mm shorter than that of the original Accord. Honda appears to have followed the successful introduction of the Toyota Celica example by taking a small car, like the Accord, installing a more powerful engine, and giving the body a short trunk, and a long engine hood. The Prelude (and period Accord) were the first cars under two liters to receive standard power steering. The Prelude also benefited from Honda's experience with sporting cars like the Honda S800 and Coupé 1300.

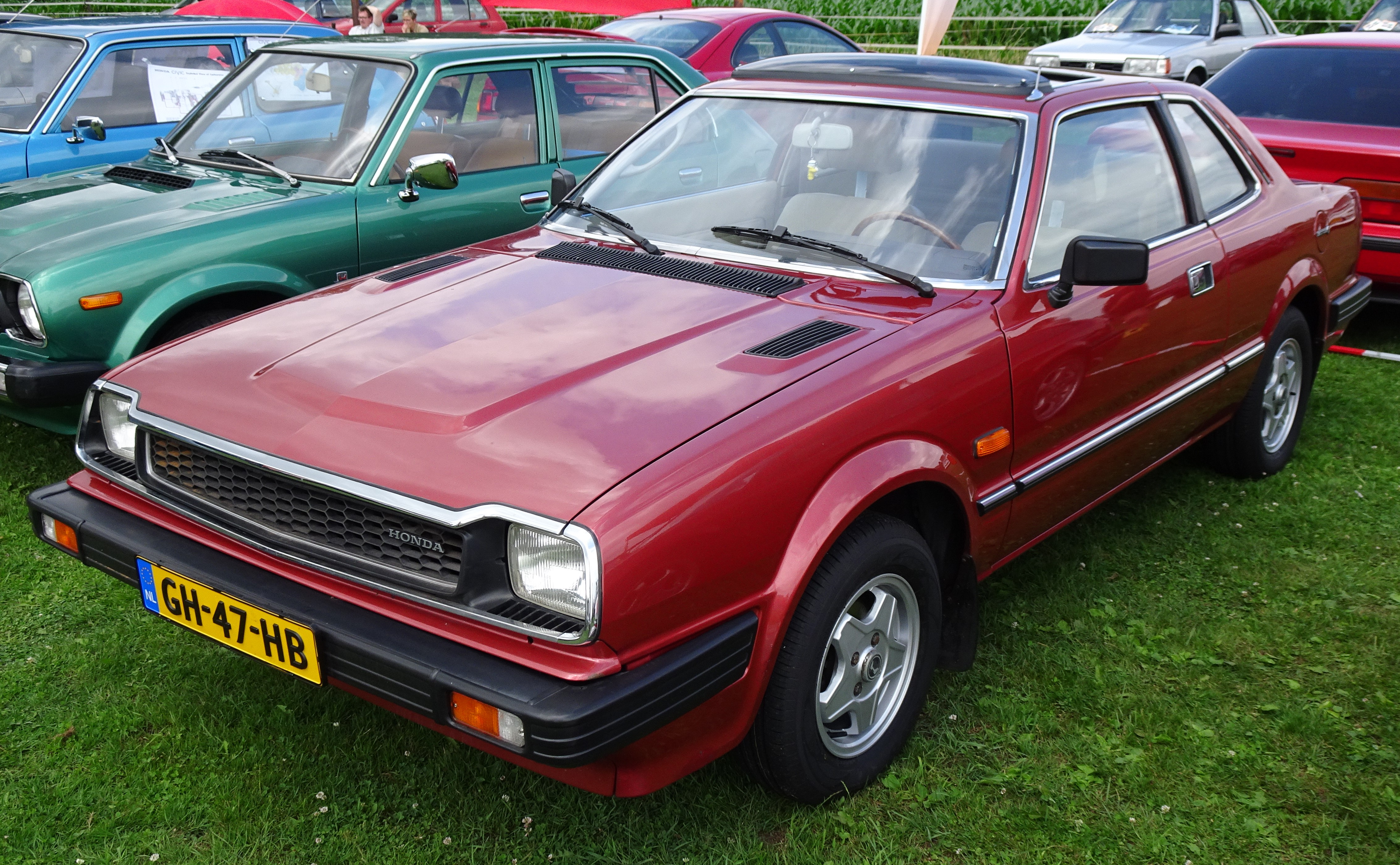
1980 Prelude (Europe)

The Prelude was the first Honda model to offer a power moonroof as standard equipment, which eventually became a Prelude trademark. In Japan, the Prelude was available with a sliding metal sunroof, while US versions received a glass top which freed up more headroom. Japanese buyers were liable for slightly more annual road taxes over the smaller Civic, which also had a smaller engine. While marketed as a 2+2, the rear seat was not usable for anyone larger than a small child.

Initial reviews for the Prelude were favorable. "It is," wrote Brock Yates for Motor Trend, "by any sane measurement, a splendid automobile. The machine, like all Hondas, embodies fabrication that is, in my opinion, surpassed only by the narrowest of margins by Mercedes-Benz. It is a relatively powerful little automobile by anybody's standards." Motor Trend measured an early Prelude completing the quarter-mile in 18.8 seconds at 70 mph. In terms of underpinnings it was mostly a Honda Accord, although its more compact package and lower weight allowed for a marginally higher top speed and gas mileage.

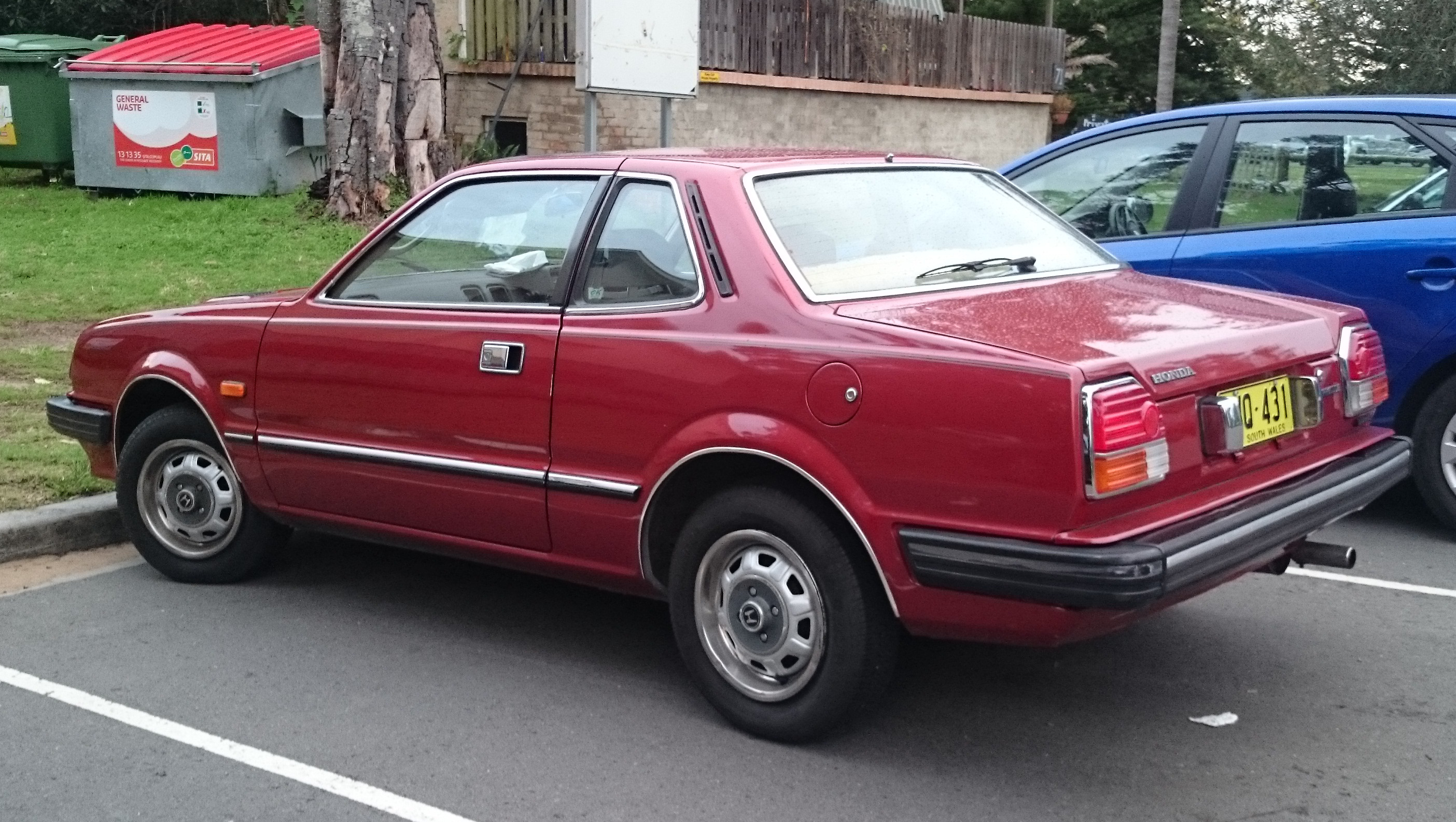
Rear view of Honda Prelude (SN, Australia)

The standard engine at the time of introduction was the "EL" SOHC eight-valve 1,602 cc (non-CVCC) inline-four rated at 80 PS (59 kW) at 5,000 rpm and 12.9 kg⋅m (127 N⋅m; 93 lb⋅ft) at 3,500 rpm. It remained the only engine available for most markets, aside from the US and Japan. It featured a non-automatic choke with three positions and a two-barrel carburetor. In September 1978 the larger "EK" SOHC 12-valve 1,751 cc CVCC inline-four was introduced in Japan, rated at 90 PS (66 kW) at 5,300 rpm (SAE gross). Automatics had five less horsepower. It took until March 1979 for the Prelude to appear in the United States, then with 72 hp (54 kW) at 4,500 rpm and 94 lb⋅ft (127 N⋅m) at 3,000 rpm (SAE net) from the larger 1.8 engine. The EK engine made use of an engine oil cooler and transistor-controlled ignition system.

Transmission choices were either the standard five-speed manual or initially a two-speed "Hondamatic" semi-automatic, which by October 1979 had been replaced by a three-speed automatic that used the final gear as the overdrive. In addition to the standard fabrics offered in most models, an 'Executive' option was offered in some markets which added power steering and Connolly leather upholstery. Honda used a single central gauge cluster design in this car which housed the speedometer and tachometer in one combined unit where both instrument's needles swept along the same arc. They also placed the compact AM/FM radio unit up high next to the gauge cluster. The Prelude featured intermittent wipers, tinted glass, and a remote trunk release. 1980 saw the introduction of the CVCC-II engine which employed the use of a catalytic converter and several other refinements that improved driveability, the Prelude also received a mild facelift in 1981. This facelift meant a return to a more traditional dashboard, rather than the much critiqued "Concentrated Target Meter" used before. The 1981 Prelude also received a stainless steel trim strip along the bumpers and side moldings, as well as a new grille. 313,000 units were manufactured by Honda from 1978 to 1982, with over 80% being sold outside of Japan. 41,190 Preludes were sold in the home market during its production run.

The Prelude was introduced in Europe during 1979, but was not a strong seller, its high asking price not helping its chances of sales success.

== Second generation (AB/BA1/2/3/6/BB; 1982) ==
Second generation
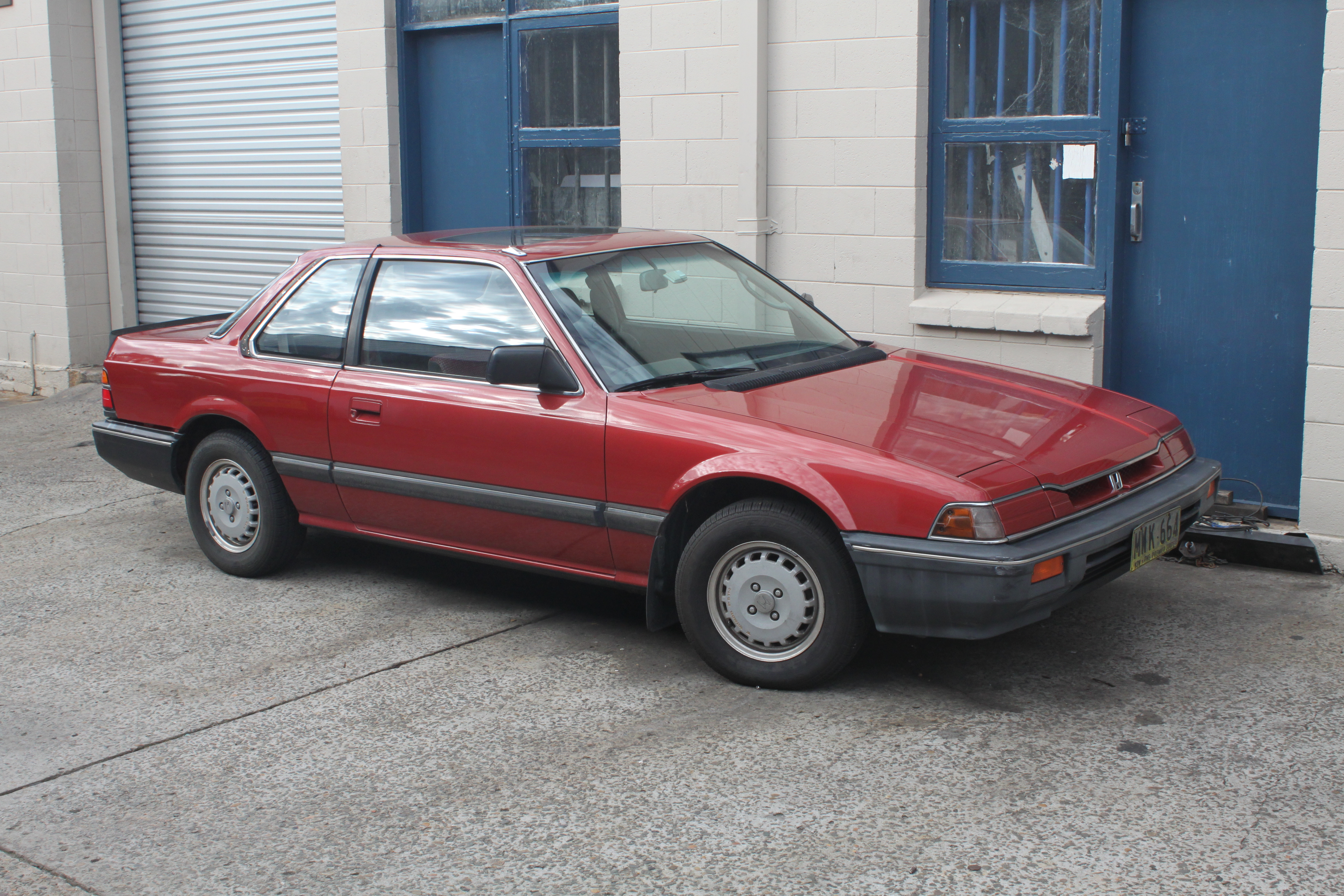
- Pre-facelift Honda Prelude EX in Australia

Overview
- Model code: AB, BA1/2/3/6, BB
- Production: 1982–1987
- Designer: Masahito Nakano (1979)

Body and chassis
- Body style: 2-door coupe

Powertrain
- Engine: 1829 cc A18A/ET 12-valve I4; 1829 cc ES CVCC 12-valve I4; 1955 cc A20A3 12-valve I4; 1958 cc B20A DOHC 16-valve I4
- Transmission: 5-speed manual 4-speed automatic

Dimensions
- Wheelbase: 2,451 mm (96.5 in)
- Length: 4,374 mm (172.2 in)
- Width: 1,689 mm (66.5 in)
- Height: 1,295 mm (51 in)
- Curb weight: 918 kg (2,023 lb) - 1,340 kg (2,954 lb) (depending on model)

The second-generation Prelude was released in Japan on 25 November 1982 and worldwide in the spring of 1983. Riding on an all-new platform, the Prelude was initially available with an A18A or ET-2, 1.8 L 12-valve twin carburetor engine, producing 105 PS DIN (77 kW). In Japan, Asia and Europe, it later became available with a 2-liter DOHC 16-valve PGM-FI engine (JDM = BA1, EU = BA2) although this engine was not released in Europe until 1986. The JDM B20A produced 160 PS JIS (118 kW) at 6300 rpm, while the European B20A1 produced only 137 hp (102 kW). This was the first generation of Prelude to have pop-up headlights, which allowed for a more aerodynamic front clip, reducing drag. Opening the headlights, however, especially at higher speeds, produced significantly more drag. The design retained nothing of the first generation, being considerably more aerodynamic and with large glass surfaces. As with the predecessor, it was amply equipped, with an air of "mini-gran turismo" rather than that of a sports car. It also offered, as an option, Honda's new "A.L.B." anti-lock brakes.

In Japan, the Prelude was one of the key models sold at Japanese Honda dealership sales channels, called Honda Verno, which offered performance-oriented products. All Honda Verno products, like the Vigor, initially shared the concealed headlights introduced with this generation Prelude that would help identify "sports" products from Honda in Japan. The approach was short-lived, however. The model with the 2.0 liter engine was regarded as the top level car in Japan because Japanese buyers were liable for a higher annual road tax over the car with the 1.8 liter engine. The Japanese 1.8 had CVCC and claimed 125 PS JIS (92 kW), considerably more than export models.

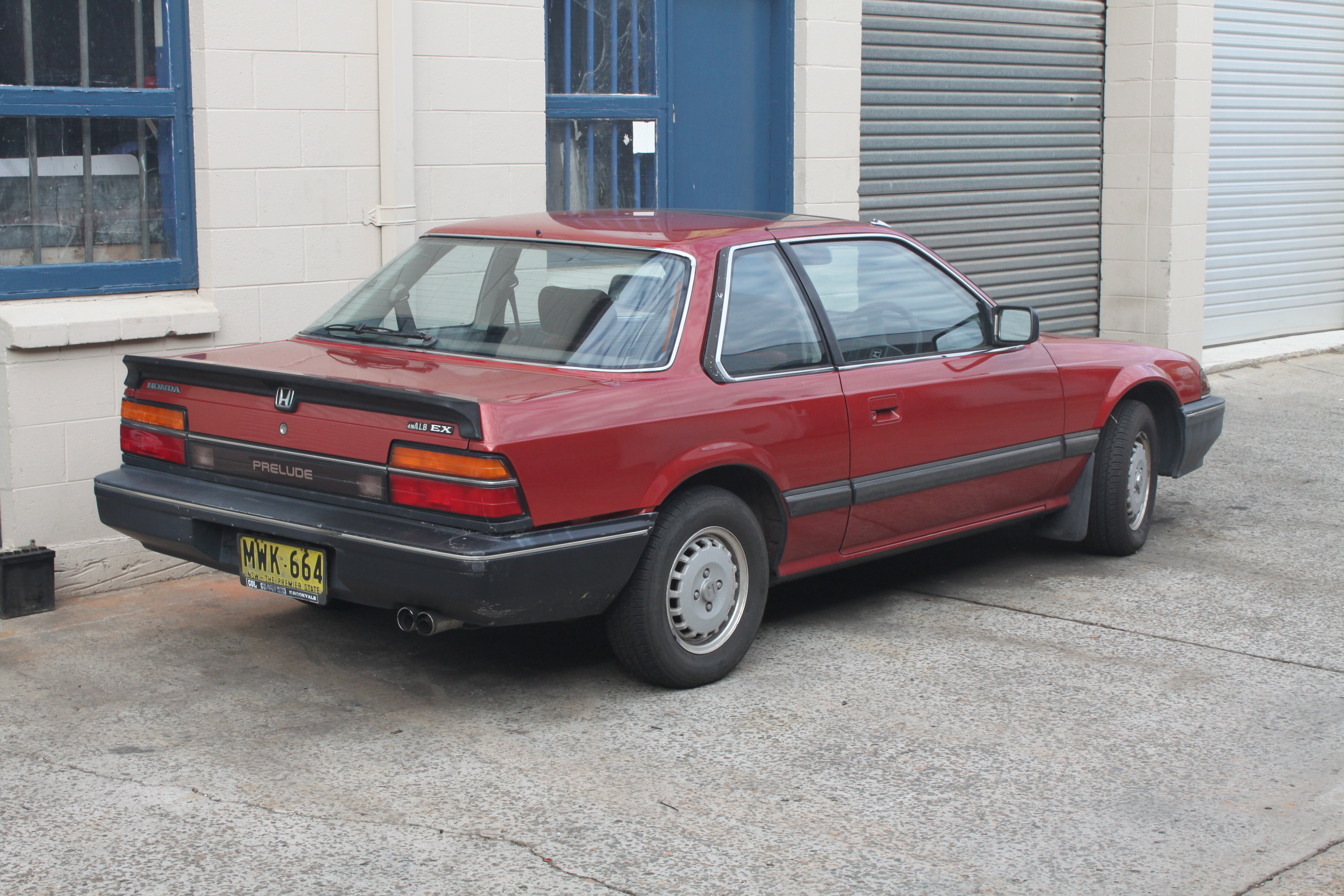
Pre-facelift Honda Prelude EX in Australia

When the 2-liter 16-valve DOHC engine came out the hood had to be slightly modified since the larger engine could not fit under the original hood. The original 1.8-liter engine was developed specifically for the Prelude to allow a low hoodline, even tilting the engine backward to make it lower still. The European version also saw slight modifications to the rear lights and revised front and rear bumpers which were now color-matched. Due to the fairly low weight of the car (1,025 kg or 2,260 lb) and high power (the 16-valve engine produced 160 PS or 118 kW in Japanese trim), the car was relatively nimble in comparison to its competitors, which most Preludes had not been up to that time.

The North American 1983 model is identifiable by its standard painted steel wheels with bright trim rings (although alloy rims were optional). The 1984-87 base models had Civic-style full wheel covers. In Canada, a "Special Edition" trim was created, which is essentially the same as the USA 2.0Si "sport injected" model. Fuel injection was introduced in the "Si" models in 1985. North American 1.8's offered 100 hp (75 kW) at 5,500 rpm, while the later 2.0 has 110 hp (82 kW) at the same engine speed.

This version of the Prelude was far more popular in Britain than its predecessor, and sold well at a time when sports cars were declining in popularity and many manufacturers were withdrawing from this market sector; including Ford, who did not replace the Capri after its 1986 demise, even though it had been one of Britain's 10 most popular new cars as recently as 1980. The European lineup originally consisted of the base Prelude, without power steering, and the well-equipped EX which was also available with an automatic transmission and the A.L.B. brakes.

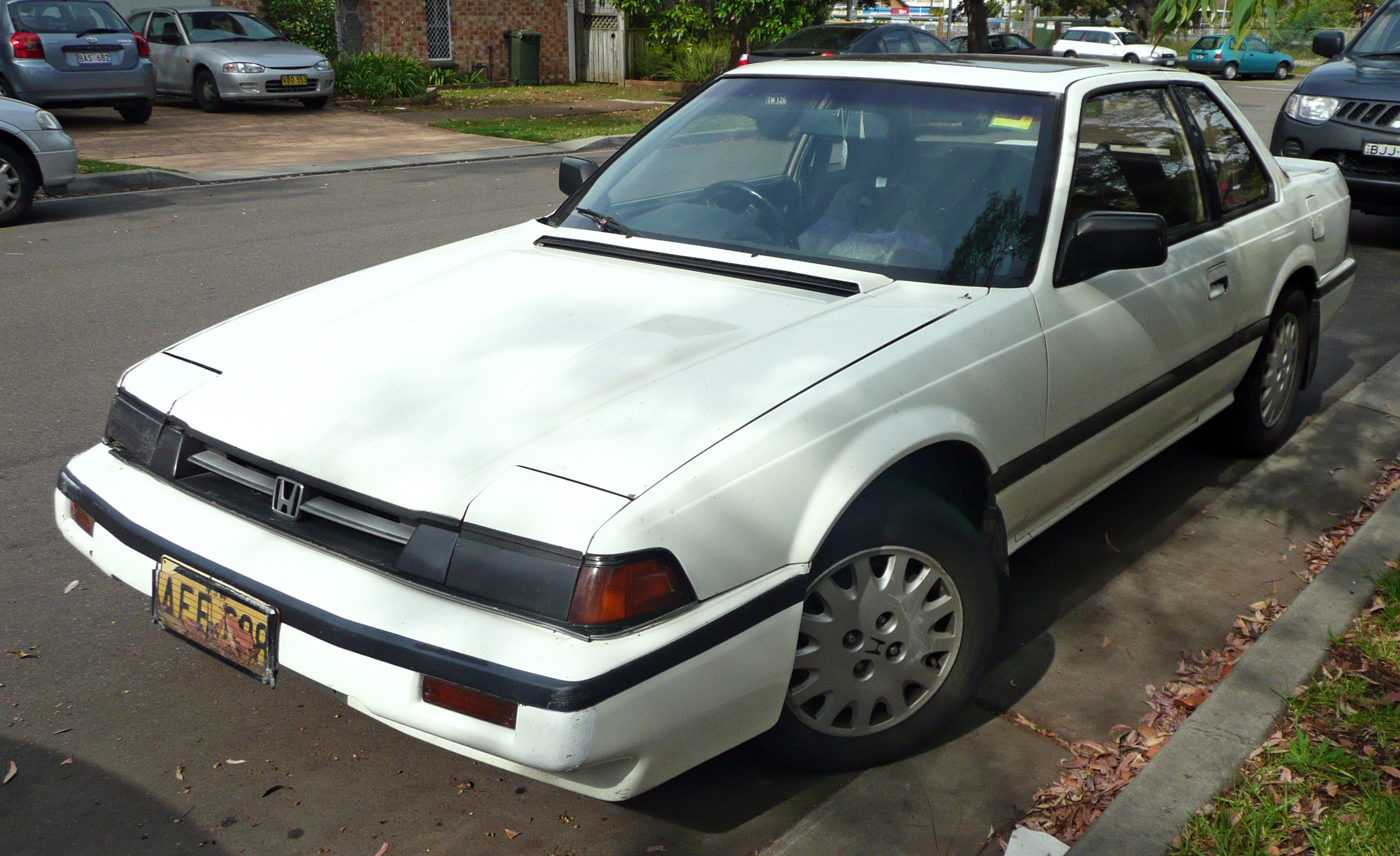
1986–1987 Honda Prelude Si coupe (Australia)

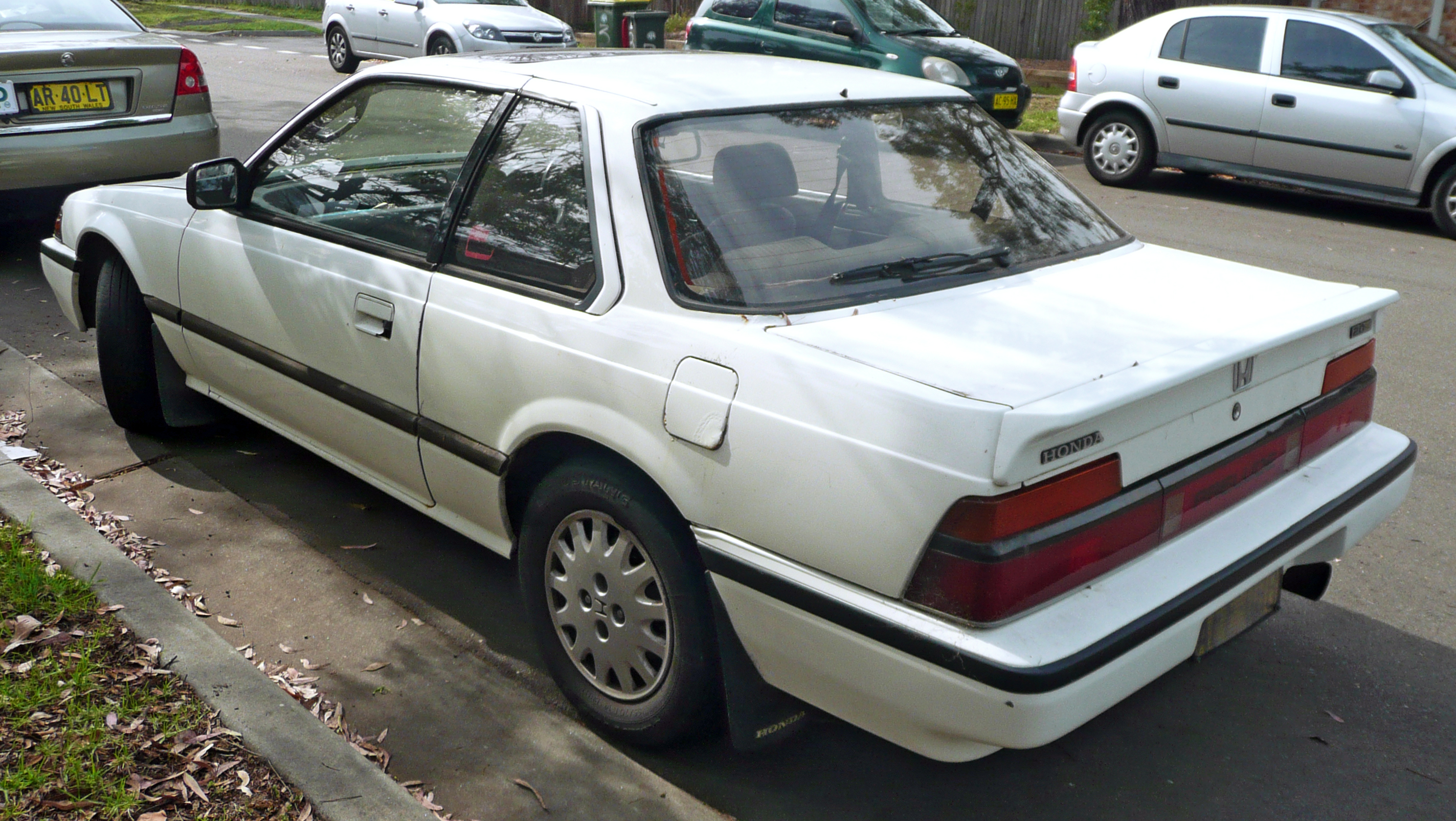
1986–1987 Honda Prelude Si coupe (Australia)

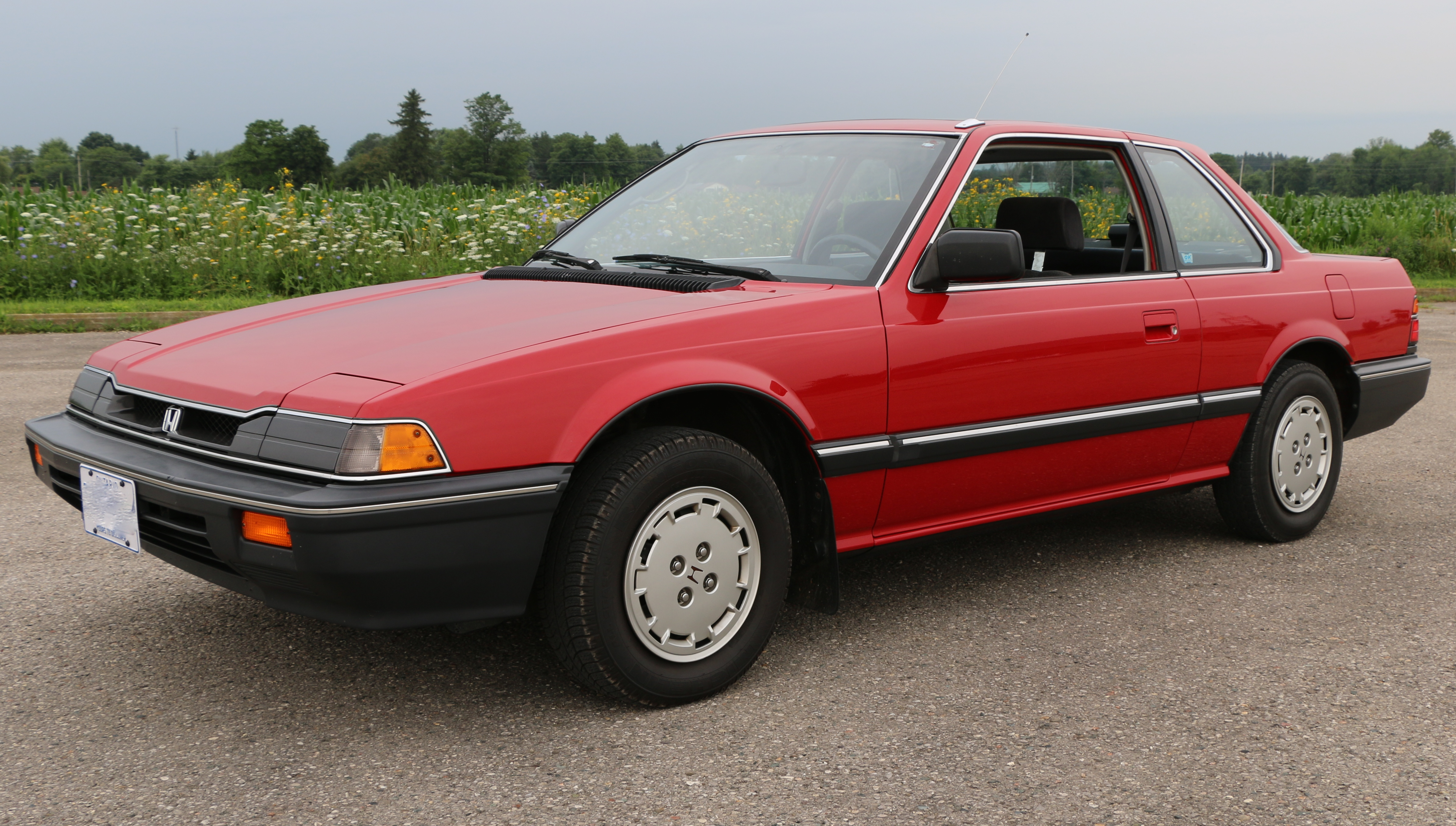
1987 Honda Prelude base 1.8 twin carb. (Canada)

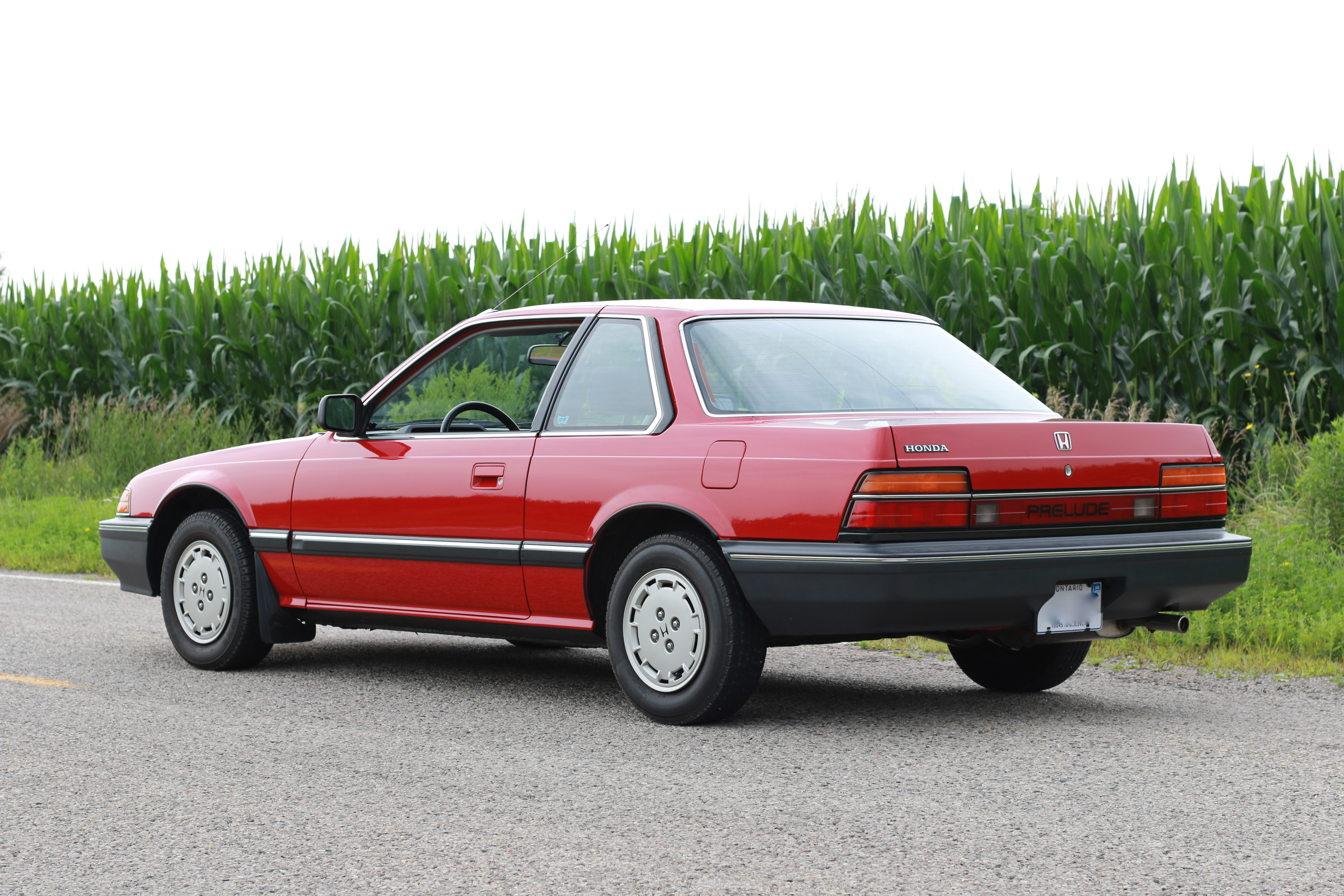
1987 Honda Prelude base 1.8L DOHC, twin carb. (Canada)

== Third generation (BA3/4/5/7; 1987) ==
Third generation
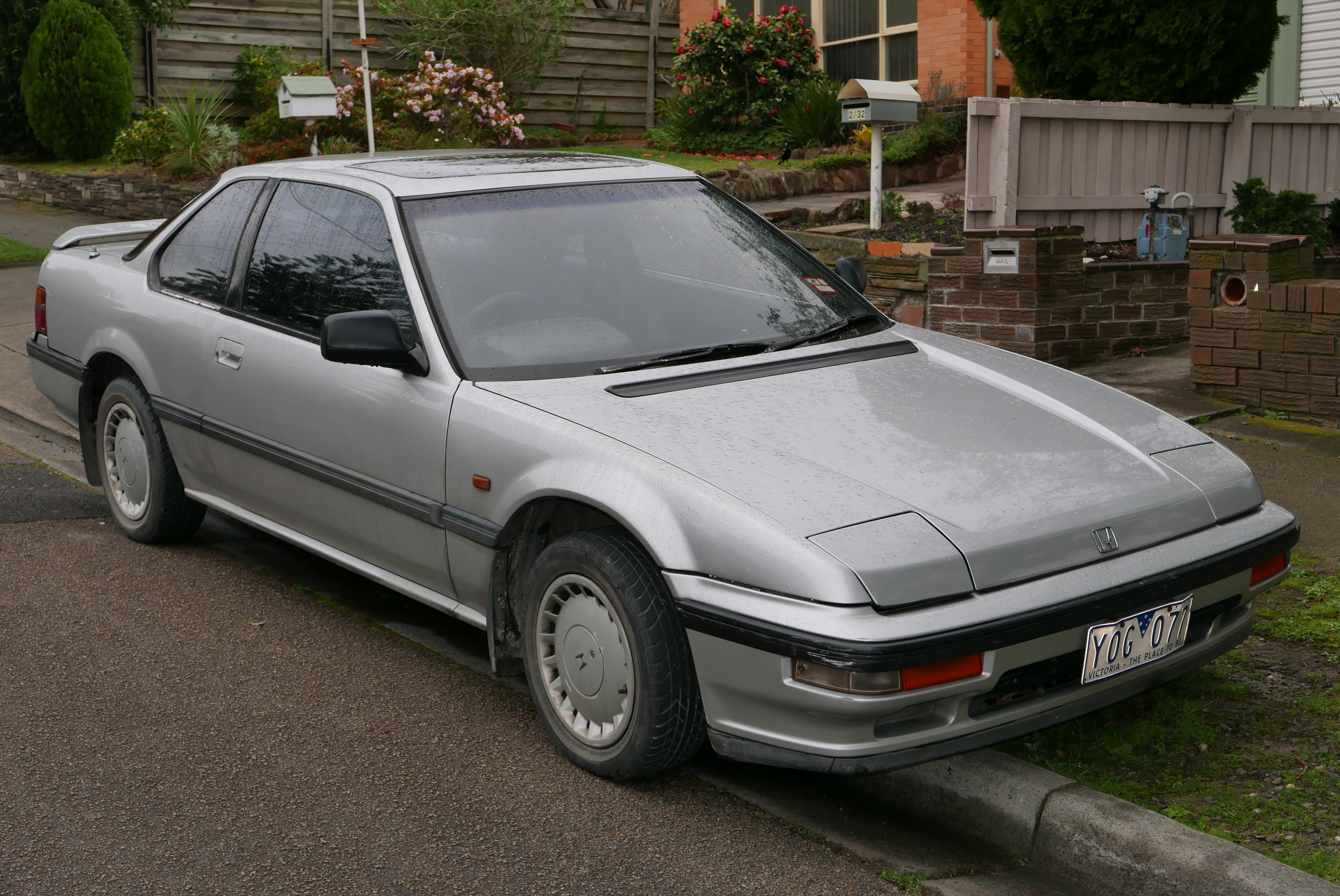
- Pre-facelift Honda Prelude 4WS 2.0 Si (Australia)

Overview
- Model code: BA3/4/5/7
- Production: 1987–1991
- Designer: Masato Nakano, Tomoyuki Arai, Yusuke Saito (1985)

Body and chassis
- Body style: 2-door coupe

Powertrain
- Engine: 2.0 L B20A3/A4 SOHC I4; 2.0 L B20A DOHC I4; 2.1 L B21A DOHC I4
- Transmission: 5-speed manual 4-speed automatic

Dimensions
- Wheelbase: 2,565 mm (101 in)
- Length: 4,460 mm (175.6 in) (1988-89); 4,511 mm (177.6 in) (1990-91)
- Width: 1,694 mm (66.7 in) (Japan); 1,709 mm (67.3 in)
- Height: 1,295 mm (51 in) (1988-89); 1,250 mm (49.2 in) (1990-91)
- Curb weight: 1,060 kg (2,337 lb) - 1,340 kg (2,954 lb) (depending on model)

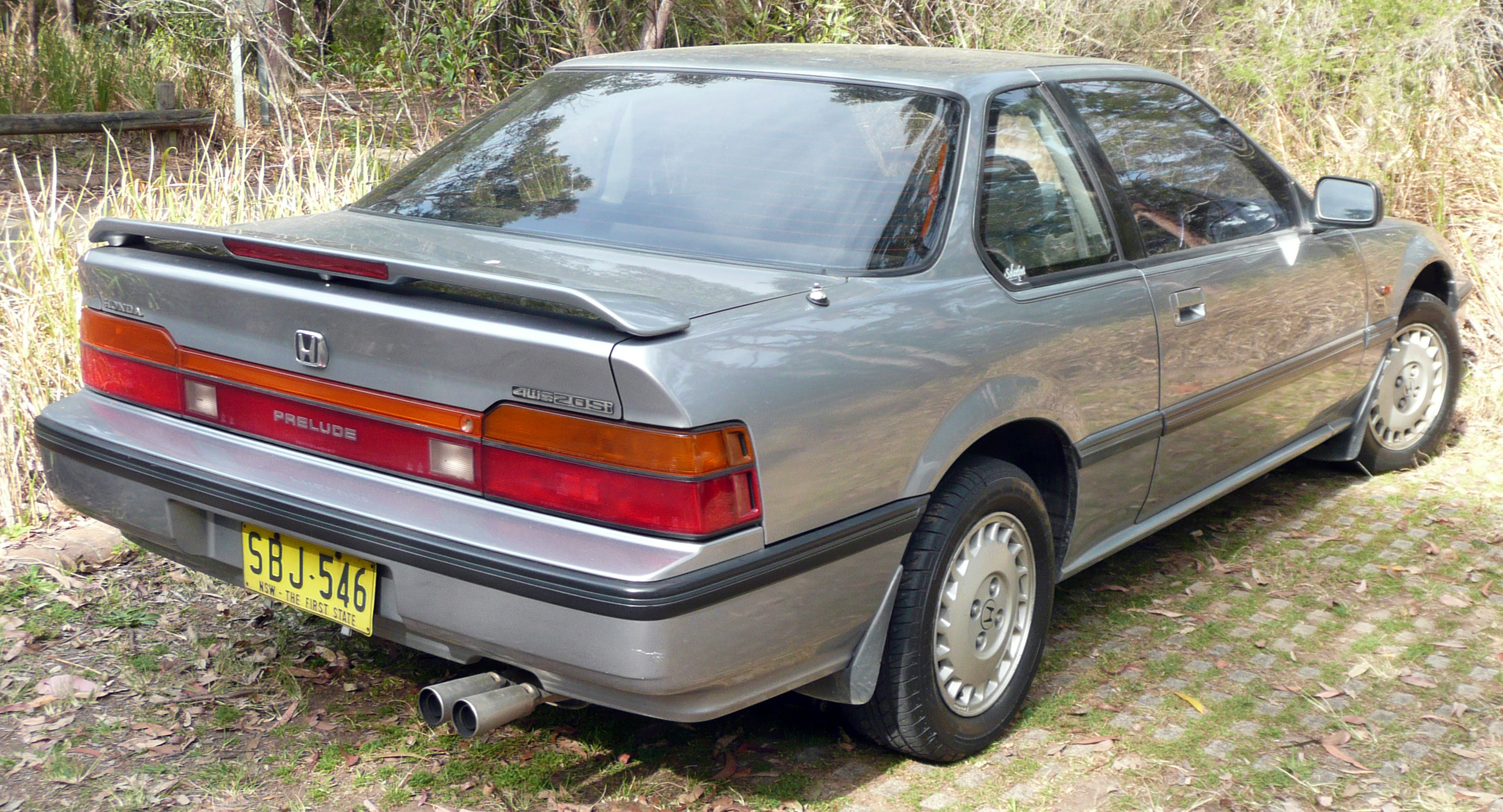
Pre-facelift Honda Prelude 4WS 2.0 Si (Australia)

On 9 April 1987, the third-generation Prelude was released in the Japanese domestic market and released later that year worldwide, being a 1988 model in North America. Featuring evolutionary styling from its predecessor, it shared design cues from the Honda NSX that would be introduced later in 1990. The Prelude featured innovative features for its time such as a 0.34 drag coefficient, roof pillars made of high-strength metal and its signature feature, the available option of the world's first mechanical four-wheel steering system available in a mass-production passenger car, which was later shared with the Honda Ascot 2.0FBT-i sedan.

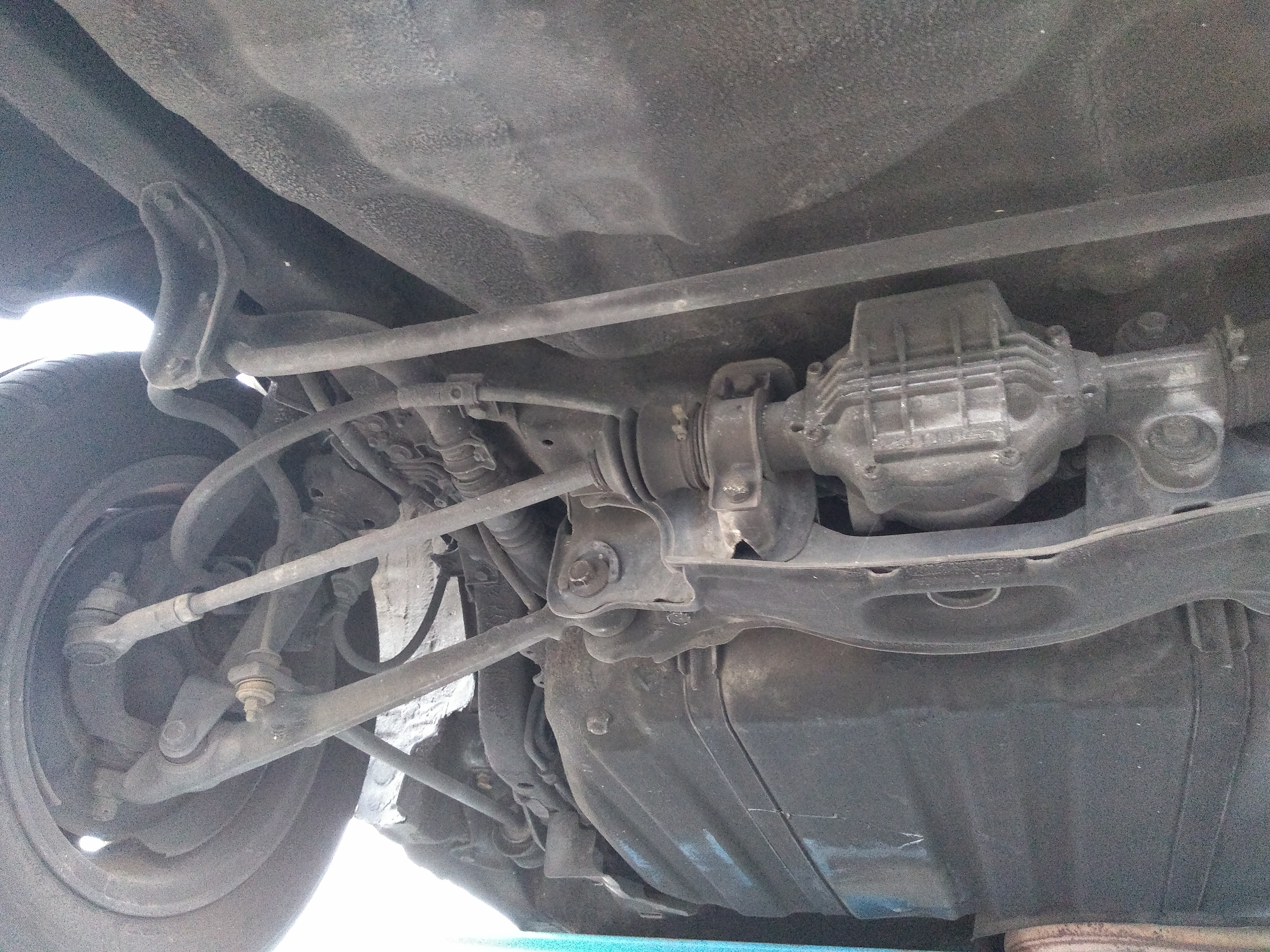
Honda Prelude Mk III rear steering box

The mechanical four-wheel steering setup used two steering boxes, linked together with a dedicated steering shaft. Despite its complexity, it provided the driver additional benefits. At highway speeds lane changes required minimal steering input, and served as a safety feature providing more responsive and quicker maneuverability in adverse conditions. It also aided in low speed driving conditions such as parallel parking. The front and rear wheels would turn in opposite directions once the steering wheel had been turned 140 degrees. A 'Road & Track' magazine comparison between the Prelude and a C4-series Chevrolet Corvette favored the Prelude in a slalom speed test.

Honda had expected 30% of buyers to opt for four-wheel-steering, but the feature was a runaway success in the home market, and 80% of buyers opted for it in the first year.

The third-generation Prelude was exclusively powered by variants of the Honda B20A engine, a base carbureted version with a SOHC 12-valve valvetrain, or a DOHC variant with Honda's PGM-FI fuel injection and 16 valves. The engine was tilted backwards by 18 degrees, which made it possible to make the hood 30 mm (1.2 in) lower than on the previous generation.

It was well received by judges of the European Car of the Year accolade for 1988, finishing third in a contest where the Peugeot 405 was the runaway winner and the Citroën AX came second. This was one of the best performances by a Japanese built or branded car until the Nissan Micra won the award five years later.

Third-generation Honda Prelude engines:

B20A/B20A1 - 2.0L DOHC PGM-FI 160/143 PS (Japan/Europe)
B20A3 - 2.0L SOHC 12v carb 104 hp North America
B20A4 - 2.0L SOHC 12v carb 114 PS (84 kW)Global, except North America
B20A5 - 2.0L DOHC PGM-FI 135 hp (101 kW) North America
B20A6 - 2.0L DOHC PGM-FI 142 PS (104 kW) Oceania
B20A7 - 2.0L DOHC PGM-FI 150 PS (110 kW) Europe, New Zealand
B20A8 - 2.0L DOHC PGM-FI 133 PS (98 kW) Europe
B20A9 - 2.0L DOHC PGM-FI 140 PS (103 kW) Europe
B21A - 2.1L DOHC PGM-FI 145 PS (107 kW) Japan (SI States)
B21A1 - 2.1L DOHC PGM-FI 140 hp (104 kW) North America

In 1987, Road & Track published a test summary that shows the 1988 Honda Prelude 2.0Si 4WS outperforming every car of that year on the slalom, with a speed of 65.5 mph (105.4 km/h), even besting exotics such as Porsche and Ferrari. For reference, the 1988 Chevrolet Corvette C4 took the same course at 64.9 mph (104.4 km/h).

The Prelude was Wheels magazine's Car of the Year for 1987.

=== Facelift ===
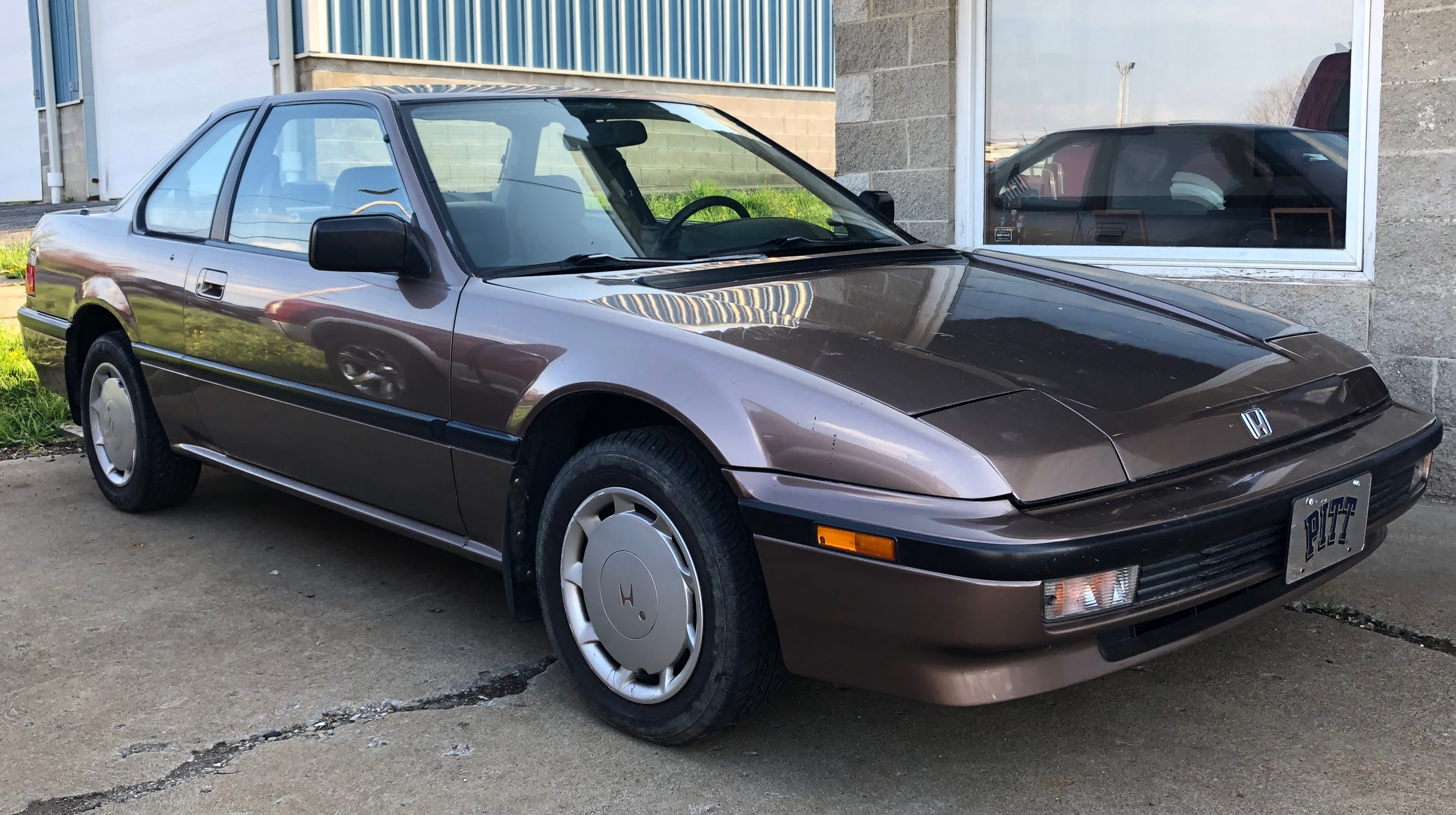
Facelift Honda Prelude 2.0Si (USA)

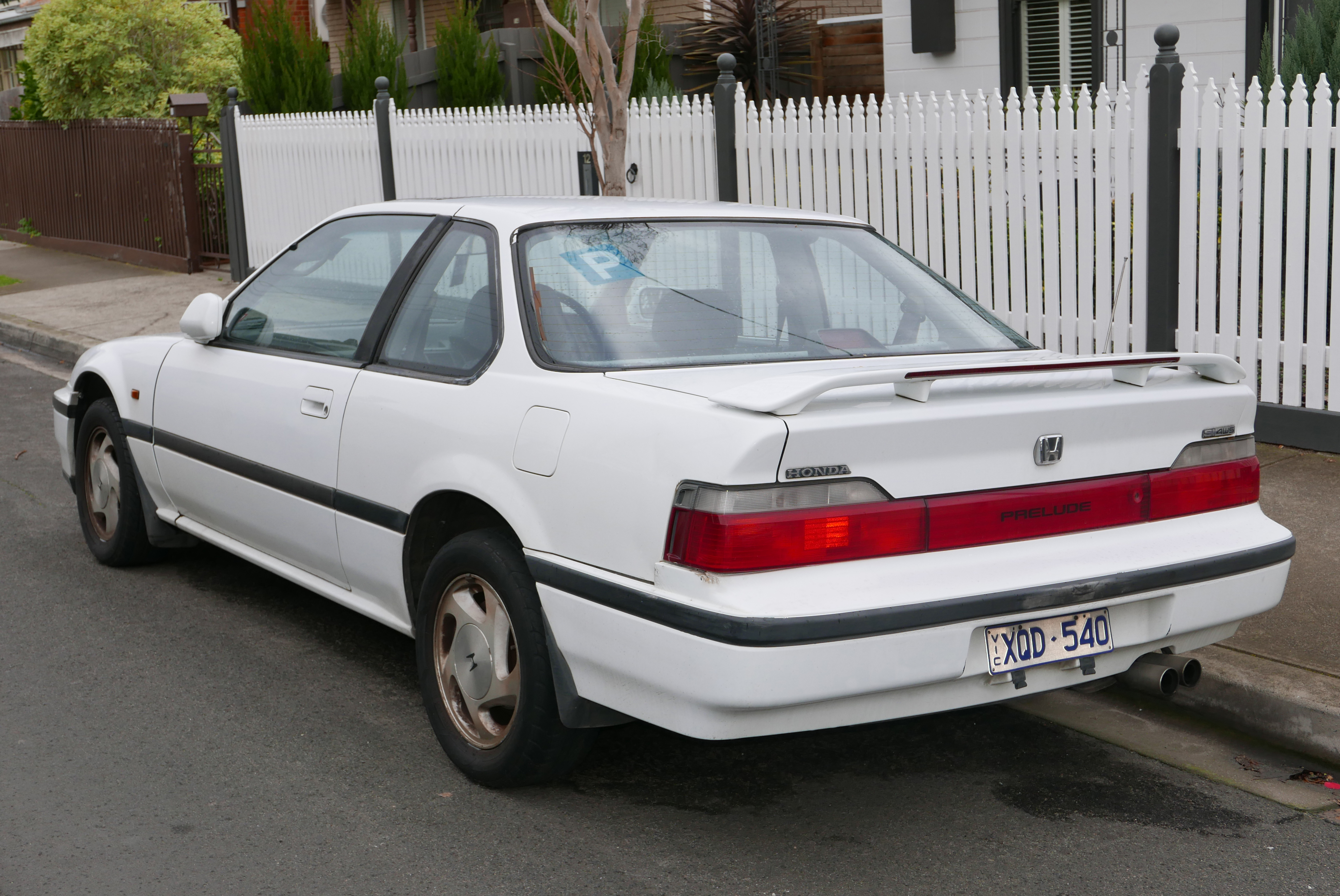
Facelift Honda Prelude Si 4WS (Australia)

The facelift third-generation Prelude was revealed in Japan on 21 November 1989. The front and rear bumpers were revised on the new Prelude. The rear front bumper and rear tail lights featured clear indicators and a revised parking light design. Many of the interior parts were also revised, including the dash bezel, the door handle and window switches. The Japanese version of the Si with the B20A was rated 140 PS with the JDM engine and was rated for 37 MPG.

In the US, the facelifted Prelude debuted for the 1990 model year, with the carbureted 2.0S model being discontinued. The fuel-injected 2.0 Si became the entry-level model, being supplanted by a new Si model with the B21A1 engine, with Si 4WS or Si ALB (ABS) as optional trim models. The revised version of the B20A5, called the B21A1 was available. It was bored to 83 mm (3.3 in) with a total displacement of 2,056 cc producing up to 145 hp (108 kW) and had a special cylinder liner featuring FRM (fiber reinforced metal) that is reported to be extremely tough. This causes premature piston ring wear contributing to exceptionally high oil consumption.

For the Canadian market, the S, SR and SR 4WS models were introduced for 1990. In 1991, SR ALB and SE models were introduced. The SE model was closer to the JDM and EDM models in that it was fully optioned with leather interior and was equipped with both 4WS and ALB.

==== Prelude INX ====
Along with the facelift, a new Prelude model was introduced to the Japanese domestic market, the Prelude INX. It featured fixed headlights, with a front fascia very similar to the contemporary Honda Legend coupe and Honda Accord of the same time period. It also featured chrome trim on the headlights front and rear bumpers, side moldings, tail lights and both front and rear windscreens to enhance the focus on luxury rather than sportiness. The Prelude INX coincided with changes to North American lighting requirements in the United States and Canada, and a greater focus on safety was offered with available anti-lock brakes and optional driver's side airbag exclusively offered on the Si/SR/S models.

==== Prelude SiStates and Prelude SiTCV ====
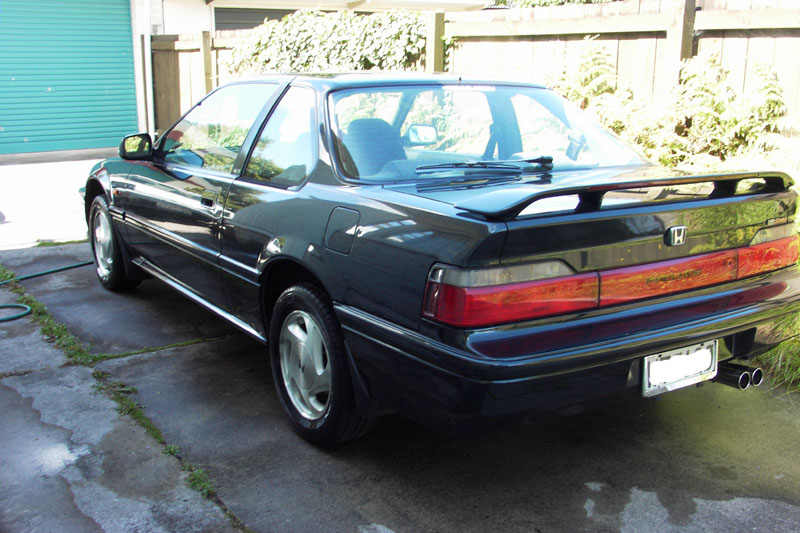
1990 Prelude SiStates (Japan)

Honda released two new special limited edition trim models in Japan in 1989 for the facelift Prelude, the Prelude SiStates and Prelude SiTCV. These cars were a limited production run and very few were built. SiStates catalogues indicate 3,000 built. They both featured standard 4WS, ALB, Viscous limited-slip differential (LSD) transmissions, TCS (SiTCV only), leather-wrapped steering wheel and gear lever, extra sound-deadening insulation on the firewall and hood, and many more features that were usually options. The SiStates also featured a Japanese version of the 2.1 liter B21A1 engine called the B21A rated at 150 PS (110 kW). Two major distinctions of the SiStates was that it was the same width as the Prelude sold in North America, from which it took its name, due to the wider side moldings. The other being that it was over 2.0 liters, a limitation in engine displacement in Japan for insurance reasons. The extra width and the larger engine combined to place the Prelude SiStates in a considerably higher road tax obligation; while this slowed sales it also targeted some status hungry buyers. The SiStates model was only available with the MY8A LSD equipped automatic transmission. The SiTCV model was available with the MY8A automatic or the D2M5 5-speed manual gearbox.

== Fourth generation (BA8/9/BB1/2/3/4; 1991) ==
Fourth generation
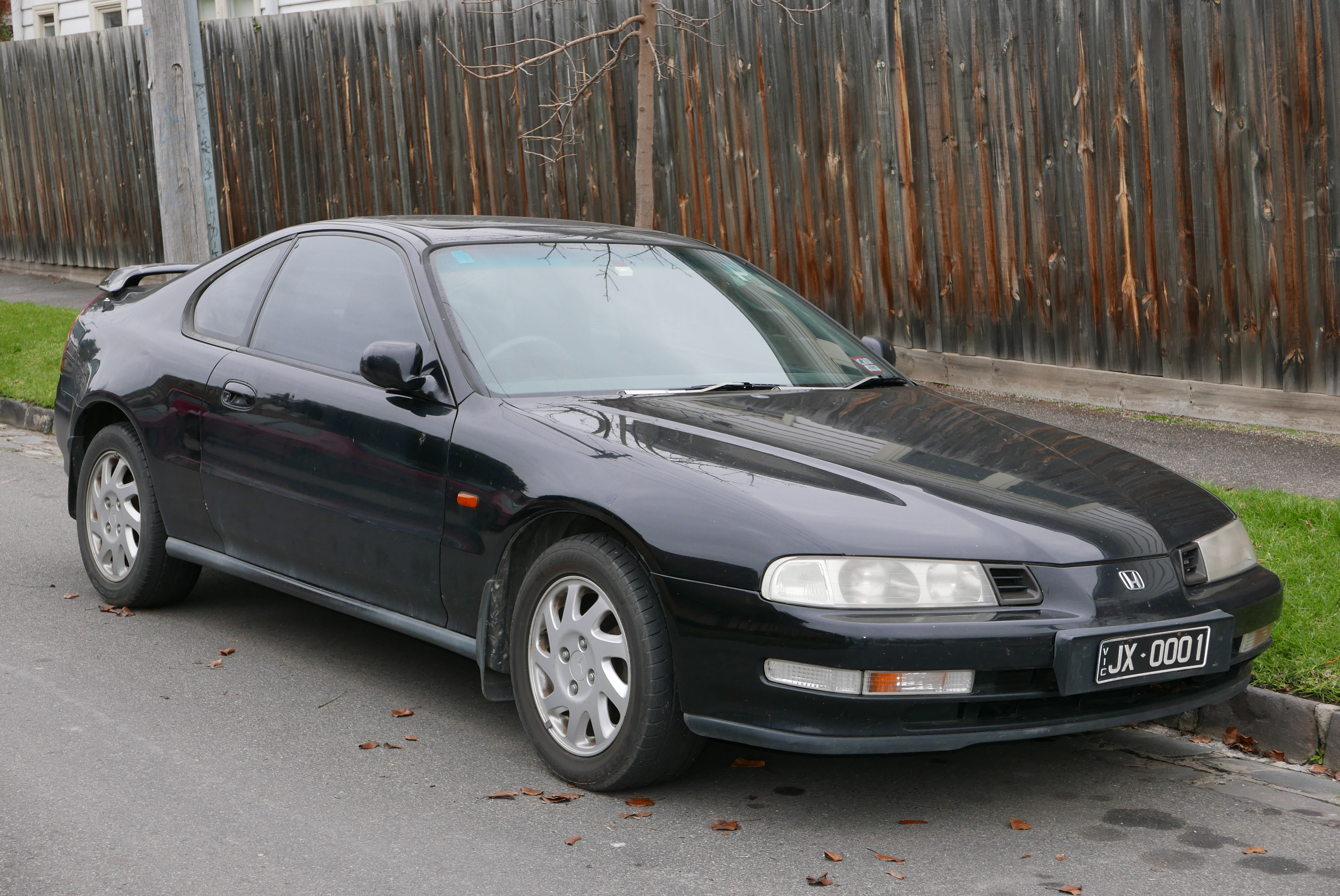
- Honda Prelude 2.3 Si (BB2, Australia)

Overview
- Model code: BA8/9, BB1/2/3/4
- Production: 1991–1996
- Designer: Yukio Kurosu (1989)

Body and chassis
- Body style: 2-door coupe

Powertrain
- Transmission: 4-speed automatic 5-speed manual

Dimensions
- Wheelbase: 2,550 mm (100.4 in)
- Length: 4,440 mm (174.8 in)
- Width: 1,765 mm (69.5 in)
- Height: 1,290 mm (50.8 in)
- Curb weight: 1,288 kg (2,840 lb)

On 19 September 1991, the fourth-generation Prelude was introduced in Japan, and in Europe from early 1992. The car had a 58% front and 42% rear weight distribution. The four-wheel steering system was changed to an electronic version and the 4-cylinder engine was increased in displacement from 2.1 liters to 2.2 liters for the base model "S" (SOHC F22A1 engine, 135 PS (99 kW; 133 hp) at 5,200 rpm, 203 N⋅m (150 ft⋅lbf) at 4,000 rpm) and "VTEC" model (DOHC VTEC H22A1, 190 PS (140 kW; 187 hp) at 6,800 rpm, 207 N⋅m (153 ft⋅lbf) at 5,500 rpm), with a 2.3-liter for the "Si" (DOHC H23A1, 160 PS (118 kW; 158 hp) at 5,800 rpm, 212 N⋅m (156 ft⋅lbf) at 5,300 rpm). The Japanese Si came with the F22B (2.2 L DOHC non-VTEC, 160 PS (118 kW; 158 hp)). The VTEC model had an upgraded brake system, going from a 10.3-inch (262 mm) front rotor to an 11.1-inch (282 mm) front rotor and utilizing larger brake caliper and pads, similar to those found in the Honda Vigor. Its styling approach is similar to the Honda Ascot Innova during the same time period.

Additionally, a 2.0i, single overhead cam (SOHC) model was released in Europe, rated at 133 PS (98 kW; 131 hp). 1993 was the last year that the "Si-VTEC" (BB4) name was used, and beginning in 1994 it was shortened to just "VTEC" and stayed that way throughout the rest of the generation. In some countries, the Prelude with 2.2 DOHC VTEC 4-cylinder engine was called the VTi-R. Later, the '96 prelude Si/SR was introduced with a 2.3 DOHC 4-cylinder engine. In Canada, the Si was called the SR, and the VTEC was called the SR-V. Due to the width dimensions and the engine displacement exceeding Japanese government regulations for vehicles classified as "compact", this generation Prelude obligated Japanese owners to yearly taxes.

This model also marked the end for the pop-up headlights. The 1992 Prelude incorporated other design features that had also become the "Prelude standard". The rear end was rounded and fairly high in comparison to the previous square trunk line. The front fascia of the car became wider with fixed headlights. The glass moonroof made way for a steel sliding sunroof which no longer retracted into the car but extended out and over it.

The light-blue back lighting introduced in the third generation was continued. Later models (1994 and on) also featured translucent speedometer and tachometer needles. All VTEC & SE models received leather interior. Also featured was an 8-speaker audio system (Gathers DSP 8-speaker System) which included a center dash-mounted speaker and rear center subwoofer, while the U.S. VTEC model received only 7 speakers (center dash speaker not included). U.S. S and Si models received a 6-speaker stereo (no subwoofer). The Japanese version also included a digital climate control system. The Canadian version received some options which were not available in the United States. For instance, the Japanese Prelude had power folding mirrors as well as a rear windscreen wiper, while the Canadian market was the one to have heated mirrors and optional heated seats. The Japanese model came with optional Honda Access accessories such as Typus ski racks, under dash lights, headrest covers, a cabin air filter, and floor mats. Some of the Japanese domestic market fourth-generation Prelude VTECs did not come with options such as a sunroof and 4-wheel steering, as it was possible to skip these options when buying in Japan. The fourth-generation Prelude also shares some suspension components with the fifth-generation (1994–97) Honda Accord.

=== Models and markets ===
Model	Engine			Steering	Chassis code	Markets				
Model	Code	C/R	Power	Steering	Chassis code	Japan	USA	Canada	Europe	Australia
Si	F22B	9.5:1	160 PS (118 kW; 158 hp)	2WS	BA8					
Si	F22B	9.5:1	160 PS (118 kW; 158 hp)	4WS	BA9					
Si VTEC	H22A	10.6:1	200 PS (147 kW; 197 hp)	2WS	BB4					
Si VTEC	H22A	10.6:1	200 PS (147 kW; 197 hp)	4WS	BB1					
S	F22A1	8.8:1	135 PS (99 kW; 133 hp)	2WS	BA8					
Si	H23A1	9.8:1	160 PS (118 kW; 158 hp)	2WS	BB2					
Si	H23A1	9.8:1	160 PS (118 kW; 158 hp)	4WS	BB2					
SE (1995)	H23A1	9.8:1	160 PS (118 kW; 158 hp)	2WS	BB2					
VTEC (93–96)	H22A1	10.0:1	190 PS (140 kW; 187 hp)	4WS	BB1					
Prelude	F22A1	8.8:1	133 PS (98 kW; 131 hp)	2WS	BA8					
SR	H23A1	9.8:1	160 PS (118 kW; 158 hp)	2WS	BB2					
SR	H23A1	9.8:1	160 PS (118 kW; 158 hp)	4WS	BB2					
SR-V (93–96)	H22A1	10.0:1	190 PS (140 kW; 187 hp)	2WS	BB1					
2.0i	F20A4	9.5:1	133 PS (98 kW; 131 hp)	2WS	BB3					
2.3i	H23A2	9.8:1	160 PS (118 kW; 158 hp)	2WS	BB2					
2.3i	H23A2	9.8:1	160 PS (118 kW; 158 hp)	4WS	BB2					
2.2i VTEC (93–96)	H22A2	10.0:1	185 PS (136 kW; 182 hp)	2WS	BB1					
2.2i VTEC (93–96)	H22A2	10.0:1	185 PS (136 kW; 182 hp)	4WS	BB1					
CV/S	F22A1	8.8:1	131 PS (96 kW; 129 hp)	2WS	BA8					
Si	H23A1	9.8:1	160 PS (118 kW; 158 hp)	4WS	BB2					
SRS (91–93)	H23A1	9.8:1	160 PS (118 kW; 158 hp)	4WS	BB2					
VTi-R (94–96)	H22A1	10.0:1	190 PS (140 kW; 187 hp)	4WS	BB1					

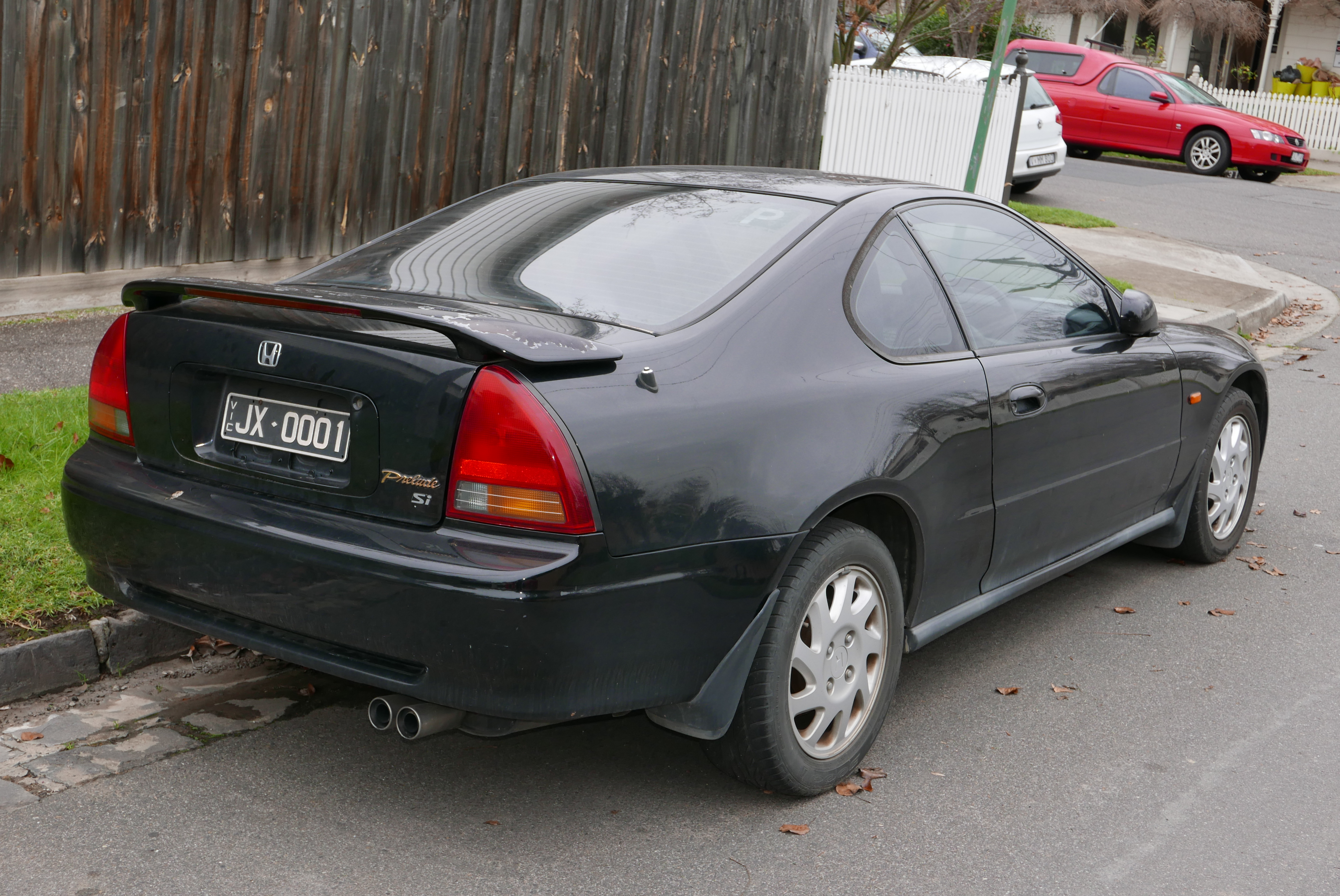
1996 Prelude Si (BB2, Australia)

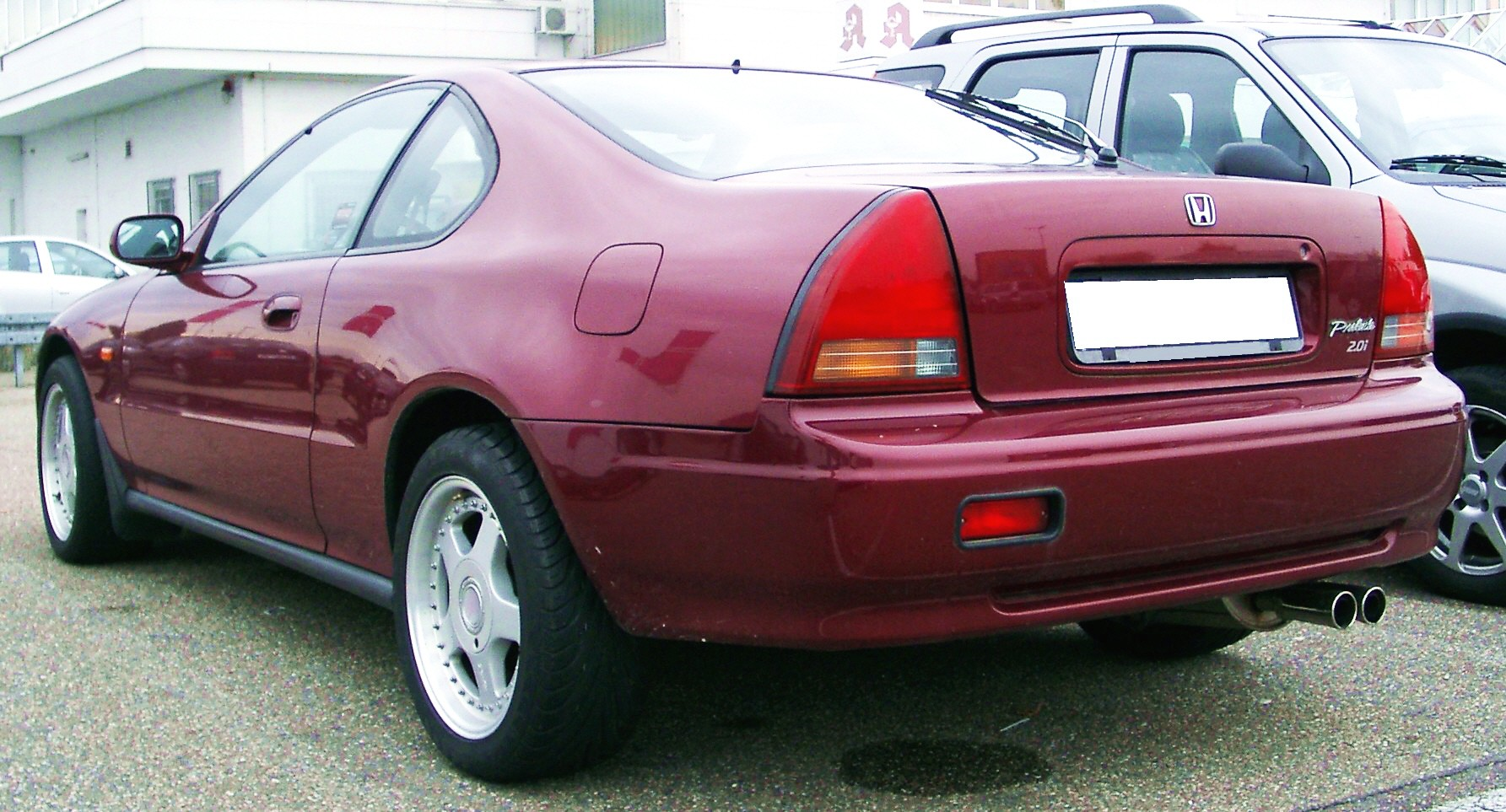
Honda Prelude 2.0i (BB3, Germany) with rear fog lamp.

=== Formula One safety car ===
The Prelude was used in Formula One as its safety car during the 1994 Japanese Grand Prix. It was also used once as a pace car, at the Suzuka International Racing Course in 1992.

== Fifth generation (BB5/6/7/8/9; 1996) ==
Fifth generation
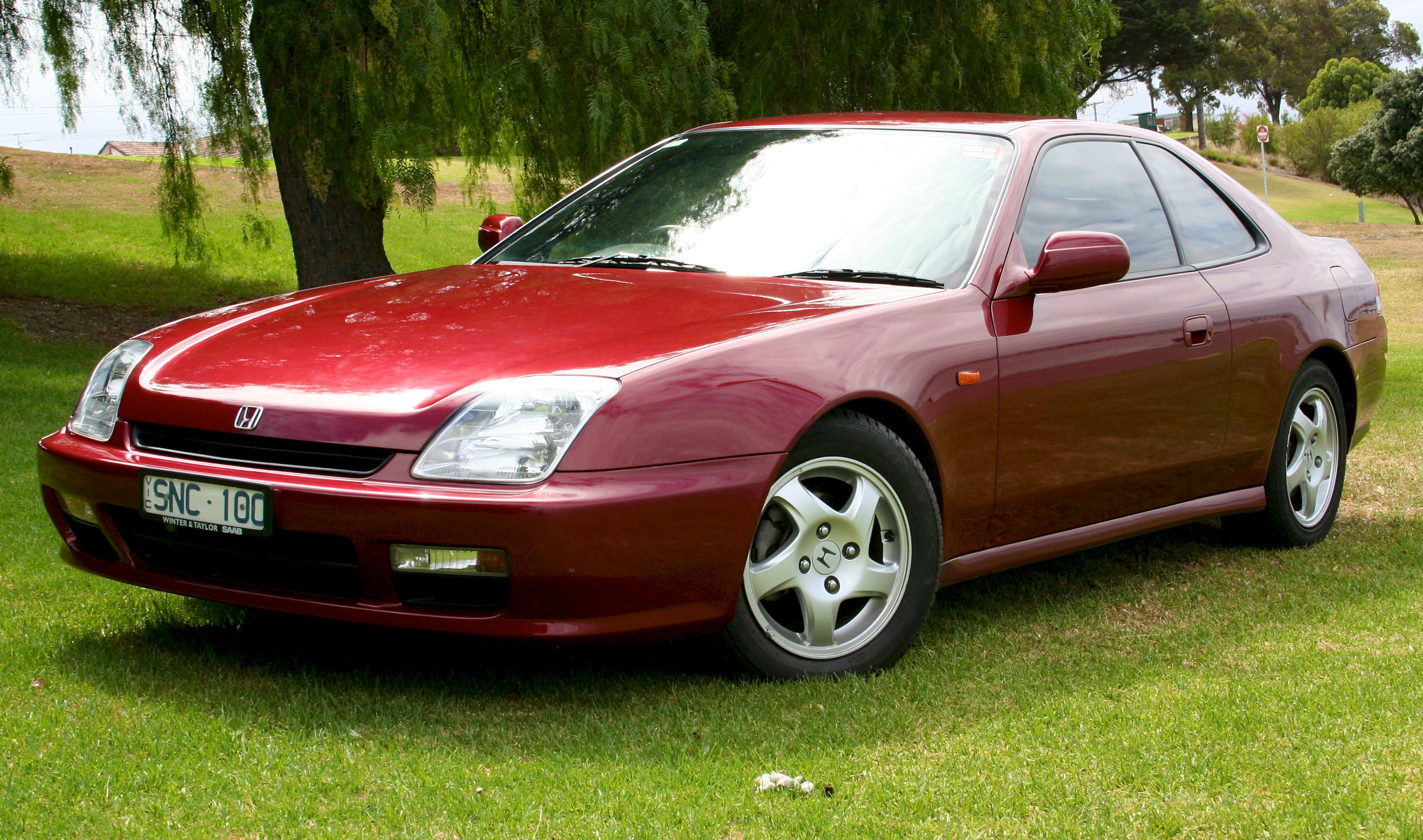
- 1997 Honda Prelude Si (BB5, Australia)

Overview
- Model code: BB5/6/7/8/9
- Production: November 1996 – October 2001
- Designer: Manabu Konaka (1993)

Body and chassis
- Body style: 2-door coupe

Powertrain
- Transmission: 4-speed automatic 5-speed manual

Dimensions
- Wheelbase: 2,585 mm (102 in)
- Length: 4,520 mm (178 in)
- Width: 1,750 mm (69 in)
- Height: 1,315 mm (52 in)
- Curb weight: 1,340 kg (2,954 lb) (Base); 1,380 kg (3,042 lb) (SH); 1,268 kg (2,795 lb) (vti-R) (au); 1,298 kg (2,862 lb) (auto)(jdm/au); 1,308 kg (2,883 lb) (ATTS) (au); 1,310 kg (2,888 lb) (Type-S) (jdm)

Chronology
- Successor: Honda Accord Coupe (seventh generation); Honda Integra (fourth generation)

Introduced on 7 November 1996, the fifth-generation Prelude retained an FWD layout with an independent front suspension. The fifth-generation Prelude marked a return to the more square bodystyle of the third generation (1987–1991), in an attempt to curb slumping sales of the fourth-generation bodystyle. The two-door notchback style is retained but the design is less aggressive and more angular than the previous generation. The redesigned sports coupe is slightly larger than its predecessor at 1.4 inches (36 mm) longer in wheelbase and 3.2 inches (81 mm) overall. Base curb weight increased by 145 pounds (66 kg) and interior dimensions are nearly identical, but trunk space expanded by nearly 1 cubic foot.

The ATTS model received Honda's Active Torque Transfer System; badged as the Type S in Japan, VTi-S in Europe, and Type SH ("Super Handling") in North America. ATTS automatically distributes more of the engine's power to the outside front wheel when accelerating in a turn. This forces the outside front wheel to rotate up to 15 percent faster than the inside wheel directing up to 80 percent of the torque to a single wheel. ATTS was designed to counteract the understeer inherent in a front-wheel drive car, but, according to reviewers, the Prelude's 63.1 percent front weight distribution was too much for the system to successfully mask.

The Prelude was available in three models for Canada and two models for the US (the Base and Type SH). All North American models came with a 195 hp (145 kW) (later increased to 200 hp) 2.2-liter DOHC VTEC 4-cylinder engine and 16-inch alloy wheels. The optional automatic transmission has a new manual-shift feature called Sequential SportShift. The gear lever can be left in Drive, which allows automatic shifting or it can be tipped forward or backward to allow manual shifting. A 5-speed manual transmission was standard. The Type SH was only available with a 5-speed manual transmission.

The 2.0i and JDM Si trims came with 195/60 R15 tires mounted on steel wheels, and the JDM Xi came with 14-inch steel wheels. Unlike the North American market Preludes, JDM Preludes came with rear windscreen wipers, except for the Xi. Australian and JDM Preludes weigh less than American and European models: VTi-R manual weighs 1,268 kg (2,795 lb), autos weigh 1,298 kg (2,862 lb), and the ATTS weighs 1,308 kg (2,884 lb).

Most fifth-generation Preludes came with 16-inch (410 mm) aluminum alloy wheels with all-season 205/50 R16 87V tires, featured the 11.1-inch front brakes with 5-lug hubs and anti-lock brakes are standard. US models were well equipped and the Type SH only added ATTS, a leather-wrapped shift knob, and a rear spoiler over the base model.

All models and trim packages stayed within the BB-chassis code (BB5-BB9) and housed either an H-series or F-Series engine:

Model	Engine			Steering	Chassis code	Markets				
Model	Code	C/R	Power	Steering	Chassis code	Japan	USA	Canada	Europe	Australia
Xi	F22B	8.8:1	135 PS (99 kW; 133 hp)	2WS	BB5					
Si	F22B	9.2:1	160 PS (118 kW; 158 hp)	2WS	BB5					
Si	F22B	9.2:1	160 PS (118 kW; 158 hp)	4WS	BB7					
SiR	H22A	10.6:1	200 PS (147 kW; 197 hp)	2WS	BB6					
SiR	H22A	10.6:1	200 PS (147 kW; 197 hp)	4WS	BB8					
SiR S-spec	H22A	11.0:1	220 PS (162 kW; 217 hp)	2WS	BB6					
Type S	H22A	11.0:1	220 PS (162 kW; 217 hp)	2WS	BB6					
Base	H22A4	10.0:1	200 hp (149 kW; 203 PS)	2WS	BB6					
Type SH	H22A4	10.0:1	200 hp (149 kW; 203 PS)	2WS	BB6					
SE	H22A4	10.0:1	195 hp (145 kW; 198 PS)	2WS	BB6					
2.0i	F20A4	9.5:1	133 PS (98 kW; 131 hp)	2WS	BB9					
2.2 VTi	H22A5 (97–98); H22A8 (99–01)	10.0:1; 11.0:1	185 PS (136 kW; 182 hp); 200 PS (147 kW; 197 hp)	2WS	BB6					
2.2 VTi	H22A5 (97–98); H22A8 (99–01)	10.0:1; 11.0:1	185 PS (136 kW; 182 hp); 200 PS (147 kW; 197 hp)	4WS	BB8					
2.2 VTi-S	H22A5 (97–98); H22A8 (99–01)	10.0:1; 11.0:1	185 PS (136 kW; 182 hp); 200 PS (147 kW; 197 hp)	2WS	BB6					
Si	F22Z6	10.0:1	160 PS (118 kW; 158 hp)	2WS	BB5					
VTi-R	H22A4 (97–98); H22Z1 (99–01)	10.0:1	203 PS (149 kW; 200 hp); 212 PS (156 kW; 209 hp)	2WS	BB6					
ATTS	H22A4 (97–98); H22Z1 (99–01)	10.0:1	203 PS (149 kW; 200 hp); 212 PS (156 kW; 209 hp)	2WS	BB6					

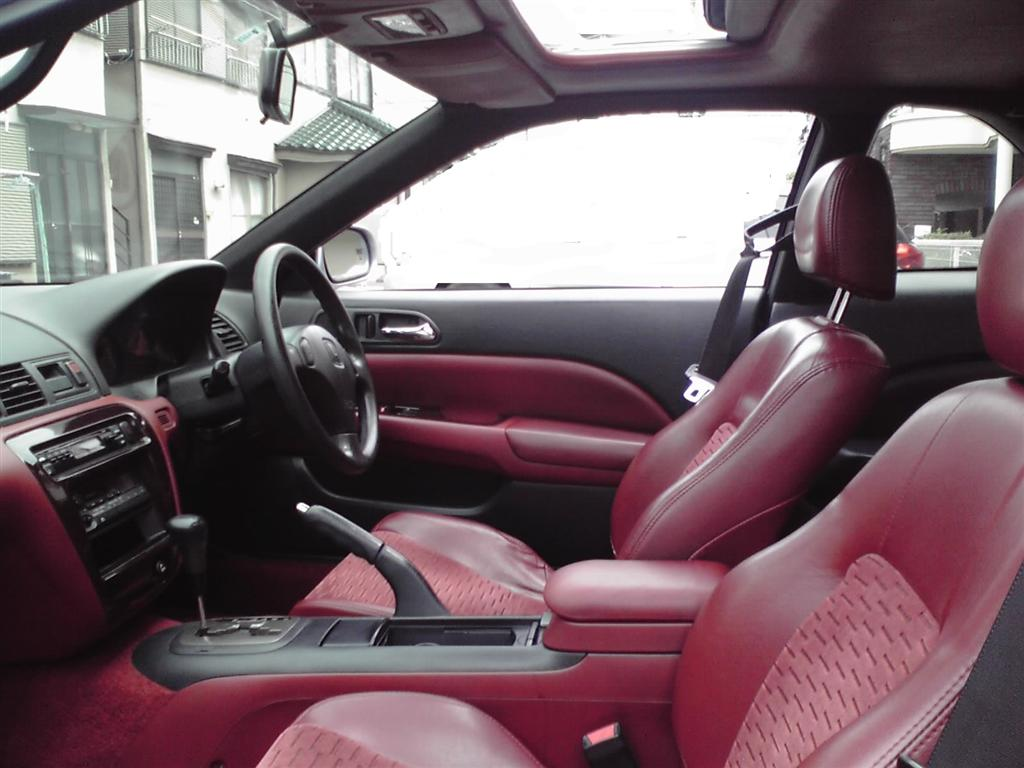
Interior

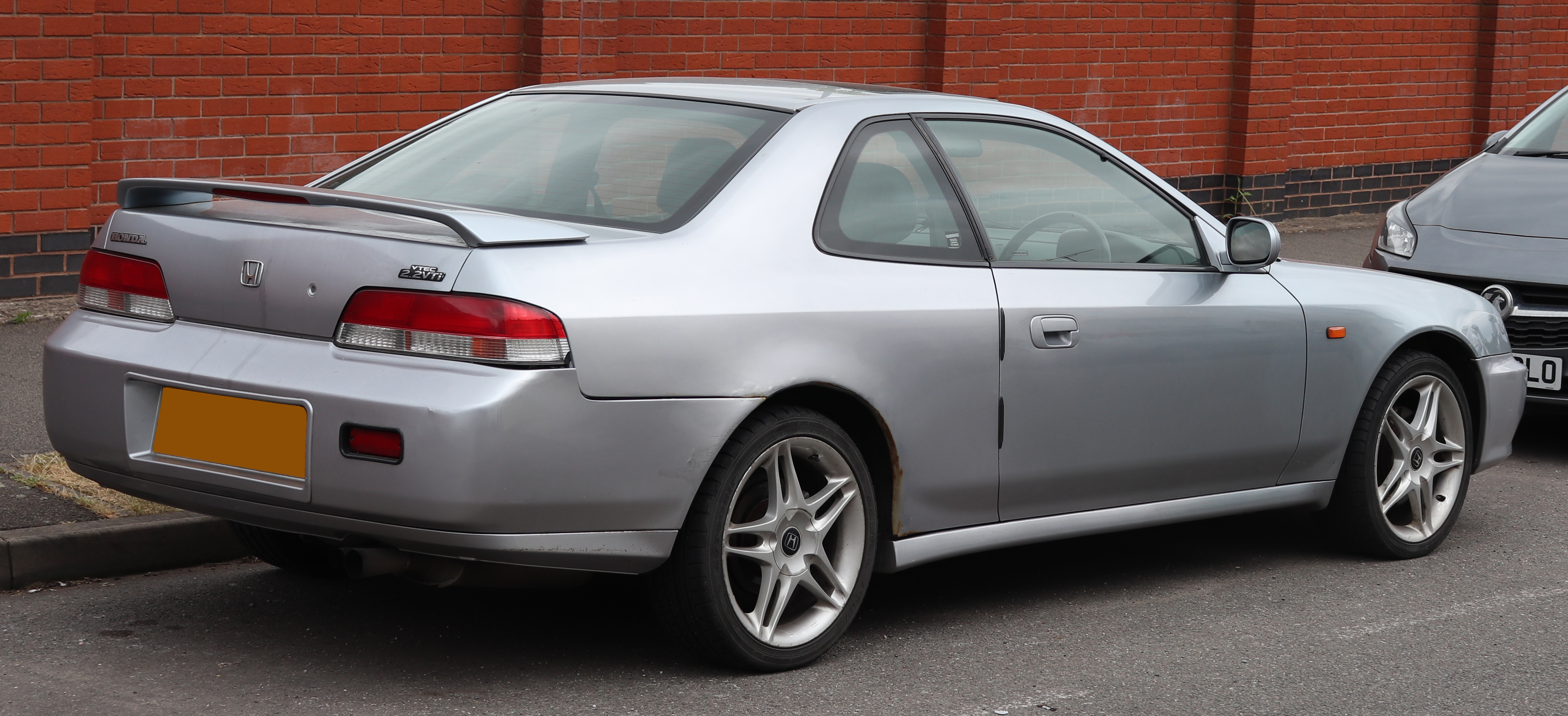
1998 Prelude VTi (BB6, UK) with rear fog lamp

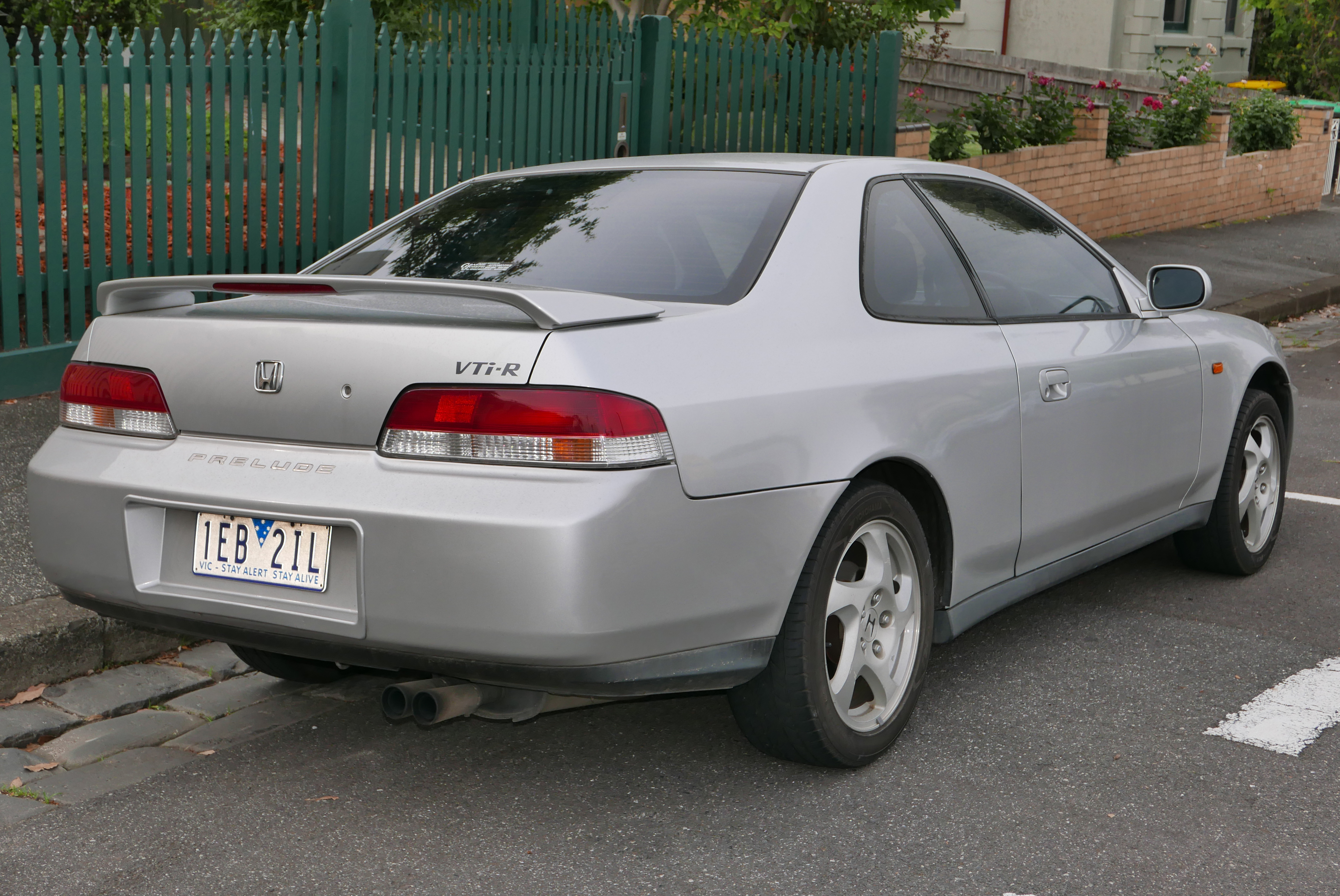
1999 Prelude VTi-R (BB6, Australia)

=== 1999 refresh ===
For the 1999 model year, the Prelude received a mid-cycle refresh; this included a 5 hp (4 kW) increase in power for manual (200 hp (149 kW) from 195 hp (145 kW)) and automatic (195 hp (145 kW) from 190 hp (142 kW)) transmission models, a new front grille featuring a small "Prelude" badge, an access door to the cabin air filtration system allowing for cabin air filter replacement without modifications, and changes to available colours.

=== Canadian market ===
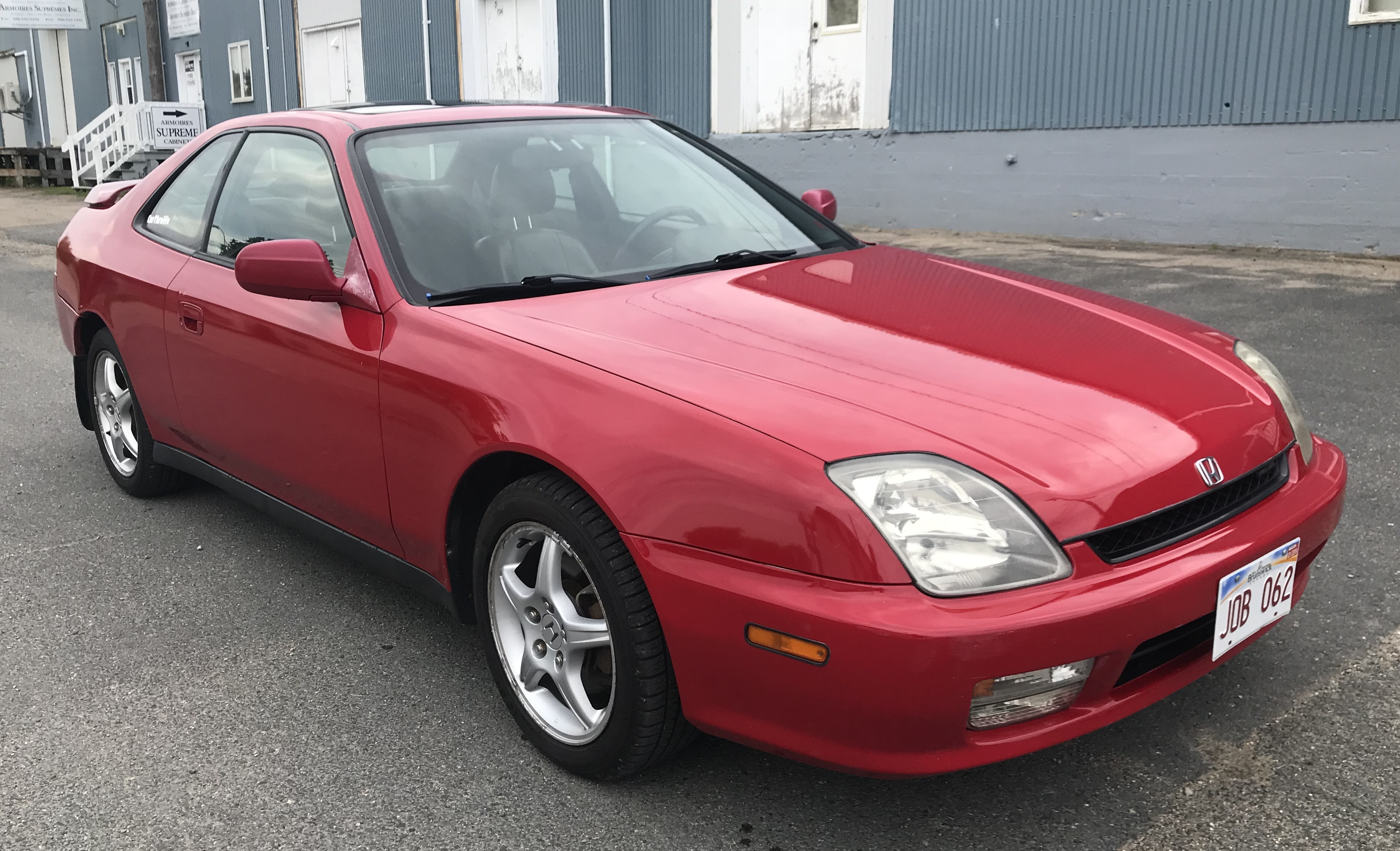
2001 Honda Prelude SE in Canada

Canadian-market Preludes were very similar to US models, although all were equipped with heated seats as standard equipment, and received a 4.5-liter washer fluid reservoir in place of the smaller 2.5-liter US spec. In 2001, Canada received a replacement for the Type SH, the SE trim level. The SE was mechanically identical to base models, but it came equipped with perforated, heated leather seats, Type SH Enkei rims, Type SH spoiler, a leather-wrapped shift knob, and simulated carbon fiber trim kit on the door panels and audio panel. The SE did not receive body-colored side skirts as standard like the Type SH, and also did not feature the active torque transfer system (ATTS). Dealer accessories for Canadian vehicles included: carbon fiber audio panel, sunroof visor, 6-disc-in-dash CD changer, trunk-mounted CD changer, cassette player, roof rack, gold-plated emblem kit, gold-plated exhaust finisher, leather-wrapped shift knob, full and half nose mask, security system, and a cargo mat.

=== Japanese-exclusive Type S ===
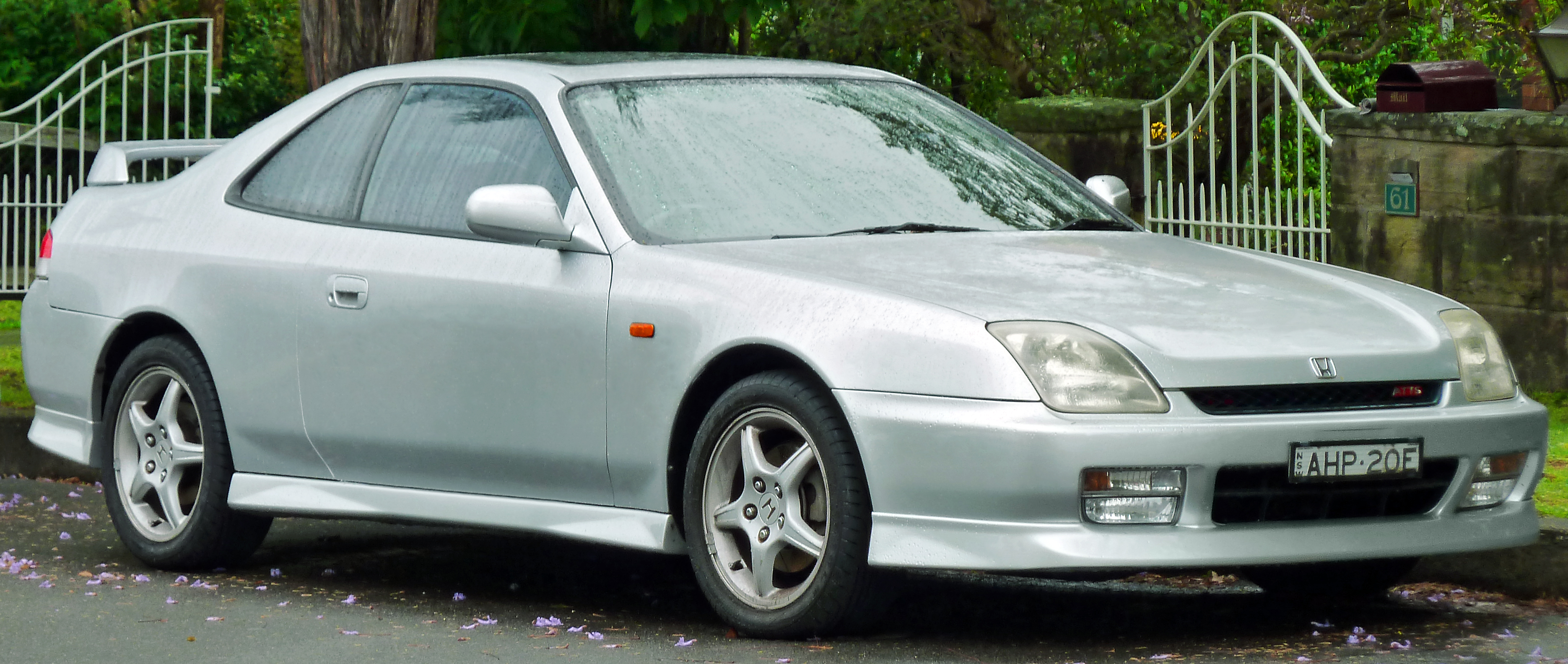

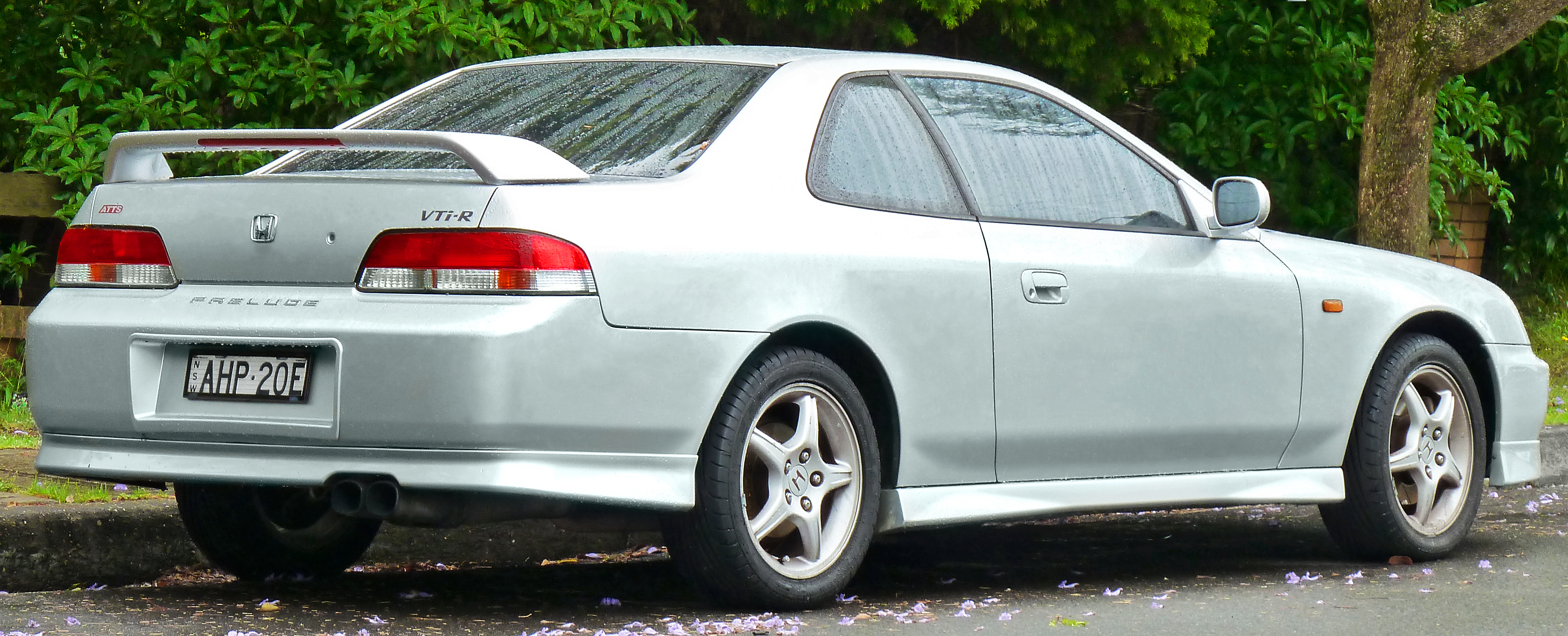
1997–2001 Honda Prelude VTi-R ATTS, Australia

One version of the fifth generation Prelude, a high-performance model called the Type S, was only available in Japan. It was equipped with the 2.2 L H22A, featuring VTEC and producing 220 PS (162 kW; 217 hp) at 7,200 rpm and 163 lbf·ft (221 N·m) at 6,500 rpm. With a compression ratio of 11.0:1, 87.0 mm (3.4 in) bore x 90.7 mm (3.6 in) stroke and VTEC-valve timing, lift and duration were adjusted to 12.2 mm (0.5 in) intake and 11.2 mm (0.4 in) exhaust. Honda also overhauled the air box and replaced it with a more efficient design that is often referred to as Dynamic Chambering, along with a larger throttle body design bored to 62 mm (as opposed to the previous 60 mm). The exhaust system was also treated to a redesign, with the pipe cross sections becoming more cylindrical rather than oval. The three-way catalytic converter was also increased in size, as well as the exhaust piping from 2 to 2 1/4 inches (51 to 57 mm) (tToV). In addition to a higher output engine Type S and like all ATTS equipped Preludes featured an overhauled front suspension layout which offered a more effective camber curve. The fifth generation curb weight was 1,310 kg (2,890 lb), and ground clearance was 140 mm (5.5 in).

The Type S, has an electronically controlled torque vectoring system attached to the manual transmission dubbed by Honda the Active Torque Transfer System (ATTS). The gearing on the Type S matches most other fifth-generation Preludes equipped with a manual transmission, excluding the five-speed 2.2 VTi VTEC which has a final drive ratio of 4.266:1. The Type S has an Active Control ABS system, different from the others which have the standard ABS systems. The interior featured newly developed synthetic materials called Cabron and Excene to upholster the seats which most people perceive as leather and Alcantara laced with red stitching. Manufacturer styling options included seat lettering. The exterior styling of fifth generation Preludes was standardized for most models. All had a sunroof, except for the Japanese Type S, Xi trim and some BB9s.

=== Prelude Motegi ===
Honda also released a special edition fifth-generation Prelude, called Motegi. The name of this special edition derives from the Twin Ring Motegi motor racing circuit, located in Haga District, Tochigi, Japan. This track was built in 1997 by Honda as part of their effort to bring the IndyCar series to Japan.

The Motegi edition Prelude featured an OEM Honda body kit, 17-inch Honda alloy wheels, lowered sports suspension and a Motegi badge on the trunk lid. All of these items, with the exception of the trunk lid badge, were optional on non-Motegi models.

== Sixth generation (BF1; 2025) ==
Sixth generation
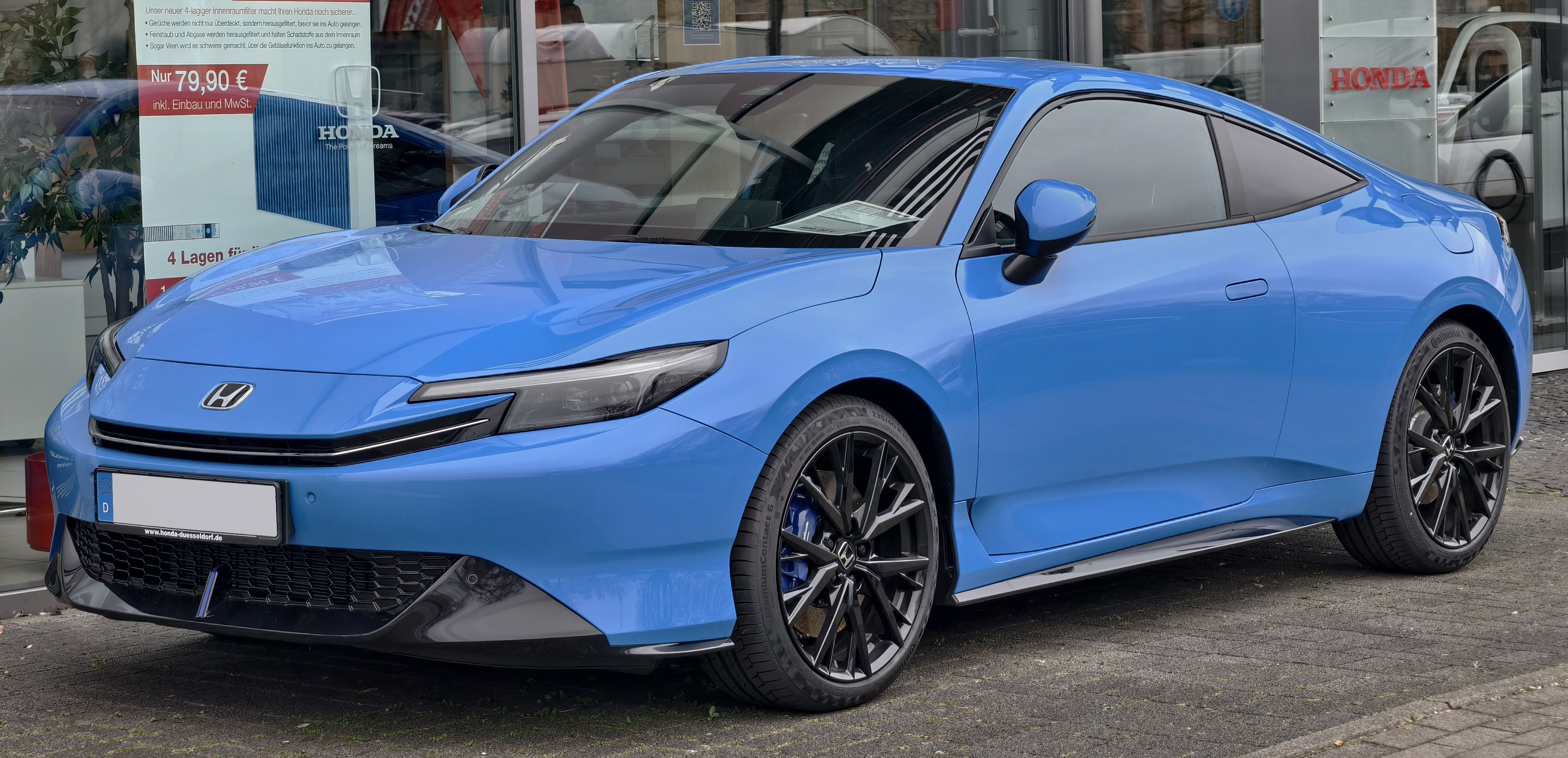
- 2025 Honda Prelude (BF1)

Overview
- Model code: BF1
- Production: August 2025 – present
- Designer: Norihito Ōnuma (exterior)

Body and chassis
- Body style: 3-door liftback coupe
- Related: Honda Civic (eleventh generation)

Powertrain
- Engine: Petrol hybrid: 2.0 L LFC-H4 I4
- Power output: 104 kW (139 hp; 141 PS) (LFC engine); 135 kW (181 hp; 184 PS) (H4 electric motor); 149 kW (200 hp; 203 PS) (combined system output)
- Transmission: Single Speed Direct Drive
- Hybrid drivetrain: Power-split hybrid
- Battery: 72-Ah lithium-ion

Dimensions
- Wheelbase: 2,605 mm (102.6 in)
- Length: 4,520 mm (178.0 in)
- Width: 1,880 mm (74.0 in)
- Height: 1,355 mm (53.3 in)
- Curb weight: 1,460 kg (3,219 lb)

The Prelude nameplate has been revived for a hybrid electric concept car, showcased at the 2023 Japan Mobility Show, and subsequently shown in North America at the Los Angeles Auto Show. Another example finished in red made its debut in July 2024 at the Goodwood Festival of Speed, where the Prelude was also confirmed for a European release. The revival of the Prelude nameplate is part of Honda's recent revival of old nameplates, such as Passport and Integra.

The BF1 Prelude serves as a replacement for the discontinued Civic and Accord coupes and was released in 2025. The model features a new drive mode, Honda S+ Shift, which allows the driver to use the steering-wheel-mounted paddle shifters to shift between 8 different simulated gear ratios. When S+ Shift is not engaged, the paddle shifters are used to control the level of regenerative braking. This is the first Prelude with liftback body shape, as the older generation models were 2-door coupe with notchback sedan-like trunk.

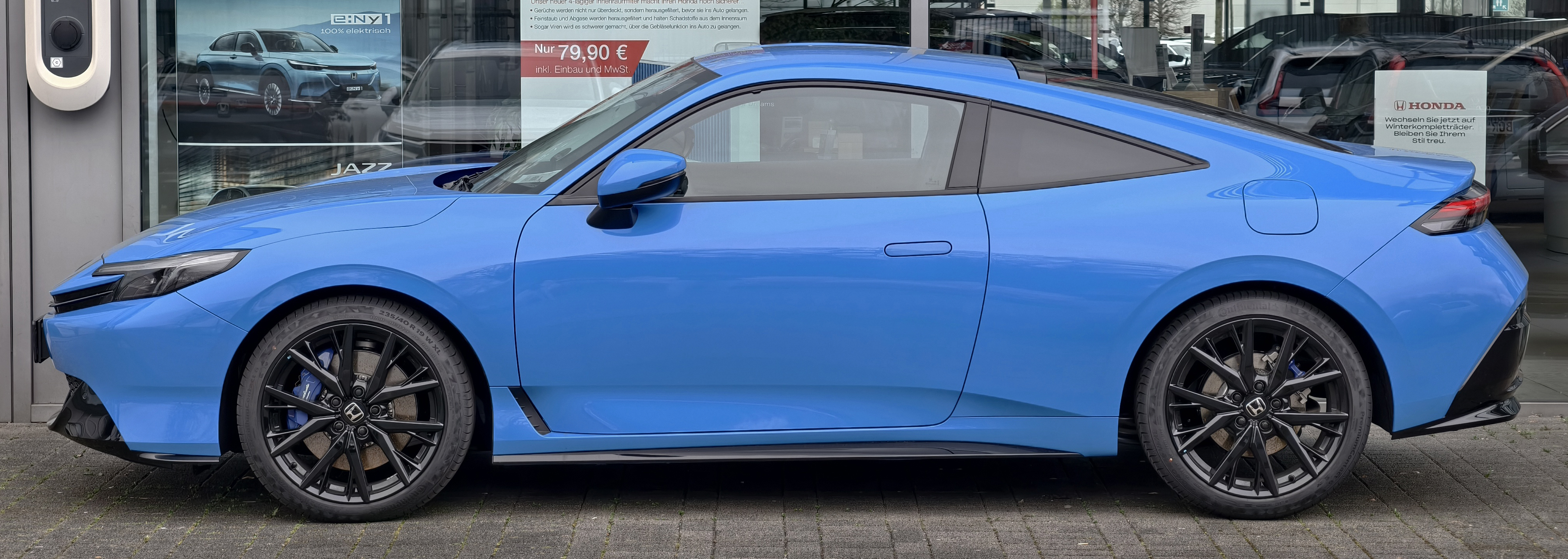
Side view

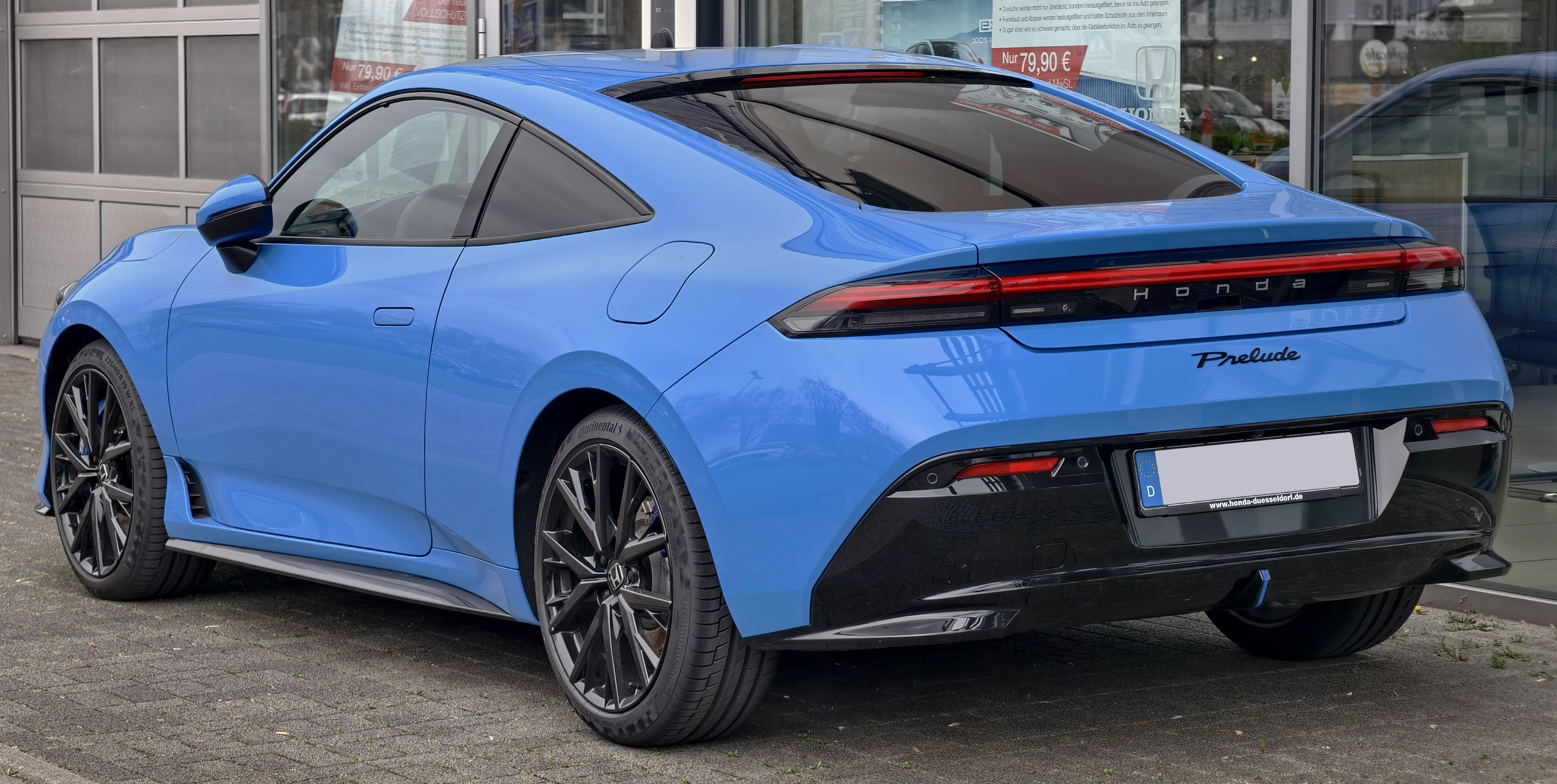
Rear view

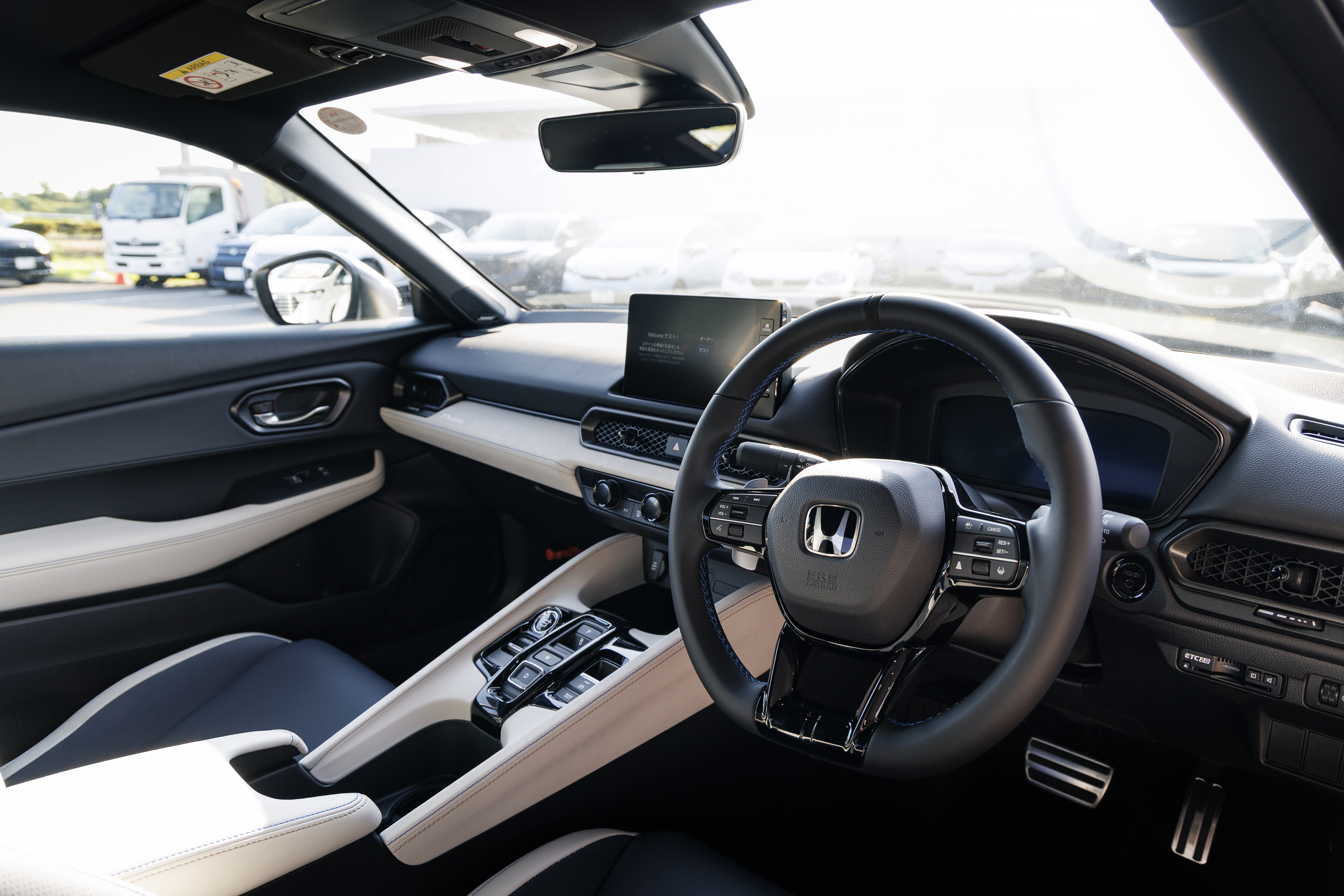
Interior

=== Markets ===
==== Americas ====
The sixth-generation Prelude was released in North America in November 2025. For the North American market, it is available in a single unnamed trim and no optional features available except for the exterior colours, interior upholstery and alloy wheel designs.

The sixth-generation Prelude was launched in Mexico on 17 March 2026, in a single unnamed trim.

==== Japan ====
Japanese models went on sale on 5 September 2025.

On 5 November 2025, the car received the 2025-2026 Japan Automotive Hall of Fame Car Design of the Year award.

At the 2026 Tokyo Auto Salon, Honda announced a special edition sixth-generation Prelude, called Mugen Prelude Spec III, with only 16 units planned to be built. They are fitted with 19-inch Mugen FR10 alloy wheels, Mugen brake pads, Mugen floor mats and boot lining, plus Mugen LED-illuminated door sills – all are also purchasable separately. The Recaro seats and steering wheel also feature Mugen logos.

==== Southeast Asia ====
The sixth-generation Prelude made its ASEAN debut in Indonesia and went on sale on 23 January 2026. Previously, this car was also exhibited at the 2025 Gaikindo Indonesia International Auto Show. The vehicle was launched in the Philippines on 17 April 2026, and in Malaysia on 11 June 2026.

== Motorsport ==
=== Super GT ===
Honda HRC Prelude-GT
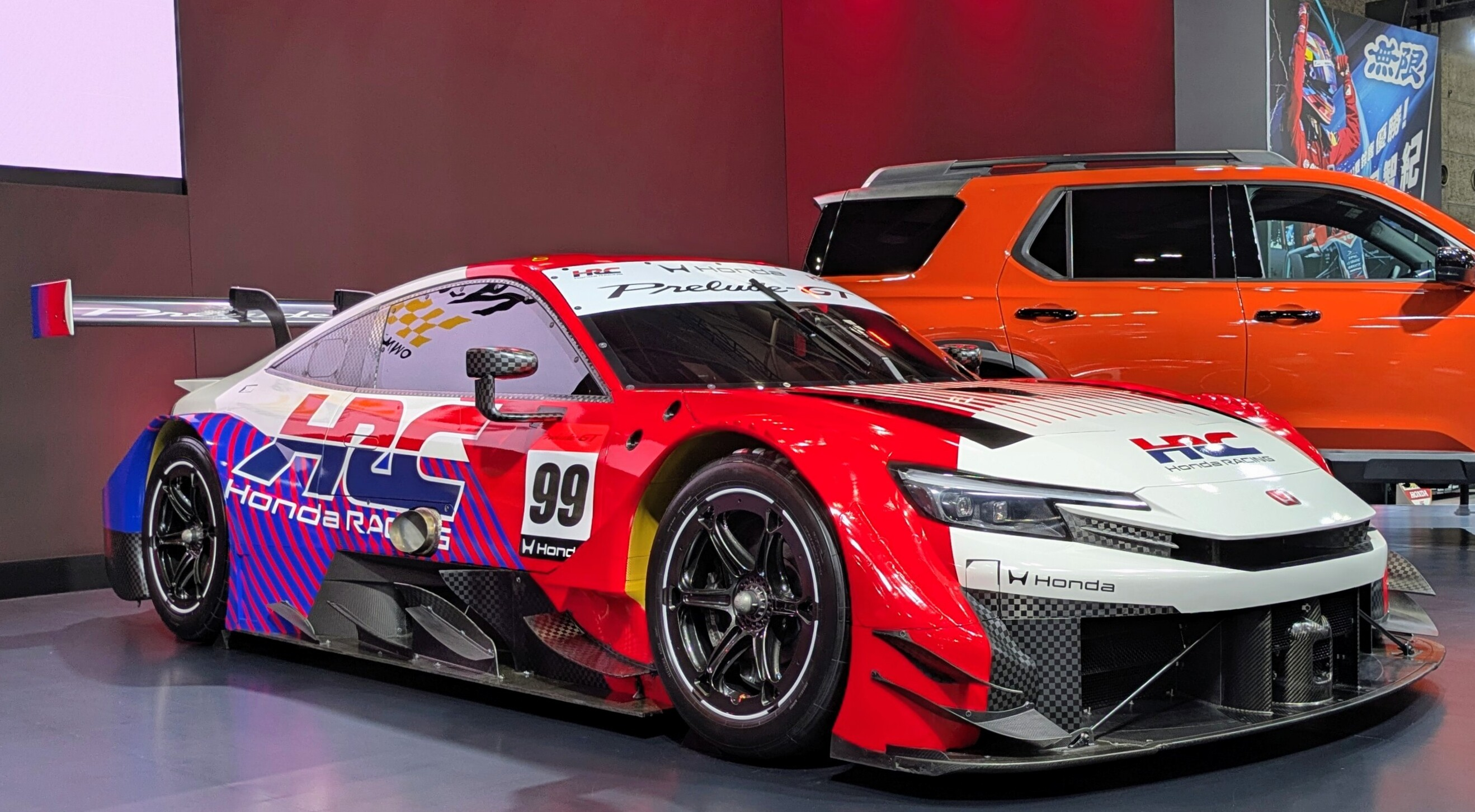
- The HRC Prelude-GT development vehicle at the 2026 Osaka Auto Messe
- Category: Super GT GT500
- Constructor: Honda
- Predecessor: Honda Civic Type R-GT

Technical specifications
- Chassis: Carbon-fibre monocoque
- Length: 4,725 mm (186 in)
- Width: 1,950 mm (77 in)
- Height: 1,150 mm (45 in)
- Wheelbase: Standard Class 1 2,750 mm (108 in)
- Engine: Honda HR-420E 1,995 cc (122 cu in) inline-4 single-turbocharged Front mid-engine, rear-wheel drive
- Transmission: 6-speed sequential semi-automatic gearbox
- Tyres: Bridgestone Potenza, Dunlop Direzza

Competition history
- Notable entrants: (Japan) ARTA Mugen (Japan) Astemo Real Racing (Japan) Modulo Nakajima Racing (Japan) Stanley Team Kunimitsu (Japan) Team HRC ARTA Mugen
- Notable drivers: (Brazil) Igor Omura Fraga (Japan) Tadasuke Makino (Japan) Tomoki Nojiri (Japan) Yuto Nomura (Japan) Kakunoshin Ohta (Japan) Riki Okusa (Japan) Hiroki Otsu (Japan) Ren Sato (Japan) Koudai Tsukakoshi (Japan) Naoki Yamamoto

The HRC Prelude-GT (built upon the silhouette of the sixth-generation Prelude) competes in the GT500 class of Super GT since 2026, replacing the underperforming Civic Type R-GT after two seasons.

== Sales ==
Sales weakened beginning with the third generation Prelude, particularly due to competition from Honda's other offerings. The sixth-generation Accord coupe received an exclusive front fascia, rear tail lights, wheels and many other body panels, now being marketed alongside the Prelude with shared brochures in Canada, yet its sedan roots gave it much more utility than the comparatively cramped Prelude, and the option of a V6 engine gave North American buyers an appealing alternative. The sixth-generation Civic Si coupe was considerably less expensive than the Prelude as well, while also providing better fuel economy ratings. The S2000 was another offering that while more expensive than the Prelude, offered rear wheel drive, a six-speed transmission, 40 extra horsepower, and a convertible top. The exterior dimensions of the Prelude were no longer in compliance with Japanese government regulations, and the additional costs resulting from this contributed to the popularity of smaller Honda products. US sales figures below.

Generation	Model years	Units
1st	1979–1982	171,829
2nd	1983–1987	336,599
3rd	1988–1991	160,909
4th	1992–1996	98,627
5th	1997–2001	58,118
1st-5th	1979–2001	826,082

Sixth-generation Prelude
Calendar Year	US
2025	204

== Safety ==
=== Australia ===
In Australia, the safety performance of Honda Preludes manufactured between 1983 and 2001 was assessed in the Buyers Guide to used Car Safety Ratings 2006, which was published by the Roads & Traffic Authority (a New South Wales, Australia, government agency). This publication concluded that the level of occupant protection in Preludes from 1983 to 1996 was at an "average" level, while in Preludes from 1997 to 2001 is "significantly better than average."

=== U.S. ===
The National Highway Traffic Safety Administration in the United States has determined frontal crash test ratings of Honda Preludes of different model years.

Model year	Make	Model	Type	Curb weight	Frontal driver rating	Frontal passenger rating
1980	Honda	Prelude	2-Door	2,545 lb (1,154 kg)		
1984	Honda	Prelude	2-Door	2,780 lb (1,261 kg)		
1990-91	Honda	Prelude	2-Door	2,659 lb (1,206 kg)		
1992-94	Honda	Prelude	2-Door	2,765 lb (1,254 kg)		

== Awards ==
The Prelude was on Car and Driver magazine's annual Ten Best list ten times: three times from 1984 to 1986, and then seven times from 1992 to 1998, although the biggest complaint over much of the Prelude's lifespan was the lack of availability of a V-6 engine option, especially in the US.

The sixth generation Prelude had won the 2025 Car Design of the Year at the Japan Automotive Hall of Fame.

== Convertibles ==
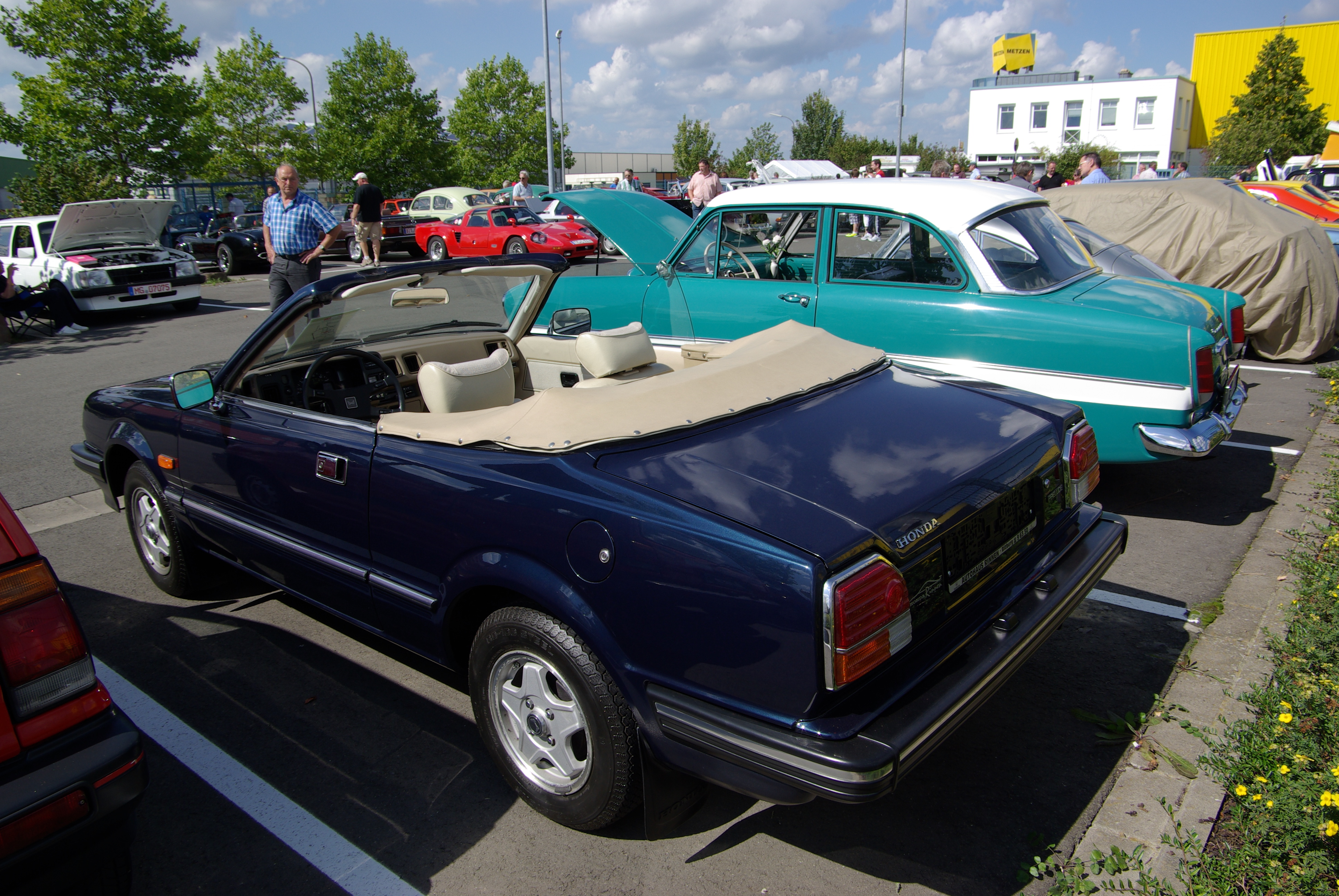
1981 Prelude Cabriolet (Tropic conversion)

Through the years, several German and US companies have converted Preludes into convertibles. There have been convertibles made from the first, second and fourth generation Preludes.

First-generation Preludes were modified into full convertibles by several companies in the US, Canada and Germany. The Solaire Corporation, a company in Santa Ana California owned by Al Rowland & Jim Bruemmer, led the idea for mass market sales. He brought in craftsman Bruce Meyers (Known for the famous Meyers Manx Dune Buggy) to help design the tooling and fiberglass work for production. Its believed that between 1980 - 1982, 250 Preludes were modified into convertibles and sold to US Honda dealerships with full factory warranties. Dealer prices ranged from $14,000-$15,000, while the conversion itself sold for around $5,000. Solaire collaborated with other companies including Classic Touch, Con-tec, Silcco, Steas Industries and National Coach. It was marketed as "Honda's 450 SL", drawing aesthetic comparisons to the Mercedes 450SL.

Tropic Design, located in Crailsheim, Germany also converted Preludes into convertibles. Company owner Jürgen Weber learned this trade in the United States. In total, they modified 47 Preludes. Very few have remained in Europe, initially all in Germany. Some have been sold over time to nearby countries, at least one to the Netherlands, one to France and one to Belgium.

Second-generation Preludes were modified by another German company; some 100 Preludes were modified. No DOHC engine-equipped models have been known to be converted into convertibles, however. Three versions were available: a basic version, one which had more luxurious options, and one which added a body kit.

There is believed to be a few third-generation Preludes made however it is not confirmed how many were made. There is currently one confirmed Japanese imported third generation convertible Prelude currently in Australia though not much is known of its history.

Of the fourth-generation Preludes, only some 15 were modified into a convertible by German company Honda-Autohaus Manfred Ernst. No details are known about the engine types and other specifics. Since only 15 were ever made, they are assumed by many to be custom-built.
