= 1984 Australian GT Championship =

Motor racing competition

Seasons
- ← 1983 1985 →

The 1984 Australian GT Championship was an CAMS sanctioned Australian motor racing title and was the seventh Australian GT Championship to be awarded. It was a series open to grand tourer cars complying with CAMS Group D regulations with Group B Sports Sedans competing by invitation. The series was contested over six rounds from 15 April to 9 September 1984.

Some of the cars that competed in the series included the Chevrolet Monza, Jaguar XJ-S, Porsche Carrera RSR, Mercedes-Benz 450 SLC, Alfa Romeo Alfetta GTV, Porsche 935, BMW 318i Turbo, Holden Commodore and Holden Monaro and Ford Falcon. Other than the 5.6 L V12 Jaguar, the turbo Porsche 935 and BMW 318i and the 3.2 L Flat-6 Porsche RSR, most of the top cars were powered by 5.0 L or 6.0 L Chevrolet V8 engines, though Bryan Thompson's Mercedes was powered by a twin turbo 4.2 L Chevrolet V8.

Australian Touring Car Championship and Bathurst 1000 regular Allan Grice (probably the only full-time professional driver in the field), won the series driving the ex-Bob Jane 6.0 L Chevrolet Monza from Queenslander Mark Trenoweth driving the ex-John McCormack Jaguar XJ-S and Series Production ace Peter Fitzgerald in his Porsche Carrera RSR. Fitzgerald, the only driver other than Grice to win a race in the championship*, did not enter the first two races of the series at Lakeside and Adelaide, thus his win at Calder was his first points for the season. Going into the last round of the series at the then new 3.9 km (2.4 mi) International circuit at Sandown, only Grice and Trenoweth could win the championship, but with the Sydney based driver winning both heats and the Queenslander only finishing 4th and 3rd, the title was Grice's. It was Grice's third (and ultimately last) national title win after also capturing the 1978 and 1979 Australian Sports Sedan Championships (the SS Championship was merged into the GT Championship in 1982). The expected challenge from dual Australian Sports Sedan champion Tony Edmonson in the Don Elliot owned Alfa Romeo Alfetta GTV Chevrolet (upgraded from 5.0 to 6.0 L) was hamstrung by reliability problems with the Chevrolet V8. On occasion Edmonson showed the speed to match Grice and indeed set the category lap record at Winton (which still stands as of 2016) while leading Grice in the first heat, but he rarely finished a race due to engine dramas.

Despite his final winning margin being only 12.5 points, Grice and the Monza dominated the series. He sat on pole position for every round, his biggest pole margin over the field being a full 4 seconds at Sandown, and not only did he win all bar one race in the championship he also set the fastest lap for every race except for the first heat in the first round at Lakeside and the first heat of the last round at Sandown. Bryan Thompson in his Mercedes-Benz 450 SLC Chev V8 was credited with the fastest race lap in both races (the Mercedes reportedly had over 900 bhp (671 kW; 912 PS) compared to the Monza's 650 bhp (485 kW; 659 PS), but was not as reliable, often retiring with turbo failure).

* Fitzgerald won at Calder after race leader Grice retired with just over a lap remaining with no fuel pressure. Grice held an eight second lead at the time of his retirement. Bryan Thompson suffered turbocharger failure in the Mercedes-Benz on the warmup lap and took over Tino Leo's Holden Monaro to finish 9th.

== Schedule ==
Round	Circuit	Date	Format	Race winners	Round winner	Car	Report
1	Lakeside International Raceway	15 April	One race	Allan Grice	Allan Grice	Chevrolet Monza	
2	Adelaide International Raceway	6 May	Two heats	Allan Grice; Allan Grice	Allan Grice	Chevrolet Monza	
3	Calder Park Raceway	29 July	One race	Peter Fitzgerald	Peter Fitzgerald	Porsche Carrera RSR	
4	Winton Motor Raceway	12 August	Two heats	Allan Grice; Allan Grice	Allan Grice	Chevrolet Monza	
5	Surfers Paradise Raceway	26 August	Two heats	Allan Grice; Allan Grice	Allan Grice	Chevrolet Monza	
6	Sandown Raceway	9 September	Two heats	Allan Grice; Allan Grice	Allan Grice	Chevrolet Monza	

== Results ==
Points were awarded on a 30-27-24-21-19-17-15-14-13-12 basis to the top ten outright finishers in each round. For rounds that featured two heats, the points were halved for each heat. All scores counted towards the championship.

Only the top 20 drivers are listed.

Pos	Driver	No.	Car	Entrant	Rd 1	Rd 2	Rd 3	Rd 4	Rd 5	Rd 6	Total
1	Allan Grice	4	Chevrolet Monza	Re-Car Racing	30	30	-	30	30	30	150
2	Mark Trenoweth	8	Jaguar XJ-S	Mark Trenoweth/Jaguar Racing	24	25.5	19	21	25.5	22.5	137.5
3	Peter Fitzgerald	3	Porsche Carrera RSR	Peter Fitzgerald/Stanilite Electronics	-	-	30	27	21	25.5	103.5
4	Bryan Thomson	17; 86	Mercedes-Benz 450 SLC-Chevrolet; Holden Monaro HQ	Thomson-Fowler Motorsport; Tino Leo	27	13.5	13	12	-	13.5	79
5	John Bourke	77	Toyota Celica Turbo	Biran Hilton Toyota	21	-	17	-	19	-	57
6	Bob Jolly	31	Holden Commodore	Bob Jolly	-	21.5	21	12	-	-	54.5
7	Robin Doherty	18	Holden Torana LX Hatchback	Robin Doherty	-	6.5	24	15.5	-	-	46
8	Jeff Barnes	3 & 6	Chevrolet Monza	Lithgow VHS Video	-	20	-	-	25.5	-	45.5
9	Doug Clark	78	Toyota Celica	Brian Hilton Toyota	19	-	-	-	16	-	35
10	Mick Monterosso	2	Ford Escort Mk I	Garry Sloper	-	17	-	17.5	-	-	34.5
11	Tino Leo	86	Holden Monaro HQ	Tino Leo	-	17	-	16	-	-	34
12	Tony Hubbard	15	Ford Falcon XC Hardtop	Scandia Heaters	-	-	27	-	-	-	27
13	Cos Monterosso	69	Ford Escort Mk II		-	-	15	7	-	-	22
13	Ray Ellis	38	Holden Torana		-	-	-	6	-	16	22
15	John Chambers	91	Holden Gemini		-	-	12	6	-		18
16	Gerry Bezett	74	Holden Commodore SS		17	-	-	-	-	-	27
17	Simon Harrex	49	Holden Commodore SS		-	-	-	-	15.5	-	15.5
18	Bonny Cameron	110	Holden Torana LC		15	-	-	-	-	-	15
19	Larry Kogge	41	Mazda R100		-	-	-	7.5	-	7	14.5
19	Luigi Deluca	22	Ford Anglia	DWU Australia	-	14.5	-	-	-	-	14.5
