= Lakeside International Raceway =

Motor racing circuit in Kurwongbah, Australia

Lakeside Park
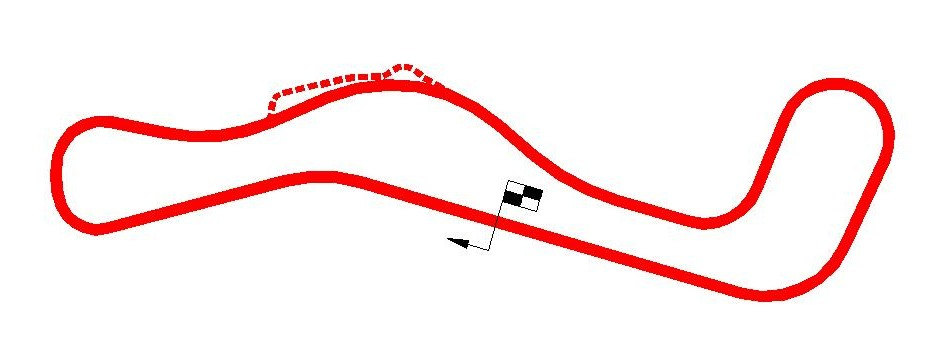
- Full Circuit (1961–2001, 2008–present)
- Location: Kurwongbah, City of Moreton Bay, Queensland
- Coordinates: 27°13′41″S 152°57′54″E
- Owner: Moreton Bay City Council
- Operator: Queensland Raceways
- Broke ground: 1959
- Opened: 19 March 1961; 65 years ago Reopened: 5 April 2008; 18 years ago
- Closed: 2001
- Former names: Lakeside International Raceway; Lakeside Raceway
- Major events: Former: Australian Touring Car Championship; Lakeside ATCC round (1964, 1967, 1970–1971, 1975–1998); Tasman Series (1964–1967, 1969); Australian Grand Prix (1966, 1969); Australian GT (1962, 1982–1985); Australian Drivers' Championship (1963–1968, 1970–1971, 1980, 1982–1985, 1988, 1993–1994); Australian Super Touring Championship (1993–2000); Australian Superbike Championship (1983–1998); Australian Formula 2 (1970–1972, 1974, 1985–1988)

Full Circuit (1961–2001, 2008–present)
- Length: 2.410 km (1.498 mi)
- Turns: 8
- Race lap record: 0:46.66 ( (Australia) Paul Stokell, Reynard 91D, 1994, Formula Holden)

Lakeside Park, formerly known as Lakeside International Raceway is a motor racing circuit located in Kurwongbah, City of Moreton Bay, Queensland, Australia. It is 30-kilometre (19 mi) north of Brisbane, and lies adjacent to Lake Kurwongbah.

The circuit was known as the spiritual home of Queensland motorsport and was built by volunteers and borrowed machinery in the 1960s. The 2.410 km (1.498 mi) circuit opened on 19 March 1961 and was closed in mid-2001. The circuit reopened on 5 April 2008, with a race meeting held the following day.

== History ==
Lakeside was built between 1959 and 1960 by the Queensland Motor Sporting Club. The opening meeting was staged on Sunday 19 March 1961, and the first international meeting was held the following year, with the feature race won by Jack Brabham in a Cooper-Climax. The circuit was the venue for a wide range of racing series including the Australian Grand Prix on two occasions, the Australian Touring Car Championship, the Australian Superbike Championship and the Tasman Series, playing host to such names as Jim Clark, Jackie Stewart, Jack Brabham, Graham Hill and Chris Amon.

The fast and challenging nature of the circuit contributed to the development of several Queensland racing drivers and riders, including: John French, Dick Johnson, Gregg Hansford, Tony Longhurst, Will Power and five time 500cc Grand Prix motorcycle road racing world champion Mick Doohan.

"If you can learn to race a motorbike at Lakeside, you can compete at any race track in the world."

— Mick Doohan, 5 time 500cc Motorcycle Grand Prix World Champion.

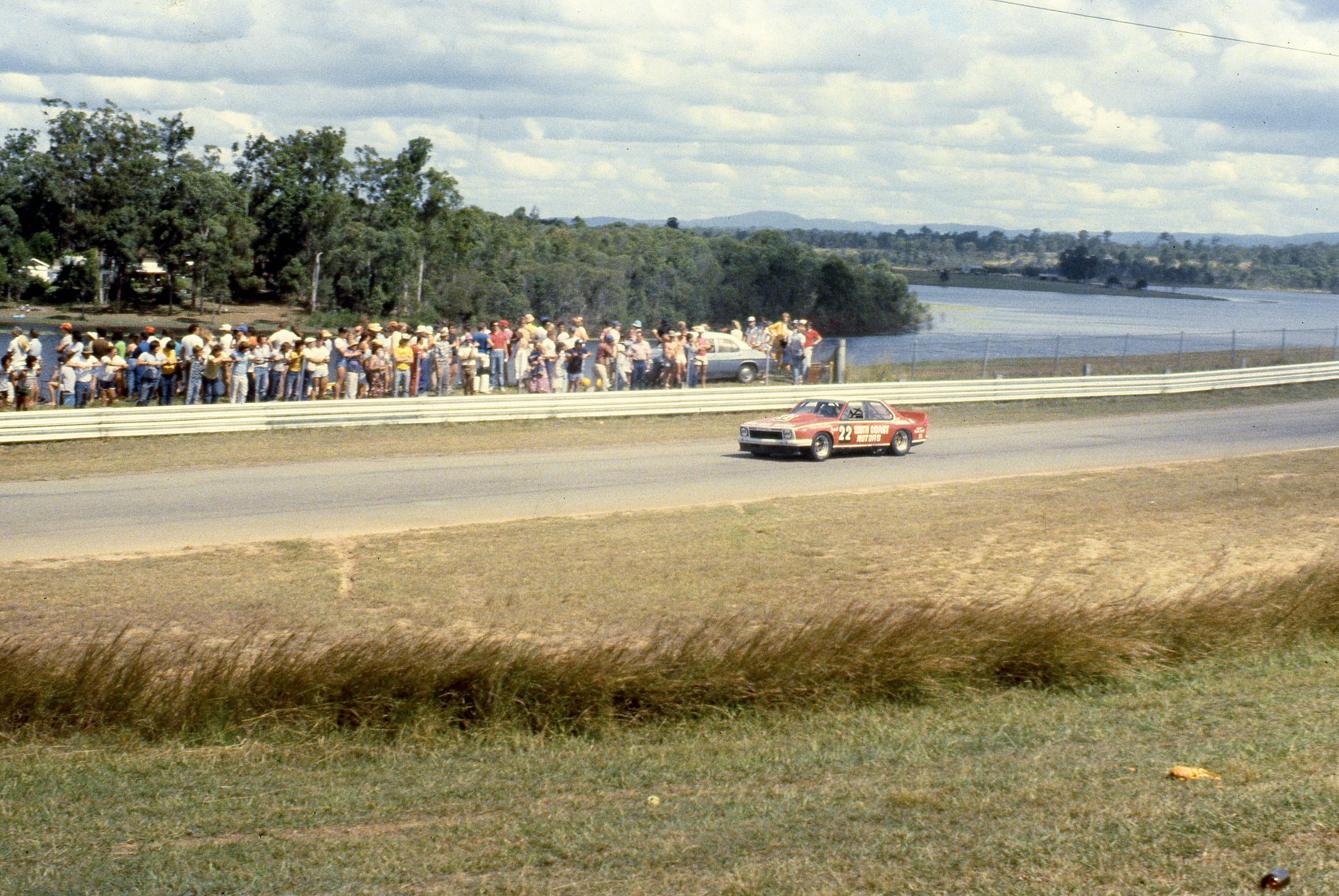
Spectators watching Round 1 of the 1981 Australian Sports Sedan Championship

Touring cars were a mainstay of the circuit's popularity, with the venue hosting the single race Australian Touring Car Championship titles in both 1964 and 1967. Following the change to a series format, Lakeside staged rounds of the ATCC in most years from 1970 to 1998. For much of the circuit's life these meetings were the largest of the year and played host to some brilliant racing, the highlight of which was the 1981 title showdown between local hero Dick Johnson and reigning champion Peter Brock. Despite a wounded car Johnson won the race and the title in front of his home crowd and secured for himself a future in the sport after almost 20 years of battling at times just to compete. Touring cars left Lakeside after the 1998 season, increasing the circuits decline as a venue.

=== 2001 closure ===
Although national championship racing was still being held at the circuit in July 2001 declining revenues, mounting debts, court proceedings, an increasingly hostile local council and competition for event with the nearby Queensland Raceway led to the circuit's closure in 2001.

=== Revival campaign ===
During the seven years the circuit was closed, several organisations and activist groups made up of competitors, fans and driver training advocates have campaigned to have the circuit reopen.

'Friends of Lakeside', led by Robert Hardacre and Trevor 'Shelby' Beutel compiled much data relating to the history of Lakeside and were able to initially have the circuit listed on the Queensland Heritage Register, which is the main reason why the local council were prevented from demolishing the track and facilities. Friends of Lakeside is a small group with the aims of preserving Lakeside as the home of historic and modern era motorsport for all.

'Lakeside Motor Racing Enthusiasts' is composed of both car and motorcycle aficionados from 17 to 70 years old who come from various motoring fraternities and niches.

=== 2008 reopening ===
On 18 December 2007, Pine Rivers Shire Council and Queensland Raceway (Wrexmere Pty Ltd) signed off on a 30-year-long-term lease (with an option for 10 years) to operate the facility, including both driver training and racing. Racing was limited by noise (95db) and time constraints as a means of ensuring neighbourhood management.

The circuit reopened during 2008 strictly as a local racing venue, and the new operators, the owners of Queensland Raceway, have no ambitions to hold national level meetings, preferring to use the better quality facilities at their sister-circuit for higher level meetings. Lakeside was closed during the summer of 2008/2009 while QR staff and volunteers refurbished and widened the circuit.

During the refurbishment a tunnel was also added underneath the circuit just before the foot bridge. The circuit is now 12m wide on the exit of Shell Corner, previously it was 8m wide at this point. The Bus Stop was not resurfaced, and neither was a short stretch between Hungry and Eastern Loop. The majority of the bumps were removed during the resurfacing. Further upgrades following these works in 2011 involved removing the Armco barriers on the inside of the track on the exit of Karousel. A sand trap was added and the runoff area increased and concrete barriers installed. The track reopened after the refurbishment in early 2009 and has remained open since, although its ongoing operation is under threat due to repeated breaches of the venues' 70 dB noise restrictions.

== Major race results ==
=== Australian Grand Prix ===
Lakeside hosted the Australian Grand Prix in 1966 and again in 1969. These two races also formed part of the Tasman Series.

Year	Winner	Car	Team
1966	(United Kingdom) Graham Hill	BRM P261	Owen Racing Organisation
1969	(New Zealand) Chris Amon	Ferrari 246T	Scuderia Veloce

=== Tasman Series ===
Along with the AGP in 1966 and 1969, Lakeside hosted a round of the Tasman Series in 1964 and 1967. Both races were won by World Formula One Champion drivers, Australia's own Jack Brabham in 1964 and Scotland's Jim Clark in 1967.

Year	Winner	Car	Team
1964	(Australia) Jack Brabham	Brabham BT7A Coventry Climax	Ecurie Vitesse
1967	(United Kingdom) Jim Clark	Lotus 33 Coventry Climax	Team Lotus

=== Australian Drivers' Championship ===
Lakeside hosted 17 rounds of the Australian Drivers' Championship for the CAMS Gold Star between 1963 and 1994.

Year	Winner	Car	Team
Formula Libre
1963	(Australia) Bib Stillwell	Repco Brabham Climax	B.S. Stilwell
Australian National Formula & Australian 1½ Litre Formula
1964	(Australia) Bib Stillwell	Repco Brabham BT4 Climax	B.S. Stilwell
1965	(Australia) Spencer Martin	Repco Brabham BT11A Climax	Scuderia Veloce
1966	(Australia) Spencer Martin	Repco Brabham BT11A Climax	Bob Jane Racing
1967	(Australia) Kevin Bartlett	Repco Brabham BT11A Climax	Alec Mildren Racing
1968	(Australia) Kevin Bartlett	Brabham BT23D Alfa Romeo	Alec Mildren Racing
Australian Formula 1 & Australian Formula 2
1970	(Australia) Max Stewart	Mildren Waggott	Alec Mildren Racing Pty Ltd
1971	(Australia) Kevin Bartlett	McLaren M10B Chevrolet	Kevin Bartlett Shell Racing
Australian Formula 1
1980	(Australia) Jon Davison	Lola T332 Chevrolet	Lee Seeton
1982	(Australia) Charlie O'Brien	Ralt RT4 Ford	Charlie O'Brien
1983	(Australia) Andrew Miedecke	Ralt RT4 Ford	Miedecke Motorsport
Formula Mondial
1984	(Australia) John Bowe	Ralt RT4 Ford	Chris Leach Racing
1985	(Australia) John Bowe	Ralt RT4 Ford	Chris Leach Enterprises
Australian Formula 2
1988	(Australia) Derek Pingel	Ralt RT30 Volkswagen	Ralt Australia Pty Ltd
Formula Brabham
1993*	(Australia) Mark Larkham	Reynard 91D Holden	Mitre 10 Racing
1993*	(Australia) Mark Skaife	Lola T91/50 Holden	Winfield Racing
1994	(Australia) Paul Stokell	Reynard 91D Holden	Birrana Racing

* Lakeside hosted two rounds of the 1993 Australian Drivers' Championship (both held on the same day). Mark Larkham won Round 3 and Mark Skaife won Round 4.

=== Australian Touring Car Championship ===
Between 1964 and 1998, Lakeside hosted the Australian Touring Car Championship on 29 occasions. The first two in 1964 and 1967 were when the championship was only a single race before changing to a series in 1969. Lakeside also hosted two rounds of the championship in 1991.

Year	Winner	Car	Team
Appendix J Touring Cars
1964	(Australia) Ian Geoghegan	Ford Cortina Mk.I GT	Total Team
Improved Production
1967	(Australia) Ian Geoghegan	Ford Mustang GTA	Mustang Team
1970	(Australia) Norm Beechey	Holden HT Monaro GTS350	Shell Racing
1971	(Canada) Allan Moffat	Ford Boss 302 Mustang	Coca-Cola Team AMR
Group C
1975	(Australia) Colin Bond	Holden LH Torana SL/R 5000 L34	Holden Dealer Team
1976	(Australia) Colin Bond	Holden LH Torana SL/R 5000 L34	Holden Dealer Team
1977	(Australia) Peter Brock	Holden LH Torana SL/R 5000 L34	Bill Patterson Racing
1978	(Canada) Allan Moffat	Ford XC Falcon GS500	Moffat Ford Dealers
1979	(Australia) Bob Morris	Holden LX Torana SS A9X Hatchback	Ron Hodgson Channel 7 Racing
1980	(Australia) Peter Brock	Holden VB Commodore	Marlboro Holden Dealer Team
1981	(Australia) Dick Johnson	Ford XD Falcon	Palmer Tube Mills
1982	(Canada) Allan Moffat	Mazda RX-7	Peter Stuyvesant International Racing
1983	(Australia) Peter Brock	Holden VH Commodore SS	Marlboro Holden Dealer Team
1984	(Australia) George Fury	Nissan Bluebird Turbo	Nissan Motorsport Australia
Group A
1985	(New Zealand) Jim Richards	BMW 635 CSi	JPS Team BMW
1986	(Australia) George Fury	Nissan Skyline DR30 RS	Peter Jackson Nissan Racing
1987	(New Zealand) Jim Richards	BMW M3	JPS Team BMW
1988	(Australia) Tony Longhurst	Ford Sierra RS500	Freeport Motorsport
1989	(Australia) Dick Johnson	Ford Sierra RS500	Shell Ultra-Hi Racing
1990	(Australia) Colin Bond	Ford Sierra RS500	Caltex CXT Racing
1991*	(New Zealand) Jim Richards	Nissan Skyline R32 GT-R	Nissan Motorsport Australia
1991*	(Australia) Tony Longhurst	BMW M3 Evolution	Benson & Hedges Racing
1992	(Australia) Tony Longhurst	BMW M3 Evolution	Benson & Hedges Racing
Group 3A Touring Cars
1993	(Australia) Alan Jones	Ford EB Falcon	Peter Jackson Racing
1994	(Australia) Larry Perkins	Holden VP Commodore	Castrol Perkins Racing
1995	(Australia) Glenn Seton	Ford EF Falcon	Peter Jackson Racing
1996	(Australia) Craig Lowndes	Holden VR Commodore	Holden Racing Team
1997	(Australia) John Bowe	Ford EL Falcon	Shell Helix racing
1998	(Australia) Russell Ingall	Holden VS Commodore	Castrol Perkins Racing

* Lakeside hosted two rounds of the 1991 Australian Touring Car Championship. Jim Richards won Round 4 while Tony Longhurst won Round 8.

=== Australian Super Touring Championship ===
Lakeside hosted the Australian Super Touring Championship (known as the Australian 2.0 Litre Touring Car Championship in 1993 and Australian Manufacturers' Championship in 1994) 8 times between 1993 and 2000–01.

Year	Winner	Car	Team
1993	(Australia) Colin Bond	Toyota Corolla Seca AE93	Caltex Team Toyota
1994	(Australia) Tony Longhurst	BMW 318i	Benson & Hedges Racing
1995	(Australia) Paul Morris	BMW 318i	Diet Coke BMW Racing
1996	(Australia) Paul Morris	BMW 318i	Diet Coke BMW Racing
1997	(Australia) Paul Morris	BMW 320i	Diet Coke BMW Motorsport
1998	(Australia) Brad Jones	Audi A4 Quattro	Audi Sport Australia
1999	(Australia) Paul Morris	BMW 320i	Paul Morris Motorsport
2000–01	(Australia) Paul Morris	BMW 320i	Paul Morris Motorsport

=== Australian GT Championship ===
Another national championship that Lakeside hosted was the Australian GT Championship. Lakeside held its first race of the championship in 1962, then had to wait another 20 years before the championship returned in 1982 for a 5-year run that ended with CAMS discontinuing the championship after 1985.

Year	Winner	Car	Team
1962	(Australia) John French	Centaur Waggott	GP Cars Racing Team
1982	(Australia) Alan Jones	Porsche 935/80	Porsche Cars Australia
1983	(New Zealand) Jim Richards	BMW 318i Turbo	JPS Team BMW
1984	(Australia) Allan Grice	Chevrolet Monza	Re-Car Racing
1985	(Australia) Bryan Thomson	Chevrolet Monza	Thomson-Fowler Motorsport

=== Australian Sports Car Championship ===
The Australian Sports Car Championship raced at Lakeside on 5 occasions between 1977 and 1985.

Year	Winner	Car	Team
1977	(Australia) Alan Hamilton	Porsche 934 Turbo	Porsche Distributors
1978	(Australia) Ross Mathiesen	Porsche Carrera	
1982	(Australia) Ken Peters	Auscam	
1983	(Australia) Chris Clearihan	Kaditcha Chevrolet	Canberra Sports Car Club
1984	(Australia) Bap Romano	Romano WE84 Cosworth	Bap Romano Racing
1985	(Australia) Chris Clearihan	Kaditcha Chevrolet	Chris Clearihan

=== Australian Sports Sedan Championship ===
The Australian Sports Sedan Championship raced at Lakeside on 9 occasions between 1978 and 1985.

Year	Winner	Car	Team
1978	(Australia) Allan Grice	Chevrolet Corvair	Craven Mild Racing
1979	(New Zealand) Jim Richards	Ford XC Falcon	Jim Richards Motor Racing
1980	(Australia) Allan Grice	BMW 318i Turbo	Craven Mild Racing
1981	(Australia) John Briggs	Chevrolet Monza	John Roberts
1991*	(Australia) Mick Monterosso	Ford Escort Mark II Chevrolet	Mick Monterosso
1991*	(Australia) Des Wall	Toyota Supra Chevrolet	Des Wall
1992*	(Australia) Kerry Baily	Toyota Celica Supra Chevrolet	Kerry Baily
1992*	(Australia) Kerry Baily	Toyota Celica Supra Chevrolet	Kerry Baily
1993*	(Australia) John Briggs	Honda Prelude Chevrolet	John Briggs
1993*	(Australia) John Briggs	Honda Prelude Chevrolet	John Briggs
1996	(Australia) John Briggs	Honda Prelude Chevrolet	John Briggs
1999	(Australia) Tony Ricciardello	Alfa Romeo Alfetta GTV Chevrolet	Basil Ricciardello

* Lakeside hosted two rounds of the 1991, 1992 and 1993 championships with both rounds held on the same day.

=== Australian Formula 2 Championship ===
Australian Formula 2 Championship raced at Lakeside on 7 occasions between 1970 and 1988. The 1971 and 1988 races were part of the Australian Drivers' Championship for the CAMS Gold Star.

Year	Winner	Car	Team
1970	(Australia) Max Stewart	Mildren Waggott TC4V	Alec Mildren Racing
1971	(Australia) Tony Stewart	Elfin 600B England Ford	Paul England Pty Ltd
1974	(Australia) Ray Winter	Mildren Mono Ford	Ray Winter
1985	(Australia) Peter Macrow	Cheetah Mk 8 Volkswagen	Peter Macrow
1986	(Australia) Jon Crooke	Cheetah Mk 8 Volkswagen	Jonathon Crooke
1987	(Australia) Mark McLaughlin	Elfin 852 Volkswagen	Elfin Sports Cars Pty Ltd
1988	(Australia) Derek Pingel	Ralt RT30 Volkswagen	Ralt Australia Pty Ltd

== Lap records ==
As of December 2020, the fastest official race lap records at the Lakeside International Raceway are listed as:

Category	Time	Driver	Vehicle	Date
Full Circuit (1961–present): 2.410 km (1.498 mi)
Formula Holden	0:46.66	Paul Stokell	Reynard 91D	17 July 1994
Formula Mondial	0:49.0	Alfredo Costanzo	Tiga FA81	23 July 1983
Australian Formula 2	0:50.6	Jonathan Crooke	Cheetah Mk 8	15 June 1986
Group 3A	0:51.445	Glenn Seton	Ford EL Falcon	15 June 1997
Super Touring	0:52.233	Jim Richards	Volvo S40	28 June 1998
Group A	0:53.160	Mark Skaife	Nissan Skyline GT-R R32	14 July 1991
Tasman Formula	0:53.8	Chris Amon	Dino 246 Tasmania	2 February 1969
Formula One	0:54.66	Jim Clark	Lotus 33	12 February 1967
Formula Ford	0:58.7203	James Corbett	Spectrum 014b	5 December 2020
