= 1996 Australian Sports Sedan Championship =

Motor racing competition

The 1996 Australian Sports Sedan Championship was a CAMS sanctioned Australian motor racing championship open to Group 2D Sports Sedans. The title, which was the twelfth Australian Sports Sedan Championship, was won by John Briggs driving a Honda Prelude Chevrolet.

== Schedule ==
The championship was contested over a four round series.

Round	Circuit	State	Date	Format	Winning driver	Car
1	Lakeside	Queensland	5 May	Two races	John Briggs	Honda Prelude Chevrolet
2	Oran Park	New South Wales	16 June	Two races	John Briggs	Honda Prelude Chevrolet
3	Sandown	Victoria	8 September	Two races	John Briggs	Honda Prelude Chevrolet
4	Phillip Island	Victoria	22 September	Two races	John Briggs	Honda Prelude Chevrolet

== Championship standings ==
Position	Driver	No.	Car	Entrant	Lak.	Ora.	San.	Phi.	Total
1	John Briggs	9	Honda Prelude Chevrolet	John Briggs	42	42	42	42	168
2	Kerry Baily	28	Toyota Supra Chevrolet	Kerry Baily	38	38	36	38	150
3	James Phillip	55	Honda Prelude Chevrolet	James Phillip	26	28	28	30	112
4	Mick Monterosso	2	Ford Escort RS2000	Mick Monterosso	–	34	36	34	104
5	Bob Jolly	3	Holden VS Commodore	Bob Jolly	–	28	16	32	76
6	Danny Osborne	15	Mazda RX-7		26	10	30	–	66
7	Mike Imrie	4	Saab	Imrie Motor Sport	23	11	–	28	62
8	Mark Trenoweth	8	Jaguar		33	24	–	–	57
9	Ivan Mikac	42	Mazda RX-7	Ivan Mikac	–	–	25	26	51
10	Des Wall	20	Toyota Supra		15	32	–	–	47
11	Kevin Clark	116	Ford Mustang GT	Kevin Clark	–	–	23	23	46
12	Peter O'Brien	17	Holden VL Commodore	O'Brien Aluminium	–	11	29	–	40
13	Chris Fing	21	Chevrolet Monza		29	–	–	–	29
14	Brian Smith	5	Alfa Romeo GTV Chevrolet		–	28	–	–	28
15	Gary Rowe	47	Nissan Stanza	Gary Rowe	–	–	21	–	21
=	Domenic Beninca	52			–	–	–	21	21
17	Phil Crompton	49	Ford EA Falcon	Phil Crompton	17	–	–	–	17
18	Allan McCarthy	48	Alfa Romeo Alfetta		14	–	–	–	14
19	Chris Donnelly	43			12	–	–	–	12
=	Paul Barrett	46			–	–	–	12	12
21	Brett Francis	77			11	–	–	–	11
22	Shane Eklund	32			10	–	–	–	10
=	Craig Wildridge	54			–	10	–	–	10
=	Ron O'Brien	18			–	–	–	10	10
