= 1997 Australian Sports Sedan Championship =

Motor racing title

The 1997 Australian Sports Sedan Championship was a CAMS sanctioned motor racing title for drivers of Group 2D Sports Sedans. The championship, which was the thirteenth Australian Sports Sedan Championship, was won by Kerry Baily driving a Toyota Celica Supra.

== Calendar ==
The championship was contested over a three-round series with two races per round.

| Round | Circuit | State | Date |
| 1 | Winton Raceway | Victoria | 18 May |
| 2 | Calder Park | Victoria | 22 June |
| 3 | Oran Park | New South Wales | 3 August |

== Points system ==
Championship points were awarded on a 21-19-17-16-15-14-13-12-11-10 basis to the top ten finishers in each race.

== Results ==
| Position | Driver | No. | Car | Rd1 R1 | Rd1 R2 | Rd2 R1 | Rd2 R2 | Rd3 R1 | Rd3 R2 | Total |
|---|---|---|---|---|---|---|---|---|---|---|
| 1 | Kerry Baily | 28 | Toyota Celica Supra Chevrolet | 19 | 19 | 17 | 21 | 19 | 19 | 114 |
| 2 | Mick Monterosso | 2 | Ford Escort RS2000 Chevrolet | - | 21 | 15 | 19 | 21 | 21 | 97 |
| 3 | Wayne Park | 25 | Mazda RX-7 | 21 | 13 | 21 | 16 | 16 | - | 87 |
| 4 | Bob Jolly | 3 | Holden VS Commodore Chevrolet | - | 17 | 19 | 15 | 13 | 17 | 81 |
| 5 | Stephen Voight | 38 & 88 | Honda Prelude Chevrolet | - | 14 | 16 | 17 | 14 | 16 | 77 |
| 6 | Barry Morcom | 7 | Ford Falcon XR8 | 16 | 15 | - | - | 15 | 15 | 61 |
| 7 | Ron Newbound | 81 | Mazda RX-7 | 15 | 12 | 14 | 13 | - | - | 54 |
| 8 | Mike Imrie | 4 | Saab 900 Chevrolet | 12 | - | 11 | 14 | - | 13 | 50 |
| 9 | Clive Smith | 55 | Nissan Skyline DR30 | 13 | 11 | 12 | 12 | - | - | 48 |
| 10 | Ivan Mikac | 42 | Mazda RX-7 | 14 | 10 | - | - | - | 11 | 35 |
| 11 | Tony Hubbard | 16 | Holden VP Commodore Chevrolet | 17 | 16 | - | - | - | - | 33 |
| 12 | Anthony Wilson | 27 | Ford Escort | - | - | 13 | 11 | - | - | 24 |
| 13 | Des Wall | 20 | Toyota Supra Chevrolet | - | - | - | - | 17 | - | 17 |
| 14 | Peter O'Brien | 17 | Holden VL Commodore Chevrolet | - | - | - | - | - | 14 | 14 |
| 15 | Glen Taylor | 19 | Holden VN Commodore | - | - | - | - | 12 | - | 12 |
| 15 | Craig Wildridge | 54 | Ford Capri | - | - | - | - | - | 12 | 12 |
| 17 | Terry Sheil | 11 | Mazda RX-7 | - | - | - | - | 11 | - | 11 |
| 17 | Paul Barrett | 48 | Mazda RX-7 | 11 | - | - | - | - | - | 11 |
| 19 | Brian Hicks | 40 | Alfa Romeo | 10 | - | - | - | - | - | 10 |
| 19 | Russell Stenhouse | 97 | Holden LX Torana SS5000 A9X | - | - | - | - | - | 10 | 10 |
| 19 | Barry Bray | 36 | Nissan Gazelle | - | - | - | 10 | - | - | 10 |
| 19 | Ron O'Brien | 18 | Ford Sierra Chevrolet | - | - | 10 | - | - | - | 10 |
