= 1981 Australian Sports Sedan Championship =

Motor racing competition

The 1981 Australian Sports Sedan Championship was an Australian motor racing competition for Group B Sports Sedans. It was sanctioned by the Confederation of Australian Motor Sport and was the sixth Australian Sports Sedan Championship.

Reigning champion Tony Edmonson, won his second consequtive title in the Don Elliot-owned Alfa Romeo Alfetta GTV, this time fitted with an ex-Formula 5000 5.0 L Chevrolet V8 engine instead of the Repco Holden V8 used in 1980. His closest competition came from the 6.0 litre Chevrolet Monza of Adelaide's John Briggs, who finished second, with Sydney's Phil Ward third in his Penthouse sponsored Holden Monaro HQ. Both the Alfa Romeo and the Chevrolet were built by Adelaide-based K&A Engineering.

The championship was the last for Australian driver / businessman Bob Jane, who drove his Pat Purcell-built Chevrolet Monza to equal ninth in the series. Jane, who had won the Bathurst 500 on four occasions in the 1960s and had also won four Australian Touring Car Championships, retired from driving at the end of 1981 due to an ongoing back injury.

The Sports Sedan Championship was discontinued with the introduction of the Australian GT Championship in 1982. Some Sports Sedans were converted to GT specifications and others competed in the new championship with the GT cars. The GT Championship itself lasted only until 1985 before also being disbanded. Although there would be minor Sports Sedan series contested in various Australian states, the Australian Sports Sedan Championship itself would not return to the Australian calendar until 1991.

== Calendar ==
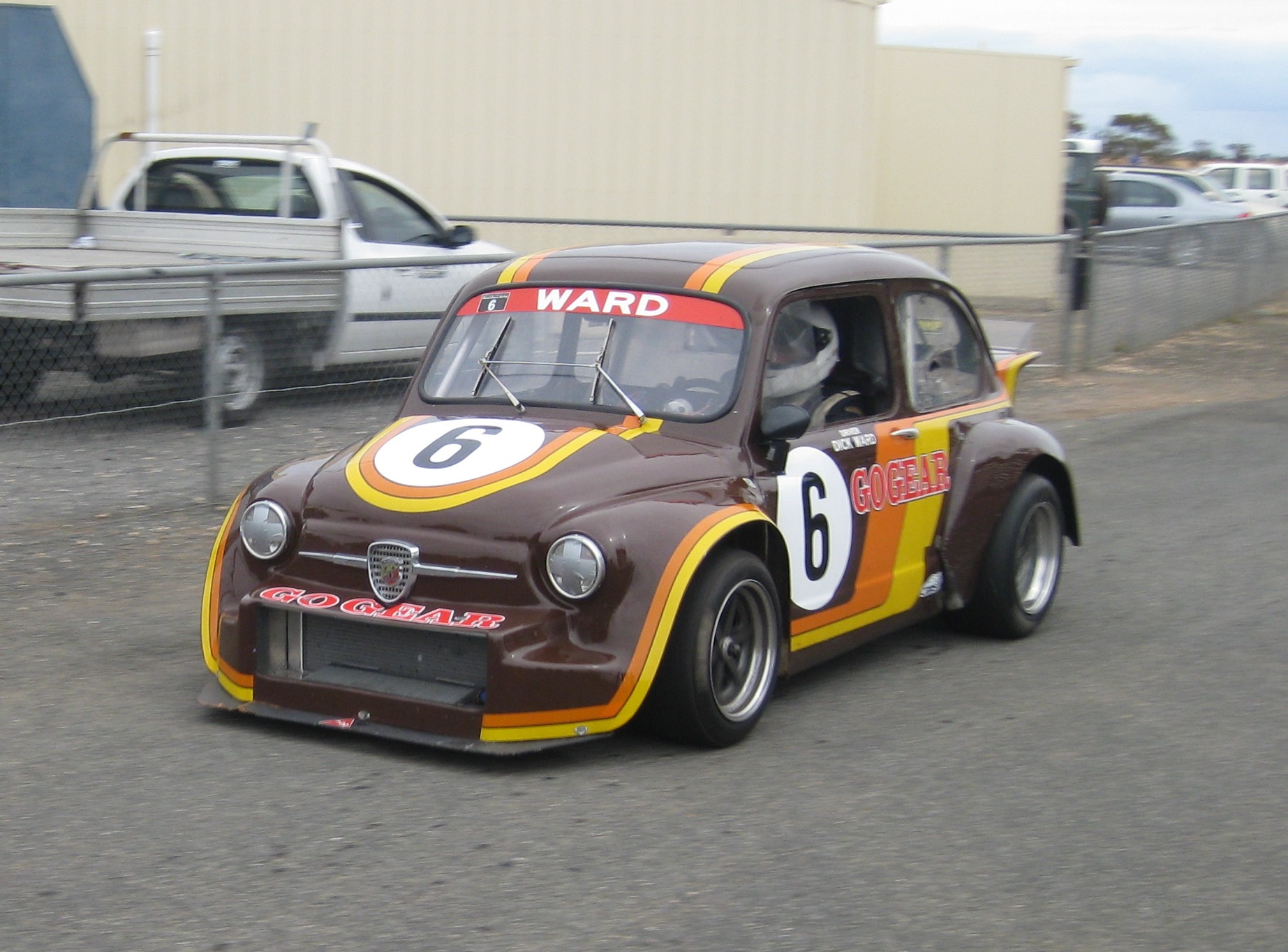
Dick Ward placed 14th in the championship driving a Fiat Abarth. Car and driver are depicted in 2013

The championship was contested over eleven rounds.

| Round | Name | Circuit | State | Date | Format | Winning driver | Car |
| 1 | | Lakeside | Queensland | 29 March | Two heats | John Briggs | Chevrolet Monza |
| 2 | | Winton | Victoria | 3 May | Two heats | Tony Edmondson | Alfa Romeo Alfetta GTV; Chevrolet-powered |
| 3 | | Amaroo Park | New South Wales | 24 May | Two heats | Tony Edmondson | Alfa Romeo Alfetta GTV; Chevrolet-powered |
| 4 | | Oran Park | New South Wales | 21 June | Two heats | Tony Edmondson | Alfa Romeo Alfetta GTV; Chevrolet-powered |
| 5 | | Sandown | Victoria | 5 July | One race | Garry Rogers | Holden Torana LX |
| 6 | Patra Challenge | Calder | Victoria | 2 August | Two heats | Tony Edmondson | Alfa Romeo Alfetta GTV; Chevrolet-powered |
| 7 | | Wanneroo Park | Western Australia | 16 August | Two heats | Tony Edmondson | Alfa Romeo Alfetta GTV; Chevrolet-powered |
| 8 | | Surfers Paradise | Queensland | 30-Aug | Two heats | Allan Grice | BMW 320i |
| 9 | | Symmons Plains | Tasmania | 20-Sep | One race | John Briggs | Chevrolet Monza |
| 10 | | Baskerville | Tasmania | 11 October | Two heats | Tony Edmondson | Alfa Romeo Alfetta GTV; Chevrolet-powered |
| 11 | The Advertiser Sports Sedan Challenge | Adelaide International Raceway | South Australia | 25 October | Two heats | Tony Edmondson | Alfa Romeo Alfetta GTV; Chevrolet-powered |

== Points ==
Championship points were awarded on a 9–6–4–3–2–1 basis to the top six placegetters in each round. Only the best nine round performances were counted towards each driver's championship total. For rounds run over two heats, round points were awarded on a 20–16–13–11–10–9–8–7–6–5–4–3–2–1 basis to the top 14 placegetters in each heat. The six drivers attaining the highest aggregate from the two heats were then awarded the championship points for that round. If more than one driver attained the same total, the relevant round placing was awarded to the driver who achieved the higher placing in the second heat.

== Results ==
| Position | Driver | No. | Car | Entrant | Rd 1 | Rd 2 | Rd 3 | Rd 4 | Rd 5 | Rd 6 | Rd 7 | Rd 8 | Rd 9 | Rd 10 | Rd 11 | Total |
|---|---|---|---|---|---|---|---|---|---|---|---|---|---|---|---|---|
| 1 | Tony Edmondson | 1 | Alfa Romeo Alfetta GTV; Chevrolet-powered | Donald Elliott | 4 | 9 | 9 | 9 | – | 9 | 9 | – | – | 9 | 9 | 67 |
| 2 | John Briggs | 9 | Chevrolet Monza | John Roberts | 9 | – | 1 | – | – | 6 | – | 6 | 9 | 6 | 6 | 43 |
| 3 | Phil Ward | 2 | Holden Monaro HQ | Australian Penthouse Racing | 6 | 6 | 6 | 4 | – | 4 | – | 1 | 4 | 4 | – | 35 |
| 4 | Garry Rogers | 34 | Holden Torana LX | Garry Rogers | – | – | – | 6 | 9 | 2 | – | – | 6 | 3 | – | 26 |
| 5 | Allan Grice | 11 | BMW 318i | JPS Team BMW | – | – | 4 | – | 3 | – | 6 | 9 | – | – | – | 22 |
| 6 | Tony Parkinson | 28 & 12 | Holden Commodore VB | QH – Adelaide Brake Service | 3 | – | – | 3 | 4 | – | – | – | 3 | 2 | 3 | 18 |
| 7 | Clem Smith | 16 | Chrysler Valiant Charger VH | Clem Smith | – | – | – | – | – | – | – | 4 | – | – | 4 | 8 |
| 8 | Peter Finch | 16 | Holden Monaro HQ | Peter Finch | – | – | – | – | 6 | 1 | – | – | – | – | – | 7 |
| 9 | Bob Jane | 10 & 7 | Chevrolet Monza | Bob Jane T-Marts | – | – | – | – | – | 3 | – | – | – | – | 2 | 5 |
| 9 | John English | 14 | Ford Escort Mk 1 | Bryan Byrt Ford | 2 | – | – | – | – | – | – | 3 | – | – | – | 5 |
| 9 | John Tesoriero | 32 | Volvo 242 | John Tesoriero | – | – | 3 | – | – | – | – | 2 | – | – | – | 5 |
| 12 | Geoff Boyd | 29 | Holden Torana | Carling Constructions | – | 4 | – | – | – | – | – | – | – | – | – | 4 |
| 12 | Gordon Mitchell | 57 | Alfa Romeo GTV | Cechelle Motors | – | – | – | – | – | – | 4 | – | – | – | – | 4 |
| 14 | Ken James | 49 | Mazda RX-3 | | – | 3 | – | – | – | – | – | – | – | – | – | 3 |
| 14 | Dick Ward | 27 | Fiat Abarth | Go Gear-rotomotion | – | – | – | – | – | – | 3 | – | – | – | – | 3 |
| 16 | Jeff Groves | 97 | Ford Escort | Jeff Groves | – | 2 | – | – | – | – | – | – | – | – | – | 2 |
| 16 | Bob Stevens | 17 | Holden Monaro HQ | Bob Stevens | – | – | 2 | – | – | – | – | – | – | – | – | 2 |
| 16 | Paul Jones | 64 | Chevrolet Monza | Paul Jones | – | – | – | 2 | – | – | – | – | – | – | – | 2 |
| 16 | Rusty French | 23 | Ford Falcon XD | Rusty French Racing | – | – | – | – | 2 | – | – | – | – | – | – | 2 |
| 16 | Craig Marsland | 56 | Chrysler Valiant Charger | Pizza Hut | – | – | – | – | – | – | 2 | – | – | – | – | 2 |
| 16 | Rob Davies | 44 | Ford Escort Mk 1 | | – | – | – | – | – | – | – | – | 2 | – | – | 2 |
| 22 | Kent Youlden | 55 | Ford Cortina TE | Dowsett Engineering | – | 1 | – | – | 1 | – | – | – | – | – | – | 2 |
| 23 | John White | 65 | Chevrolet Monza | John White | 1 | – | – | – | – | – | – | – | – | – | – | 1 |
| 23 | Larry Perkins | 69 | Holden Commodore VC | Launceston Hotel | – | – | – | 1 | – | – | – | – | – | – | – | 1 |
| 23 | Gordon Stephenson | 75 | Alfa Romeo Alfetta GT | Gordon Stephenson | – | – | – | – | – | – | 1 | – | – | – | – | 1 |
| 23 | Kerry Baily | 58 | Holden Torana GTR XU-1 | | – | – | – | – | – | – | – | – | 1 | – | – | 1 |
| 23 | Richard Purtell | 62 | Holden Torana GTR XU-1 | | – | – | – | – | – | – | – | – | – | 1 | – | 1 |
| 23 | Luigi DeLuca | 22 | Ford Anglia | DWU Australia Pty Ltd | – | – | – | – | – | – | – | – | – | – | 1 | 1 |

- Note: The top six results in the above table are based on those published in Australian Motor Racing Year, 1981, Page 164 however additional positions below the top six have been calculated from results for Rounds 1 through 10 in the same publication and results for the final round in Racing Car News, November 1981, page 35.
