= 2000 Australian Sports Sedan Championship =

Australian motor racing sport in 2000

The 2000 Australian Sports Sedan Championship was a CAMS sanctioned Australian motor racing title for drivers of Sports Sedans. The title, which was the sixteenth Australian Sports Sedan Championship, was won by Kerry Baily, driving a Nissan 300ZX.

== Calendar ==
The championship was contested over a five-round series.

Round	Circuit	State	Date	Format	Round winner	Car
1	Oran Park	New South Wales	16 April	Three races	Kerry Baily	Nissan 300ZX Chevrolet
2	Winton Motor Raceway	Victoria	4 June	Three races		
3	Mallala Motor Sport Park	South Australia	9 July	Three races	Kerry Baily	Nissan 300ZX Chevrolet
4	Oran Park	New South Wales	10 September	Three races	Tony Ricciardello	Alfa Romeo GTV Chevrolet
5	Sandown International Motor Raceway	Victoria	8 October	Two races		

== Championship results ==
Position	Driver	No.	Car	Entrant	Points
1	Kerry Baily	28	Nissan 300ZX Chevrolet	Kerry Baily	256
2	Tony Ricciardello	1	Alfa Romeo Alfetta GTV Chevrolet	Basil Ricciardello	248
3	Ivan Mikac	42	Mazda RX-7	Ivan Mikac	202
4	Des Wall	20	Toyota Supra Chevrolet	Des Wall	196
5	Darren Hossack	4	Saab 900 Aero Chevrolet	John Gourlay	180
6	Tony Wilson	27	Holden VS Commodore Chevrolet	Anthony Wilson	136
7	Grant Munday	14	Holden VS Commodore Chevrolet	Mike Imrie	116
8	Phil Crompton	49	Ford EB Falcon	Phil Crompton	115
9	Bob Jolly	3	Holden VS Commodore Chevrolet	Bob Jolly	111
10	Dean Randle	33	Saab 900 Aero Chevrolet	Dean Randle	93
11	Barry Jameson	45	Ford EF Falcon Chevrolet	Barry Jameson	81
12	Mick Monterosso	2	Ford Escort Mk.II Chevrolet	Mick Monterosso	71
13	Richard Catchlove	13	Mazda RX-7	Richard Catchlove	68
14	Bruce de Boo	44	Mazda RX-7	Bruce de Boo	64
15	Mark Duggan	11	Holden Calibra Chevrolet	Mark Duggan	57
16	Stephen Voight	38; 45	Honda Prelude Chevrolet; Ford EF Falcon Chevrolet	Stephen Voight; Barry Jameson	55
17	Daniel Jameson	45	Ford EF Falcon Chevrolet	Barry Jameson	50
18	Peter Elvey	18	Ford Escort		45
19	Brian Walden	12	Holden VS Commodore Chevrolet	Garth Walden	44
20	Ron O'Brien	18	Holden VL Commodore SS Group A SV Chevrolet	O'Brien Aluminium	41
21	Kevin Clark	16	Ford Mustang	Kevin Clark	36
21	Ron Newbound	81	Mazda RX-7	Ron Newbound	36
23	Lee Nicholle	110	Holden LJ Torana GTR XU-1	Lee Nicholle	35
24	Ken House	30	Ford Escort	Ken House	32
25	Trent Young	41	Toyota Levin	Trent Young	27
26	Jeff Barnes	6	Pontiac Firebird Trans Am Chevrolet	Barnes High Performance	26
27	Norm Stokes	24	Mazda RX-7		24
28	Darryl Knuckey	70	Ford Capri	Darryl Knuckey	21
29	Mark Stinson	7; 13	Ford Falcon; Holden Calibra Chevrolet	Barry Morcom; Mark Stinson	16
30	Paul Dibb	8	Nissan Pulsar EXA		14
31	Tony Hubbard	25	Holden Calibra	Tony Hubbard	12
32	Robert Smith	72	Holden VS Commodore	Smiths Trucks Pty Ltd	9
33	John Cook	25	Mazda RX-7	John Cook	8
33	Stephen Vines	31	Ford TC Cortina	Joe Pirotta	8
35	Bill Martin	70	Mazda RX-7		7
35	Milton Serefis	5	Holden VS Commodore	Milton Serefis	7
37	Mark Smith	29	Holden Gemini	Mark Smith	6
37	Dean Camm	33	Honda Prelude	Dean Camm	6
37	Mike Roddy	34	Jaguar XJ-S	Mike Roddy	6
