= 2022 National Sports Sedan Series =

Motor racing competition

The 2022 National Sports Sedan Series was an Australian motor racing competition for Group 3D Sports Sedans, Trans Am type automobiles and other invited automobiles. It was sanctioned by Motorsport Australia as an Authorised Series with Sports Sedans Pty Ltd appointed as the Category Manager. It was the 37th National Sports Sedan Series.

The series was won by Jordan Casuso driving an Audi A4.

== Race calendar ==
The series was contested over five rounds, each comprising three races.

Round	Circuit	Date
1	Phillip Island	18–20 March
2	Winton Raceway	20–22 May
3	The Bend Motorsport Park	29–31 July
4	Sydney Motorsport Park	2–4 September
5	Sandown	4–6 November

== Points system ==
Points were awarded to drivers for each race in each round on their outright finishing position except for a driver of any invited automobile.

Position	Race 1	Race 2	Race 3
1st	30	45	60
2nd	28	42	56
3rd	26	39	52
4th	24	36	48
5th	22	33	44
6th	20	30	40
7th	18	27	36
8th	16	24	32
9th	14	21	28
10th	12	18	24
11th	10	15	20
12th	8	12	16
13th	6	9	12
14th	4	6	8
15th and below	2	3	4

== Series standings ==
Pos.	Driver	No.	Car	Competitor/Team	Phi.	Win.	Syd.	Phi.	San.	Total
1	Jordan Casuso	4	Audi A4	John Gourlay	133	133	135	131	135	667
2	Steven Tamasi	9	Holden Calibra	Precision International	128	128	126	123	0	505
3	Shane Woodman	16	BMW M3 GTR	Landells Signs	115	77	112	71	99	474
4	Michael Robinson	32	Holden Monaro	Poletek/Bell Real Estate	66	98	92	51	96	403
5	Shane Bradford	68	Chevrolet Camaro	Aston Air Conditioning	89	54	51	0	112	306
6	Ashley Jarvis	44	Holden Monaro	M R Automotive	0	0	74	98	124	296
7	Daniel Crompton	12	Ford Mustang	Performance Tower Hire	96	90	2	64	0	252
8	Geoffrey Taunton	95	MARC II V8	Tauntons Excavations/EEA Group	0	0	109	109	0	218
9	Scott Cameron	111	Holden Commodore VS	Link Propert Service/DCR	43	3	73	62	0	181
10	Anthony Cox	14	Saab 9-3	RSR Mechanical	36	49	57	37	0	179
11	Ryan Humfrey	30	Ford Falcon XE	Carlden Wines	0	93	57	0	0	150
12	Andre Heimgartner	58	Aston Martin	Duggan Family Hotels	26	0	0	120	0	146
13	Liam Hooper	441	Nissan Skyline GTST	Racetech Performance	0	0	0	42	103	145
14	Andrew Brown	60	Chevrolet Camaro	Andrew Brown	80	44	0	0	0	124
15	Mason Kelly	90	MARC Mazda 3	Mason Kelly	0	64	28	31	0	123
16	Alex Williams	37	Mazda RX-7	Rebound Injury Movement	0	117	0	0	0	117
17	Allen Nash	11	Holden Commodore VE	Nash Painting	62	0	39	0	0	101
18	Travis Condon	177	Toyota Corolla	Victorian Door Automation	0	0	9	0	87	96
19	Lloyd Godfrey	29	Honda Integra	Futura Trailers	31	15	0	46	0	92
20	Tony Groves	80	Mazda 3	Mornington Mazda/ Valvoline	0	0	70	0	0	70
21	Rick Newman	65	Ford Falcon	Nuline Homes	61	0	0	0	0	61
22	Keven Stoopman	2	Mitsubishi Lancer EVO	Tyrepower	48	12	0	0	0	60
23	Dean Lillie	3	Ford Falcon BA	HF Motorsport	0	52	0	0	0	52
24	R Maclurkin Jnr.	54	Nissan 180SX	Machinecult Motorsports	0	9	0	0	40	49
25	Damian Johnson	19	Holden Torana	"For Andrea"	0	0	0	0	39	39
26	Mark Tracey	15	BMW E36	Tracey Motorsport	0	33	0	0	0	33
27	Nick Smith	69	Mazda RX-7	Ramsay Surveyors	0	0	0	20	0	20
28	Ranald Maclurkin Snr.	56	Aston Martin Vantage	Machinecult Motorsports	0	3	0	0	14	17
29	Scott Stephenson	41	Mazda RX-8	Scotty's Motorsport Services	0	0	16	0	0	16
30	Graeme Gilliland	21	Mazda RX-7	P&L Mechanical / Elite Sheds	0	14	0	0	0	14
=	Josh Pickert	45	Holden Monaro	Natrad/Aquest Electrical/ D&S	0	0	14	0	0	14
32	Francois Habib	23	Holden Commodore VZ	HF Motorsport	0	10	0	0	0	10
33	Damien Gambold	7	Ford Falcon	Gambold Mechanical	0	9	0	0	0	9
=	Ryan Smith	34	Nissan Skyline	Wing It Garage/Phoenix Lining	0	0	9	0	0	9
35	Matthew Wildy	7	Ford Mustang	Performance Tower Hire	0	0	5	0	0	5
