= 1993 Australian Sports Sedan Championship =

Motor racing competition

The 1993 Australian Sports Sedan Championship was a CAMS sanctioned national motor racing title for drivers of Group 2D Sports Sedans.

== Rounds ==
The championship was contested over an eight-round series:

- Round 1, Oran Park, New South Wales, 7 March
- Round 2, Oran Park, New South Wales, 7 March
- Round 3, Sandown Park, Victoria, 18 April
- Round 4, Sandown Park, Victoria, 18 April
- Round 5, Lakeside, Queensland, 5 September
- Round 6, Lakeside, Queensland, 5 September
- Round 7, Oran Park, New South Wales, 24 October
- Round 8, Oran Park, New South Wales, 24 October

Championship points were awarded on a 20-15-12-10-8-6-4-3-2-1 basis to the first ten finishers in each round.

== Results ==
Position	Driver	No.	Car	Rd 1	Rd 2	Rd 3	Rd 4	Rd 5	Rd 6	Rd 7	Rd 8	Total
1	Kerry Baily	28	Toyota Supra Chevrolet	20	20	15	12	-	-	-	10	77
2	Barry Jameson	45	Ford Falcon EB Chevrolet	-	-	-	20	15	15	12	15	77
3	Des Wall	48	Toyota Supra Chevrolet	-	-	20	15	-	-	15	12	62
4	David Attard	49	Holden Commodore VL Chevrolet; Alfa Romeo Alfetta Chevrolet	15	12	-	-	12	12	10	-	61
4	Ian Luff	4	Holden Commodore VN Chevrolet	12	15	10	8	-	-	8	8	61
6	John Briggs	9	Honda Prelude Chevrolet	-	-	-	-	20	20	-	-	40
6	Keith Carling	14	Nissan 300ZX	-	-	-	-	-	-	20	20	40
8	Bruce Banks	13	Mazda RX-7	10	8	6	3	-	-	3	2	32
9	Paul Barrett	44	Mazda RX-7	8	10	-	-	-	-	6	6	30
10	Bob Jolly	3	Holden Commodore Chevrolet	-	-	12	10	-	-	-	-	22
11	Ivan Mikac	41	Mazda RX-7	6	4	3	4	-	4	-	-	21
12	Steven Johnson	18	Datsun 1600 Mazda	-	-	-	-	8	10	-	-	18
13	Terry Skene	20	Holden Commodore VH Chevrolet	-	-	-	-	10	6	-	-	16
14	Robin Doherty	27	Holden Commodore Chevrolet	-	-	8	6	-	-	-	-	14
14	Graham Neilsen	43	Mazda RX-7	-	-	-	-	6	8	-	-	14
14	Jamie Miller	96	Ford Escort Mazda	4	6	4	-	-	-	-	-	14
17	Fred Axisa	80	Holden Commodore VK	-	3	-	-	-	-	4	3	10
18	Peter O'Brien	17	Holden Commodore	-	-	-	-	-	-	2	4	6
19	Phil Crompton	21	Ford Capri	-	-	-	-	4	-	-	-	4
19	Graham Smith	16	Fiat 131	3	1	-	-	-	-	-	-	4
19	Brent Lyndon	81	Ford Escort	-	-	-	-	3	1	-	-	4
19	Steve Westbury	22	Ford Falcon XE	2	2	-	-	-	-	-	-	4
23	Warren Smith	77	Rover Vitesse Chevrolet	-	-	-	-	-	3	-	-	3
23	Len Cattlin	37	Mazda 929	-	-	2	1	-	-	-	-	3
23	John Donnelly	15	Ford Falcon	-	-	-	-	1	2	-	-	3
26	Ken Hastings	57	Mazda R100	-	-	-	2	-	-	-	-	2
26	Wayne Clift	38	Holden Commodore VK SSGroupA	-	-	-	-	2	-	-	-	2
28	Peter Conyers	97	Mazda RX-3	1	-	-	-	-	-	-	-	1
28	Manfred Henkel	47	Alfa Romeo	-	-	-	-	-	-	1	-	1

Note: There were only nine finishers in Rounds 3 & 8
