= 2017 National Sports Sedan Series =

Motor racing competition

The 2017 National Sports Sedan Series was an Australian motor racing competition for Group 3D Sports Sedans and Class TA Trans Am cars. It was the 34th national series for Sports Sedans.

The series was won by Birol Cetin driving a Chevrolet Camaro.

== Race calendar ==
The series was contested over five rounds, each comprising three races.

Round	Circuit	Date
1	Wakefield Park	1–2 April
2	Winton Raceway	17–18 June
3	Sydney Motorsport Park	1–2 July
4	Phillip Island	30 September - 1 October
5	Sydney Motorsport Park	28–29 October

== Points system ==
Points were awarded in each race at each round of the series as follows:

Position	Race 1	Race 2	Race 3
1st	30	45	60
2nd	28	42	56
3rd	26	39	52
4th	24	36	48
5th	22	33	44
6th	20	30	40
7th	18	27	36
8th	16	24	32
9th	14	21	28
10th	12	18	24
11th	10	15	20
12th	8	12	16
13th	6	9	12
14th	4	6	8
15th and below	2	3	4

== Series standings ==
Pos.	Driver	No.	Car	Wak.	Win.	Syd.	Phi.	Syd.	Total
1	Birol Cetin	1 & 27	Chevrolet Camaro	126	91	126	104	130	577
2	Michael Robinson	32	Holden Monaro Chevrolet	92	118	102	124	113	549
3	Steve Lacey	118	Chevrolet Camaro Z28	26	105	105	133	131	500
4	Jack Perkins	4	Audi A4 Chevrolet	135	135	135	30	0	435
5	Alex Williams	37	Mazda RX-7	64	96	0	109	67	336
6	Bruce Henley	41	Mazda RX-8 GT	65	83	71	93	0	312
7	Shane Woodman	16	BMW M3 GTR Chevrolet	82	0	94	0	110	286
8	Steven Tamasi	19	Nissan 300ZX; Holden Calibra	79	110	0	0	0	189
9	Tony Cox	95	Saab Dodge	0	0	83	0	92	175
10	Colin Smith	44	Holden Monaro	89	0	0	0	76	165
11	Kerry Baily	58	Aston Martin DBR9	115	0	0	0	0	115
12	Charlie Spiteri	376	Mitsubishi Lancer Evo VIII	35	0	62	0	10	107
13	Daniel Tamasi	9	Holden Calibra	50	0	0	52	0	102
14	Scott Reed	25	Ford Mustang	0	0	0	0	87	87
15	Paul Boschert	25	Chevrolet Corvette	0	0	81	0	0	81
16	Phil Crompton	12	Ford Mustang	22	0	50	0	0	72
17	Shane Bradford	68	Chevrolet Camaro	0	0	0	0	57	57
18	Daniel Smith	23	Mitsubishi Lancer Evo	18	0	15	0	0	33
19	Dean Camm	66	Chevrolet Corvette	0	0	0	0	12	12
