= 1999 Australian Sports Sedan Championship =

Motor racing competition

The 1999 Australian Sports Sedan Championship was a CAMS sanctioned Australian motor racing title open to Sports Sedans complying with CAMS Group 2D regulations. The championship, which was the fifteenth Australian Sports Sedan Championship, was won by Tony Ricciardello driving an Alfa Romeo Alfetta GTV – Chevrolet.

== Calendar ==
The championship was contested over a five round series.

Round	Circuit	State	Date	Format
1	Oran Park	New South Wales	2 May	Three races
2	Lakeside International Raceway	Queensland	20 June	Three races
3	Mallala Motor Sport Park	South Australia	15 August	Three races
4	Barbagallo Raceway	Western Australia	26 September	Three races
5	Oran Park	New South Wales	24 October	Three races

== Championship results ==
Position	Driver	No.	Car	Entrant	Points
1	Tony Ricciardello	1	Alfa Romeo Alfetta GTV – Chevrolet	Basil Ricciardello	243
2	Kerry Baily	38	Honda Prelude – Chevrolet	Stephen Voight / Kerry Baily	196
3	Mick Monterosso	2	Holden VP Commodore – Chevrolet; Ford Escort RS2000 – Chevrolet	Mick Monterosso	169
4	Des Wall	20	Toyota Supra – Chevrolet	Des Wall	166
5	Ivan Mikac	42	Mazda RX-7	Ivan Mikac	126
6	Grant Munday	14	Holden VN Commodore	Grant Munday	119
7	Barry Jameson	45	Ford EF Falcon XR8 – Chevrolet	Barry Jameson	111
8	Phil Crompton	49	Ford EB Falcon	Phil Crompton	97
9	Kevin Clark	16	Ford Mustang GT	Kevin Clark	92
10	David Krause	179	Holden EH	Ronald J Krause	84
11	Bob Jolly	3	Holden VS Commodore	Bob Jolly	73
12	Mark Trenoweth	8	Jaguar XJS	Mark Trenoweth	59
13	Mark Stinson	13	Holden Calibra – Chevrolet	Australian Sports Sedan Association	52
14	Tony Wilson	27	Holden VS Commodore	The Smash Repair Centre	52
15	Peter O'Brien	17	Holden VL Commodore – Chevrolet	O'Brien Aluminium	48
16	Jeff Barnes	6	Pontiac Firebird Trans Am	Barnes High Performance	45
17	Joseph Said	9	Fiat 124 Coupe	Joseph Said	32
18	Norman Mogg	111	Holden VL Commodore	Norman Mogg	30
19	Stephen Lichtenberger	5	Mazda RX-7	Stephen Lichtenberger	29
20	Trent Young	11	Toyota Corolla	Trent Young	27
21	Simon Emmerling	11	BMW 635CSi		26
22	Ron O'Brien	18	Ford Sierra RS500 – Chevrolet; Holden VL Commodore	O'Brien Aluminium	26
23	Tony Hubbard	26	Holden Calibra	Tony Hubbard	24
24	Peter Hayes	28	Ford Capri	Peter Hayes	23
25	Graham Smith	16	Opel Calibra – Fiat	Graham Smith	23
26	Bruce Dee Boo	44	Mazda RX-7	Bruce Dee Boo	20
27	Dean Randle	33	Saab 900 Aero – Chevrolet	Dean Randle	19
28	Richard Catchlove	22	Mazda RX-7	Bill Emeny	16
29	Bill Martin	10	Mazda RX-7 – Chevrolet	Bill Martin	15
30	Mark Smith	29	Holden Gemini	Mark Smith	14
31	Barry Bray	36	Mazda RX-7	Barry Bray	13
32	Fred Axisa	80	Holden VK Commodore	Fred Axisa	11
33	Lee Nicolle	10	Holden Torana GTR XU-1	Lee Nicolle	10
34	Keith Carling	11	Mazda RX-7	Keith Carling	8
