= 2013 Kerrick Sports Sedan Series =

Motor racing competition

The 2013 Kerrick Sports Sedan Series was an Australian motor racing series open to Group 3D Sports Sedans and to Class TA Trans Am type cars. It was the tenth annual National Series to be held in Australia for Sports Sedans.

== Calendar ==
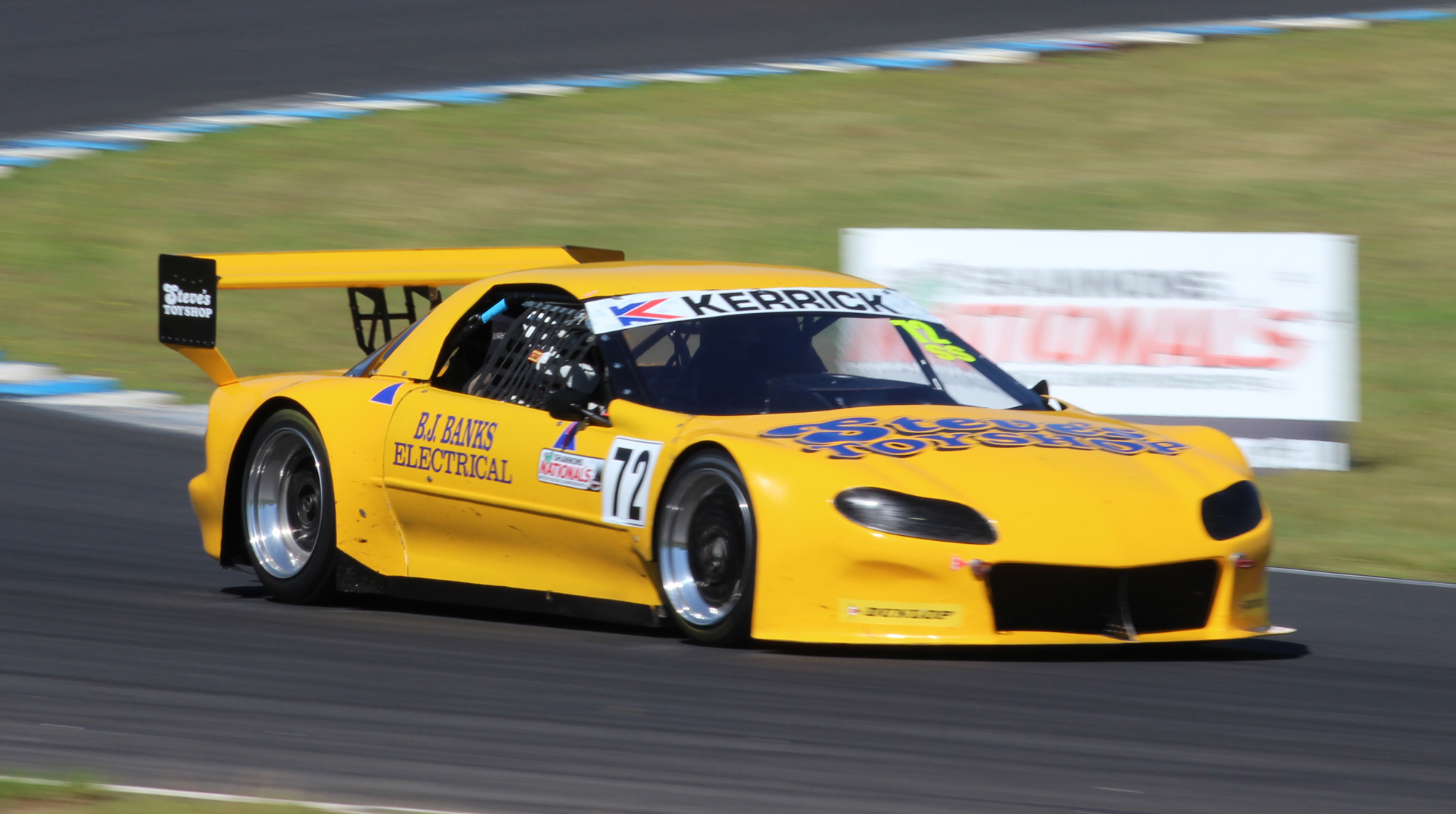
Bruce Banks won the series driving a Chevrolet Camaro (pictured), a Mazda RX-7 and a Chevrolet Corvette

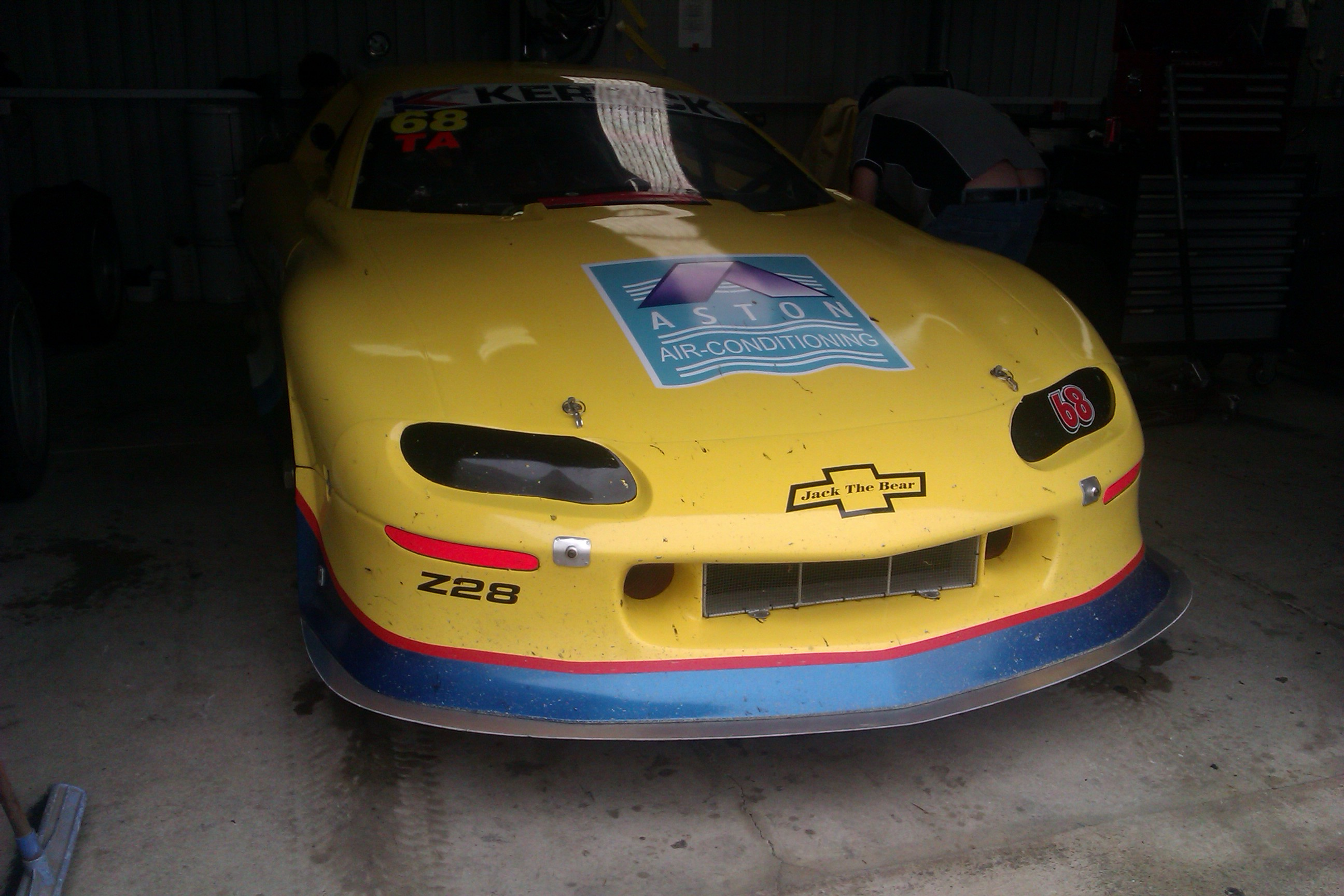
Shane Bradford placed third driving a Chevrolet Camaro

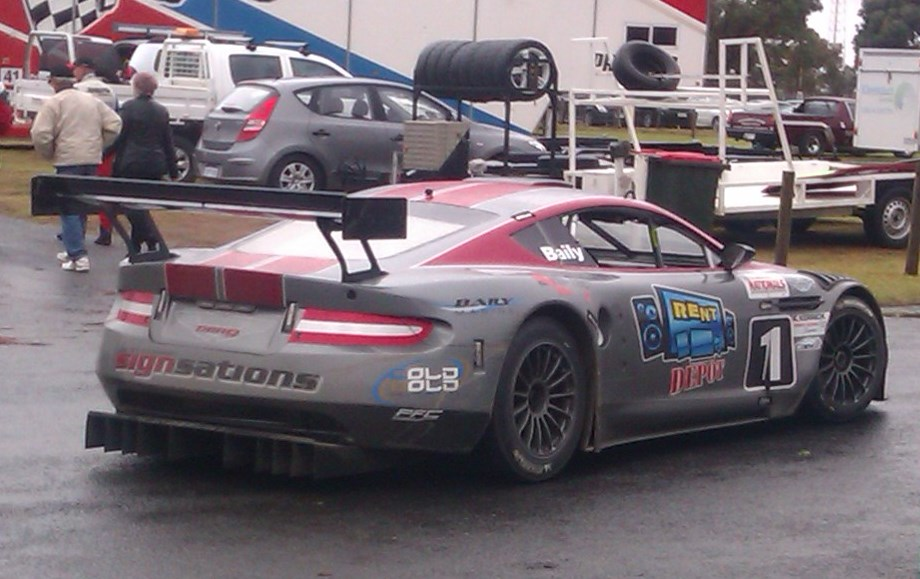
Kerry Baily placed fifth driving an Aston Martin DBR9

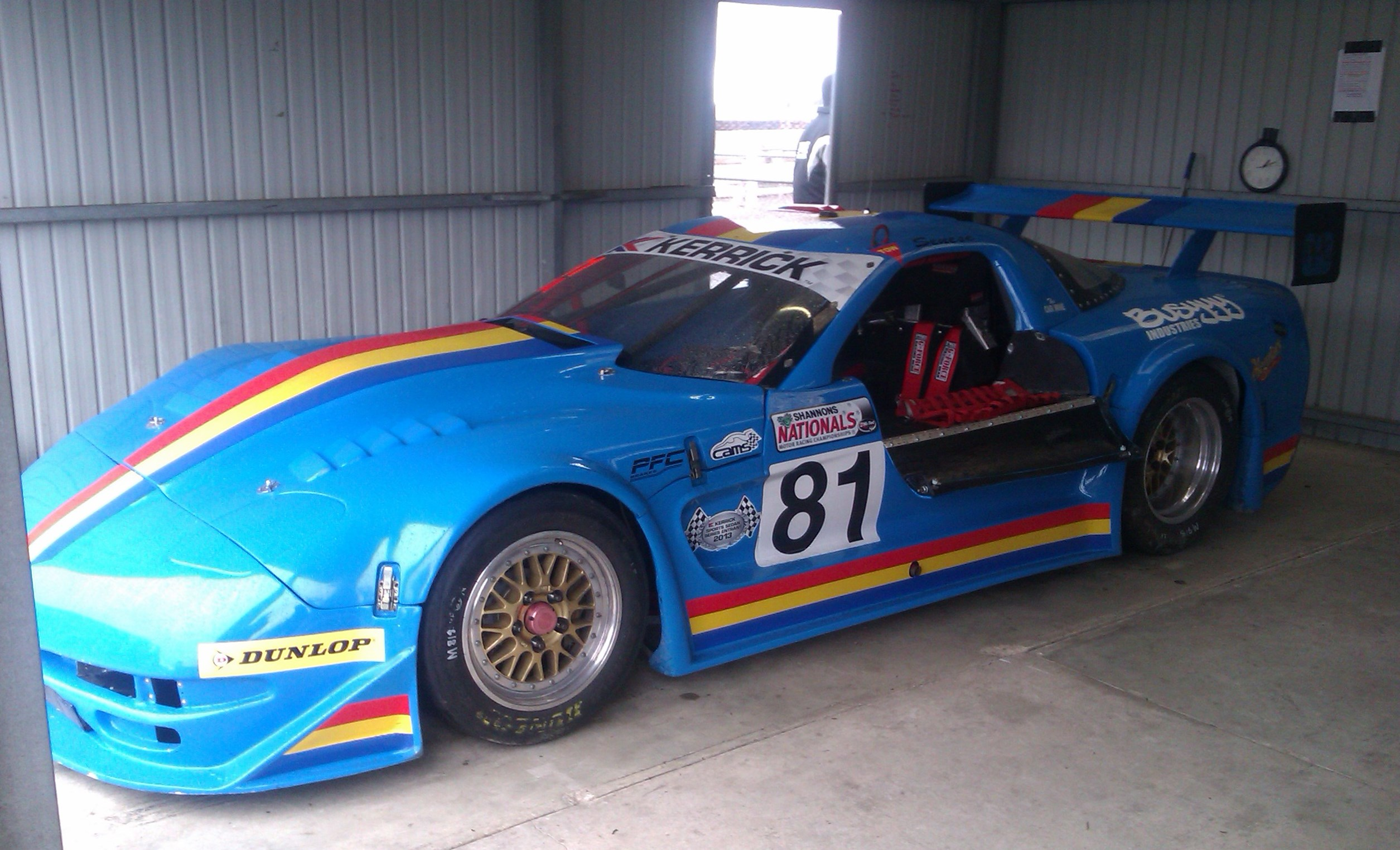
Charlie Senese placed eighth driving a Chevrolet Corvette

The series was contested over five rounds.

Round	Circuit	Date
1	Sydney Motorsport Park	22 – 24 March
2	Mallala Motor Sport Park	19 – 21 April
3	Queensland Raceway	2 – 4 August
4	Phillip Island	20 – 22 September
5	Sandown	15 – 17 November

== Series results ==
Position	Driver	No.	Car	Syd	Mal	Que	Phi	San	Total points
1	Bruce Banks	72; 56; 66	Chevrolet Camaro; Mazda RX-7; Chevrolet Corvette	101	103	106	109	110	529
2	Tony Ricciardello	5	Alfa Romeo Alfetta GTV Chevrolet	135	78	95	75	135	518
3	Shane Bradford	68	Chevrolet Camaro	98	108	109	82	106	503
4	Daniel Tamasi	9	Holden Calibra Chevrolet	108	92	60	102	63	425
5	Kerry Baily	1	Aston Martin DBR9 Chevrolet	122	112	121	24	0	379
6	Colin Smith	44	Holden Monaro Chevrolet	89	0	63	80	97	329
7	Darren Hossack	4	Audi A4	28	30	130	28	70	286
8	Charlie Senese	81	Chevrolet Corvette	0	0	50	81	84	215
9	Damian Johnson	19	Holden LJ Torana	71	0	0	68	73	212
10	Bob McLoughlin	51	Holden VS Commodore	0	72	48	91	0	211
11	Jeff Barnes	38	Pontiac Firebird Trans Am	55	125	18	0	0	198
12	Michael Robinson	32	Holden Monaro	0	0	42	72	0	114
13	Tony Cox	14	Saab 9-3 Aero Dodge	24	0	79	0	0	103
14	Dameon Jameson	45	Jaguar XKR Chevrolet	0	95	0	0	0	95
15	Peter Beninca	11	Alfa Romeo Alfetta GTV	0	0	0	0	93	93
16	Phil Crompton	21	Ford Mustang	0	0	74	0	0	74
17	Dean Camm	66	Chevrolet Corvette	0	0	0	52	0	52
18	Garry Aston	55	Holden VC Commodore	0	0	37	0	0	37
19	Peter McLeod	50	Mazda RX-7	0	0	0	0	0	0
20	Shane Hart	8	Mazda RX-7	0	0	0	0	0	0
