= 1992 Australian Sports Sedan Championship =

Motor racing competition

The 1992 Australian Sports Sedan Championship was a CAMS sanctioned motor racing title for Sports Sedans. The championship, which was the 8th Australian Sports Sedan Championship, was won by Tasmanian Kerry Baily driving a Toyota Celica Supra.

== Calendar ==
The championship was contested over a twelve-round series with one race per round.

Round	Circuit	State	Date	Winning driver	Winning car
1	Symmons Plains	Tasmania	26 April	Greg Crick	Honda Prelude Chevrolet
2	Symmons Plains	Tasmania	26 April	Greg Crick	Honda Prelude Chevrolet
3	Lakeside	Queensland	5 July	Kerry Baily	Toyota Celica Supra Chevrolet
4	Lakeside	Queensland	5 July	Kerry Baily	Toyota Celica Supra Chevrolet
5	Eastern Creek	New South Wales	2 August	Kerry Baily	Toyota Celica Supra Chevrolet
6	Eastern Creek	New South Wales	2 August	Kerry Baily	Toyota Celica Supra Chevrolet
7	Mallala	South Australia	9 August	Brian Smith	Alfa Romeo Alfetta GTV Chevrolet
8	Mallala	South Australia	9 August	Brian Smith	Alfa Romeo Alfetta GTV Chevrolet
9	Sandown	Victoria	13 September	Brian Smith	Alfa Romeo Alfetta GTV Chevrolet
10	Sandown	Victoria	13 September	Brian Smith	Alfa Romeo Alfetta GTV Chevrolet
11	Mount Panorama	New South Wales	2 October	Keith Carling	Nissan 300ZX
12	Mount Panorama	New South Wales	3 October	Keith Carling	Nissan 300ZX

== Championship results ==
Position	Driver	No.	Car	Points
1	Kerry Baily	28	Toyota Celica Supra Chevrolet	179
2	Brian Smith	5	Alfa Romeo Alfetta GTV Chevrolet	159
3	Des Wall	48	Toyota Supra Chevrolet	127
4	Keith Carling	14	Nissan 300ZX	84
5	Michael Elliott	42	Fiat 124 Coupé	44
6	Greg Crick	1	Honda Prelude Chevrolet	40
7	Jeff Barnes	6	Chevrolet Monza	22
8	Mick Monterosso	2	Holden VP Commodore Chevrolet	20
=	Russell Stenhouse	97	Holden LX Torana A9X	20
10	Bob Jolly	3	Holden VK Commodore Chevrolet	16
11	Bill Napham	76	Mazda RX-7	15
12	Grant Jarrett	21	Nissan Bluebird	14
13	Graham Smith	61	Fiat 131	12
=	Joe Said	9	Fiat 124 Coupé	12
15	Geoff Munday	17	Alfa Romeo Alfetta GTV	10
=	Bruce Banks	13	Mazda RX-7	10
=	Clive Smith	55	Nissan Skyline DR30 RS	10
=	John Briggs	51	Honda Prelude Chevrolet	10
19	Ken Nelson	81	Rover Vitesse	9
=	Tino Leo	85	Holden HQ Monaro	9
21	David Attard	66	Holden VL Commodore Chevrolet	8
=	Kevin Clark	16	Ford Mustang	8
23	Cos Monterosso	69	Ford Escort Chevrolet	7
24	Graham Neilson	43	Mazda RX-7	6
=	Stephen Bell	86	Mitsubishi Starion	6
=	Brian Wilshire	94	Fiat 124	6
=	Stewart Douglas	64	Holden EH	6
=	Hugh Harrison	46	Alfa Romeo GTV6	6
29	Eric Purtill	99	Isuzu Gemini	5
=	Mike Imrie	7	Saab 900 Aero Chevrolet	5
=	Warren Smith	77	Rover Vitesse	5
=	Barry Bray	36	Nissan Gazelle	5
33	Richard Birks	10	Alfa Romeo Alfetta GTV	4
=	James Rosenberg	38	Holden LH Torana	4
=	Kevin Heffernan	32	Holden VL Commodore	4
36	Michael West	61	Holden Commodore	2
37	Rodney Wright	95	Mazda RX-3	1
