= 2025 National Sports Sedan Series =

Australian motorsport championship season

The 2025 National Sports Sedan Series, known as the Precision National Sports Sedan Series after its title sponsor, was a motor racing series for Australian Sports Sedans. The series has very liberal regulations allowing a broad range of custom-built racing cars to participate, with the proviso that they have bodywork resembling a road car. A national competition for sports sedans dates to 1976, and the present series to 2004.

The series was sanctioned by Motorsport Australia, and its naming rights sponsor is Precision International, a supplier of specialty parts for racing engines.

The series was won by Steven Tomasi driving a Holden Calibra.

== Calendar ==
The five-round series consisted of four rounds as part of the Trophy Tour, a new series of motor racing events organised by local clubs, racing circuits, and coordinated by Motorsport Australia, and a single round supporting the GT World Challenge Australia category organised by SRO Motorsports Group.

Round	Circuit	Dates	Supporting	Map
1	(New South Wales) Sydney Motorsport Park	21–23 March	Motorsport Australia Trophy Tour	2025 National Sports Sedan Series is located in Australia
2	Queensland Raceway	30 May—1 June	Shannons SpeedSeries	2025 National Sports Sedan Series is located in Australia
3	(Victoria (state)) Winton Raceway	22–24 August	Trico Victorian State Circuit Racing Championship	2025 National Sports Sedan Series is located in Australia
4	(South Australia) The Bend Motorsport Park	25–26 October	The Bend Classic	2025 National Sports Sedan Series is located in Australia
5	(Victoria (state)) Phillip Island Grand Prix Circuit	21–23 November	Island Magic	2025 National Sports Sedan Series is located in Australia
