= 1994 Australian Sports Sedan Championship =

Motor racing competition

The 1994 Australian Sports Sedan Championship was a CAMS sanctioned motor racing title for drivers of Sports Sedans complying with Group 2D regulations. The title, which was the tenth Australian Sports Sedan Championship, was contested over two eight lap races held at the Sandown circuit in Victoria, Australia on 4 September 1994.

The championship was won by Brian Smith driving an Alfa Romeo Alfetta GTV Chevrolet.

== Results ==
| Position | Driver | No. | Car | Entrant | R1 Pos | R2 Pos |
|---|---|---|---|---|---|---|
| 1 | Brian Smith | 5 | Alfa Romeo Alfetta GTV Chevrolet | Basil Ricciardello | 2 | 1 |
| 2 | Barry Jameson | 45 | Ford Falcon (EB) Chevrolet | Barry Jameson | 1 | 3 |
| 3 | Kerry Baily | 1 | Toyota Celica Supra Chevrolet | Kerry Baily | 4 | 2 |
| ? | Des Wall | 26 | Toyota Supra Chevrolet | Des Wall | 6 | 4 |
| ? | Bob Jolly | 3 | Holden Commodore (VK) Chevrolet | Bob Jolly | 5 | 5 |
| ? | David Attard | 49 | Holden VL Commodore SS Chevrolet | Bob Tindal | 3 | DNS |
| ? | Cameron McLean | 13 | BMW M3 | Jones McLean Motorsports | ? | 6 |
| ? | Bill Emeny | 20 | Nissan Stanza Coupe | Whitehorse Truck Parts | ? | 7 |
| ? | Tino Leo | 85 | Holden Monaro GTS | Tino Leo | ? | 8 |
| ? | Ivan Mikac | 41 | Mazda RX-7 | Ivan Mikac | ? | 9 |
| ? | Bryan Thomson | 17 | Mercedes-Benz 450SLC Chevrolet | Bryan G Thomson | ? | 10 |
| ? | James Philip | 55 | Honda Prelude | James Philip | ? | ? |

Note:

- There were thirty six entries for the championship
- There were thirty two starters.
- Only entries known to have started in at least one race are shown on the above table
- The precise method of determining final championship positions is not known
