= 2018 National Sports Sedan Series =

Motor racing competition

The 2018 National Sports Sedan Series was an Australian motor racing competition open to Sports Sedans and Trans Am type automobiles. It was sanctioned by the Confederation of Australian Motor Sport (CAMS) as an Authorised Series, with Sports Sedans Pty Ltd appointed as the Category Manager by CAMS.

The series was won by Steven Tamasi, driving Holden Calibra.

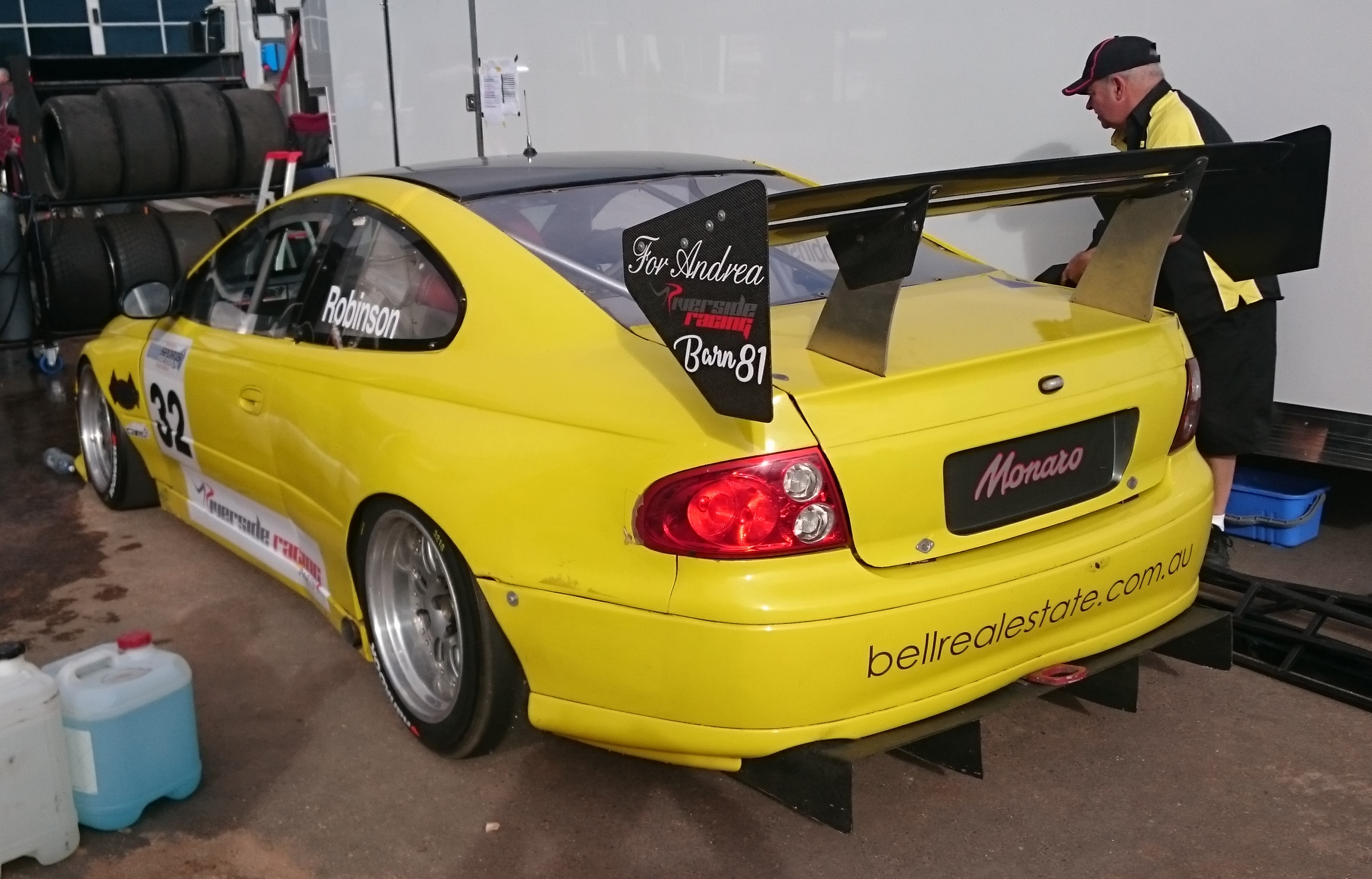
Michael Robinson placed second in the series driving a Holden Monaro

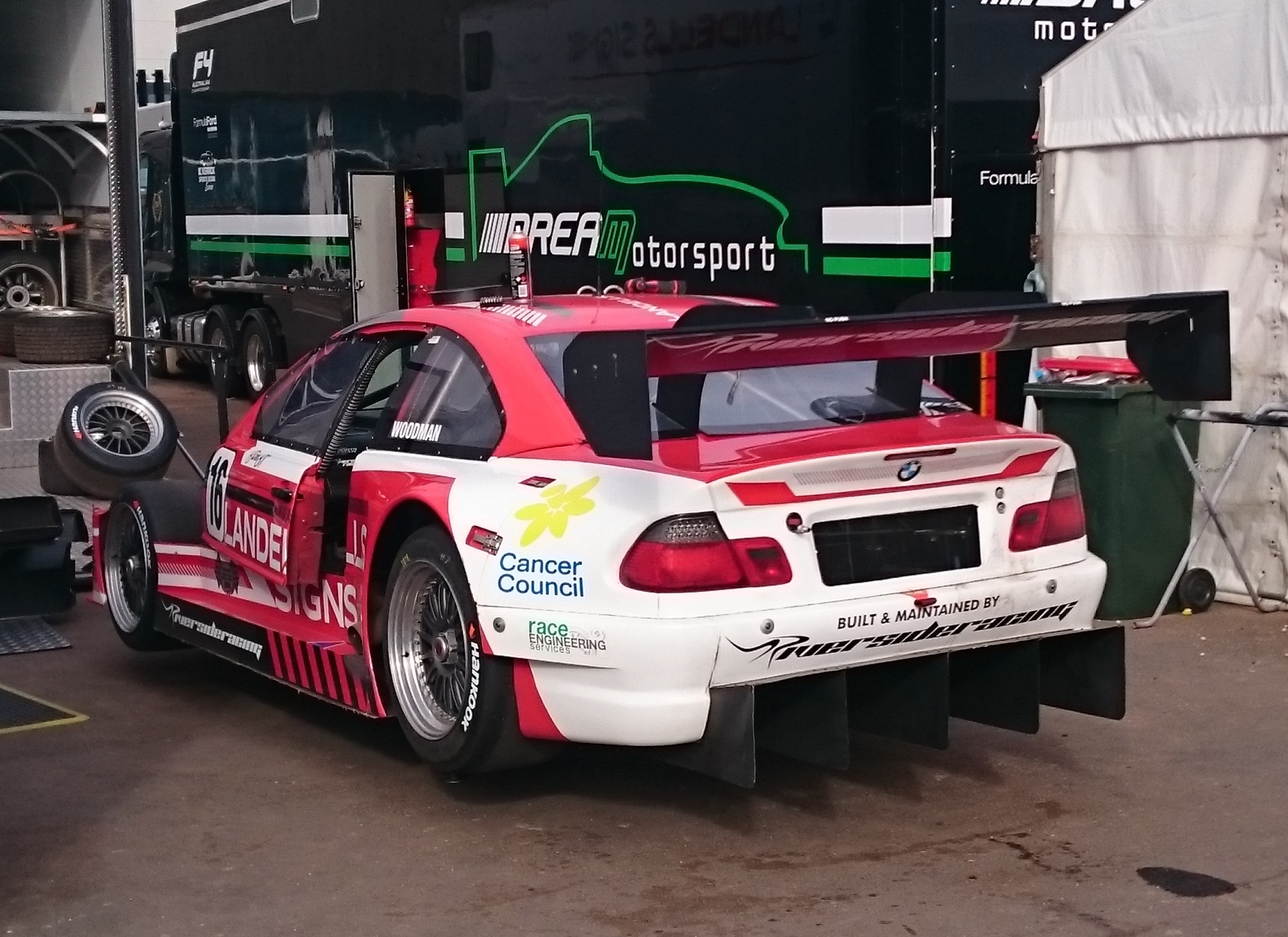
Shane Woodman placed third driving a BMW M3 GTR
