= Ford Falcon =

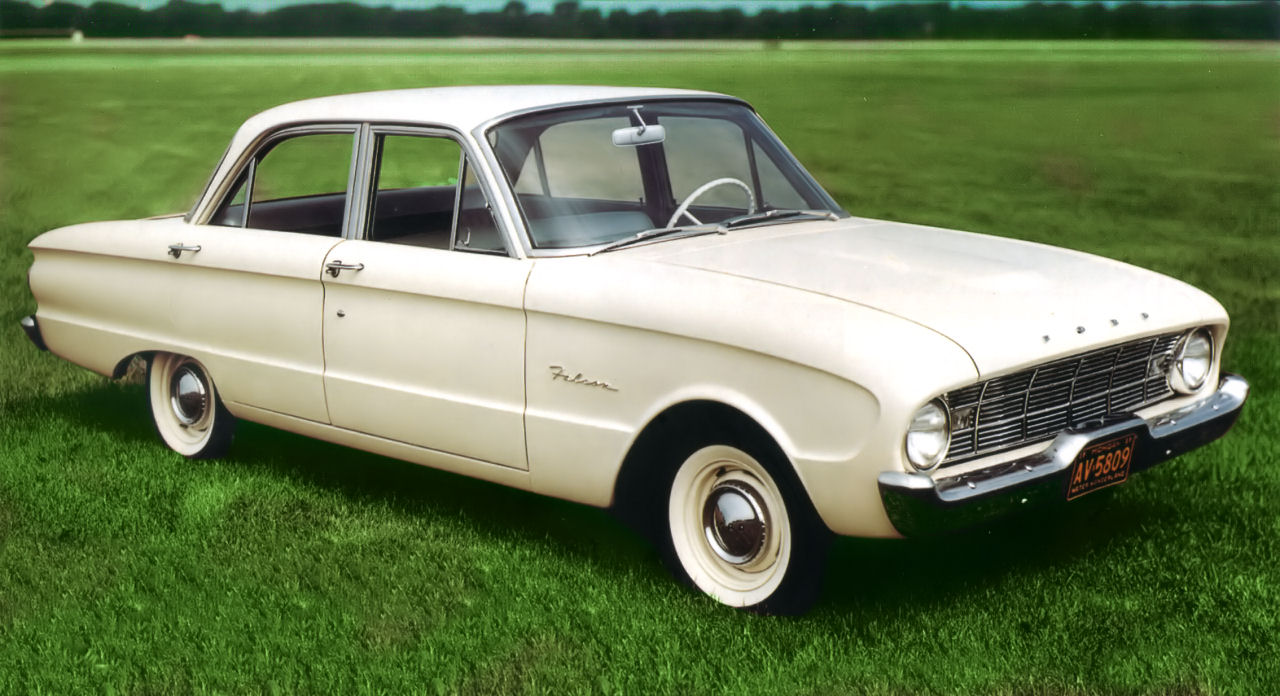
A 1960 Ford Falcon (North America)

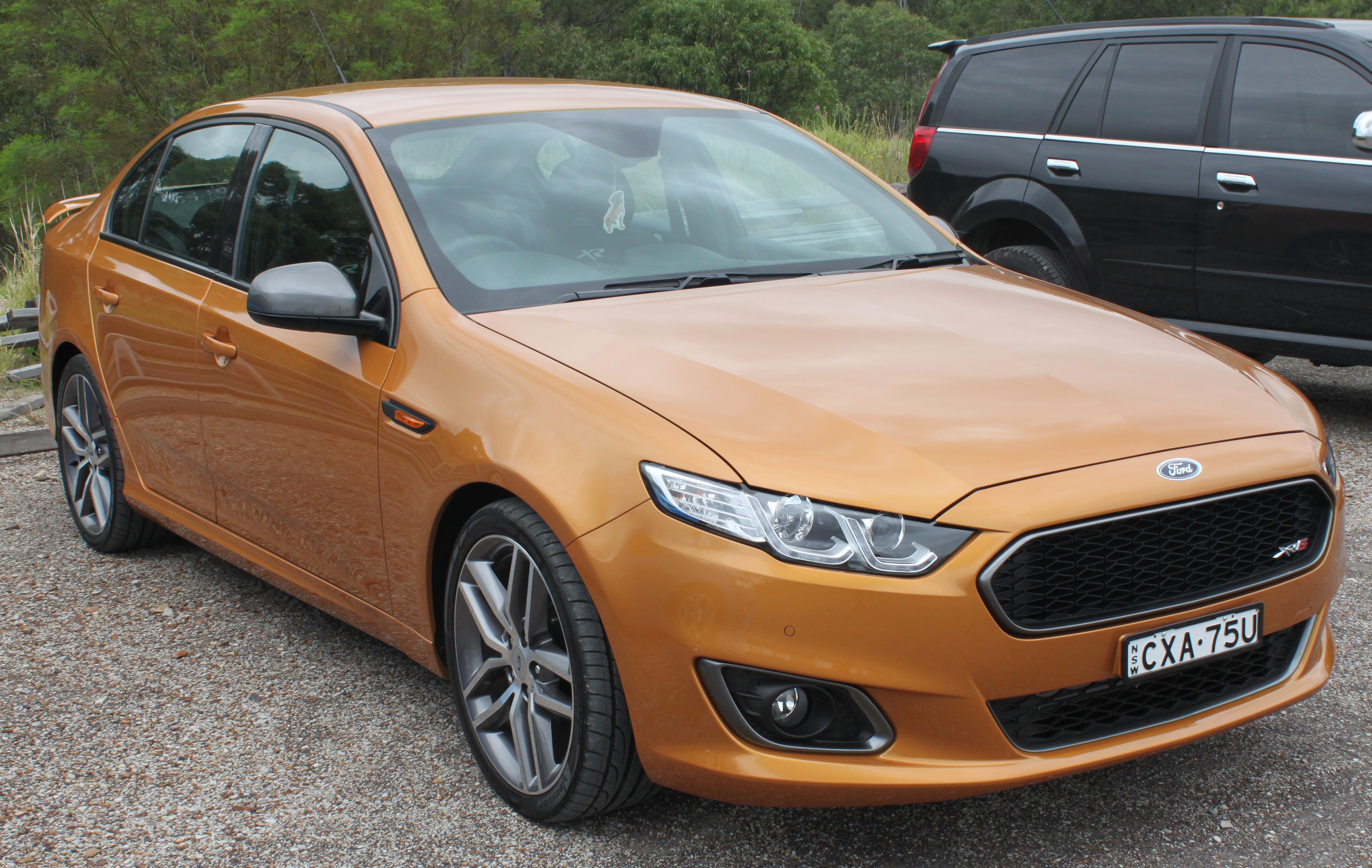
The final Ford Falcon, the Australian FG-X series

The Ford Falcon is an automotive nameplate used by Ford on numerous models worldwide.

- Ford Falcon (Australia), a car manufactured by Ford Australia from 1960 to 2016
- Ford Falcon (North America), an automobile produced by Ford from 1960 to 1970
- Ford Falcon (Argentina), a car built by Ford Argentina from 1962 until 1991
- Ford Falcon van, a passenger variant of the first generation Ford E Series van (based on the Falcon platform) produced by Ford in the 1960s.
