= National Sports Sedan Series =

Australian motor racing title

- Category: Silhouette racing car
- Country: Australia
- Inaugural season: 1976
- Drivers' champion: Tony Ricciardello
- Official website: National Sports Sedan Series

The National Sports Sedans Series, formerly the Australian Sports Sedan Championship, is a Motorsport Australia-sanctioned national motor racing title for drivers of cars complying with Australian Sports Sedan regulations. This class, essentially a silhouette racing car class, permits three types of cars:

- Purpose-built steel spaceframe racing cars with bodywork resembling a production car sold in Australia
- Cars based on production street car bodies.
- Purpose-built race cars constructed for the American Trans-Am Series.

Beyond these basic requirements, there are relatively few restrictions on engines, drivetrains, aerodynamics, or other performance-enhancing components.

The relatively relaxed regulations mean that Sports Sedans are the fastest domestic "tin-top" racing series in Australia. At circuits such as Mount Panorama, Queensland Raceway, Phillip Island, the Sports Sedan lap record is at least a second, and usually several seconds, faster than Supercars, despite the latter being a fully professional series generally regarded as featuring Australia's best local drivers.

The category emerged following the replacement of Appendix J Touring Cars by the more restricted Group C Improved Production Touring Cars at the end of 1964. Promoters of circuits such as Winton and Oran Park then allowed the redundant Appendix J cars to run with Sports Cars under the name Sports Racing Closed. By 1966 cars were competing with extensive modifications, often including engine swaps. By 1971 restrictions were placed on bodywork modifications ensuring that the original silhouette of the car had to be maintained. The term Sports Sedans had been in common usage for the cars and in 1973 CAMS gave the name official recognition when it introduced Group B Sports Sedans as a new racing classification. The category officially became Group 2D Sports Sedans in 1988, and Group 3D Sports Sedans in 2000.

An Australia-wide championship was run each year from 1976 to 1981. It was discontinued for 1982 with the introduction of an Australian GT Championship, although Sports Sedans were invited to compete in this new series, which many did as it was the only national series their cars were eligible for, but the older Sports Sedans were generally un-competitive against the new GT cars such as the Porsche 935 or the converted Chevrolet Monzas. While the power of the top Sports Sedans, which generally ran 5.0L or 6.0L Chevrolet V8 engines, was not far shy of the GT cars, the Sports Sedans were restricted to running 10" wheels while the GT cars such as the 935's were allowed up to 18" of rubber. This gave the GT cars far greater stability and enabled them to go much faster through turns. The Sports Sedan category itself was retained for state level racing. The Australian Sports Sedan Championship title was revived in 1991 and was contested annually through to 2003. Each championship was decided over a series of races, with the exception of the 1994 title, which was contested over two races at one meeting at Sandown Raceway in Victoria.

A National Series for Sports Sedans replaced the Australian Sports Sedan Championship for 2004 and has been included in the CAMS Nationals Racing Championships (now known as the Shannons Nationals Motor Racing Championships) since its inception in 2006.

== List of champions ==
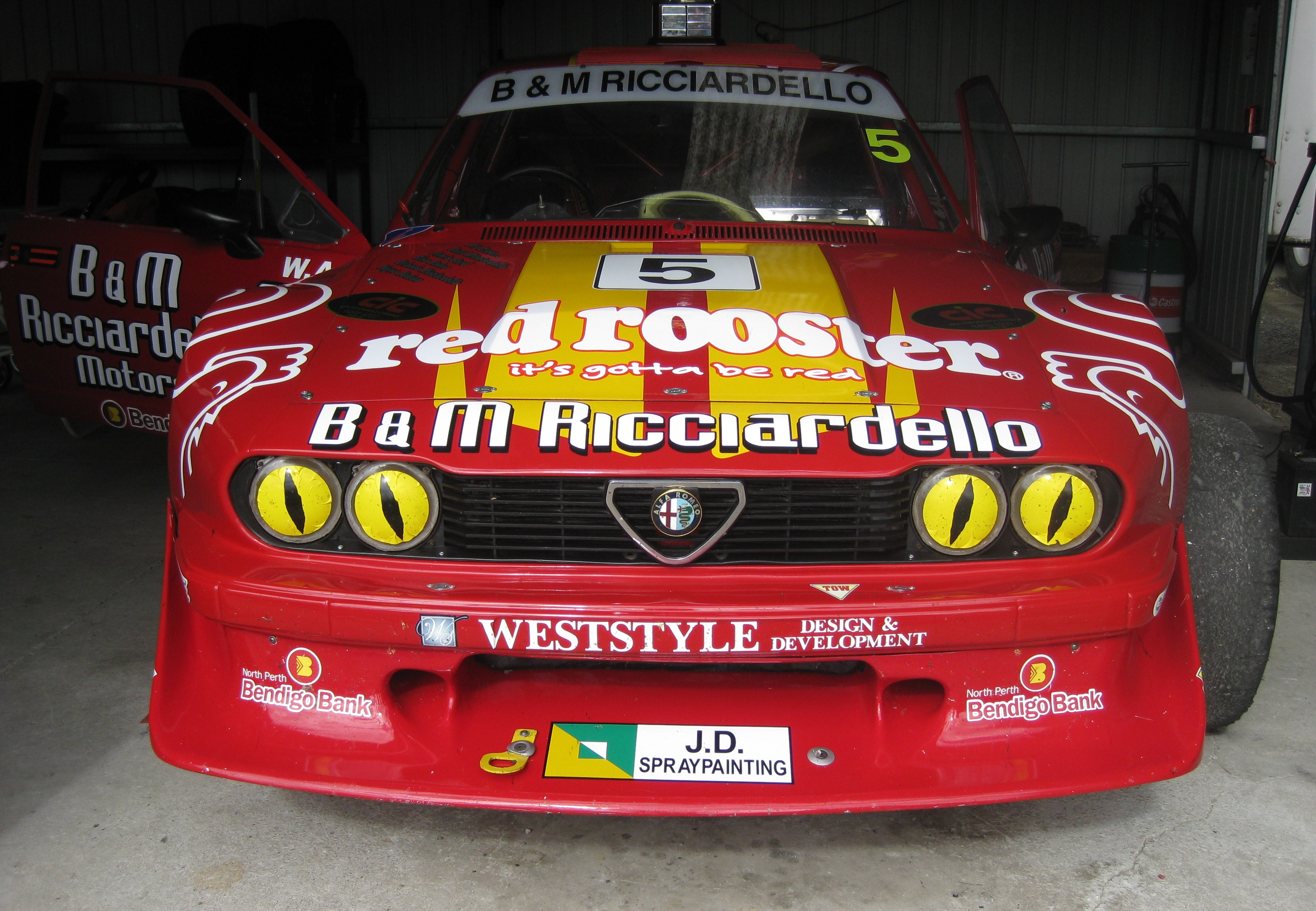
The Alfa Romeo Alfetta GTV of Tony Ricciardello at Mallala Motor Sport Park for the opening round of the 2011 Kerrick Sports Sedan Series. Ricciardello has won the Australian Sports Sedan Championship four times and the National Sports Sedan Series eight times.

Winners of the Australian Sports Sedan Championship are shown below.

Year	Champion	Vehicle
1976	Allan Moffat	Chevrolet Monza; Ford Capri RS3100
1977	Frank Gardner	Chevrolet Corvair
1978	Allan Grice	Chevrolet Corvair
1979	Allan Grice	Chevrolet Corvair
1980	Tony Edmondson	Alfa Romeo Alfetta GTV-Repco Holden
1981	Tony Edmondson	Alfa Romeo Alfetta GTV-Chevrolet
Not held
1991	Greg Crick	Honda Prelude-Chevrolet
1992	Kerry Baily	Toyota Celica Supra-Chevrolet
1993	Kerry Baily	Toyota Celica Supra-Chevrolet
1994	Brian Smith	Alfa Romeo Alfetta GTV-Chevrolet
1995	Cameron McLean	BMW M3
1996	John Briggs	Honda Prelude-Chevrolet
1997	Kerry Baily	Toyota Celica Supra-Chevrolet
1998	Tony Ricciardello	Alfa Romeo Alfetta GTV-Chevrolet
1999	Tony Ricciardello	Alfa Romeo Alfetta GTV-Chevrolet
2000	Kerry Baily	Nissan 300ZX-Chevrolet
2001	Tony Ricciardello	Alfa Romeo Alfetta GTV-Chevrolet
2002	Tony Ricciardello	Alfa Romeo Alfetta GTV-Chevrolet
2003	Kerry Baily	Nissan 300ZX-Chevrolet

== National Sports Sedan Series ==
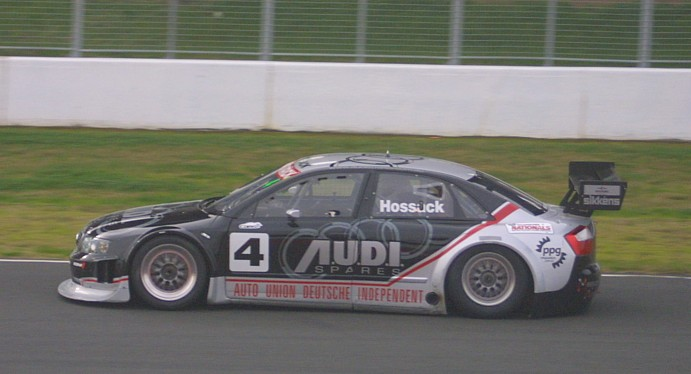
Darren Hossack (Audi A4 Chevrolet) during 2008 season

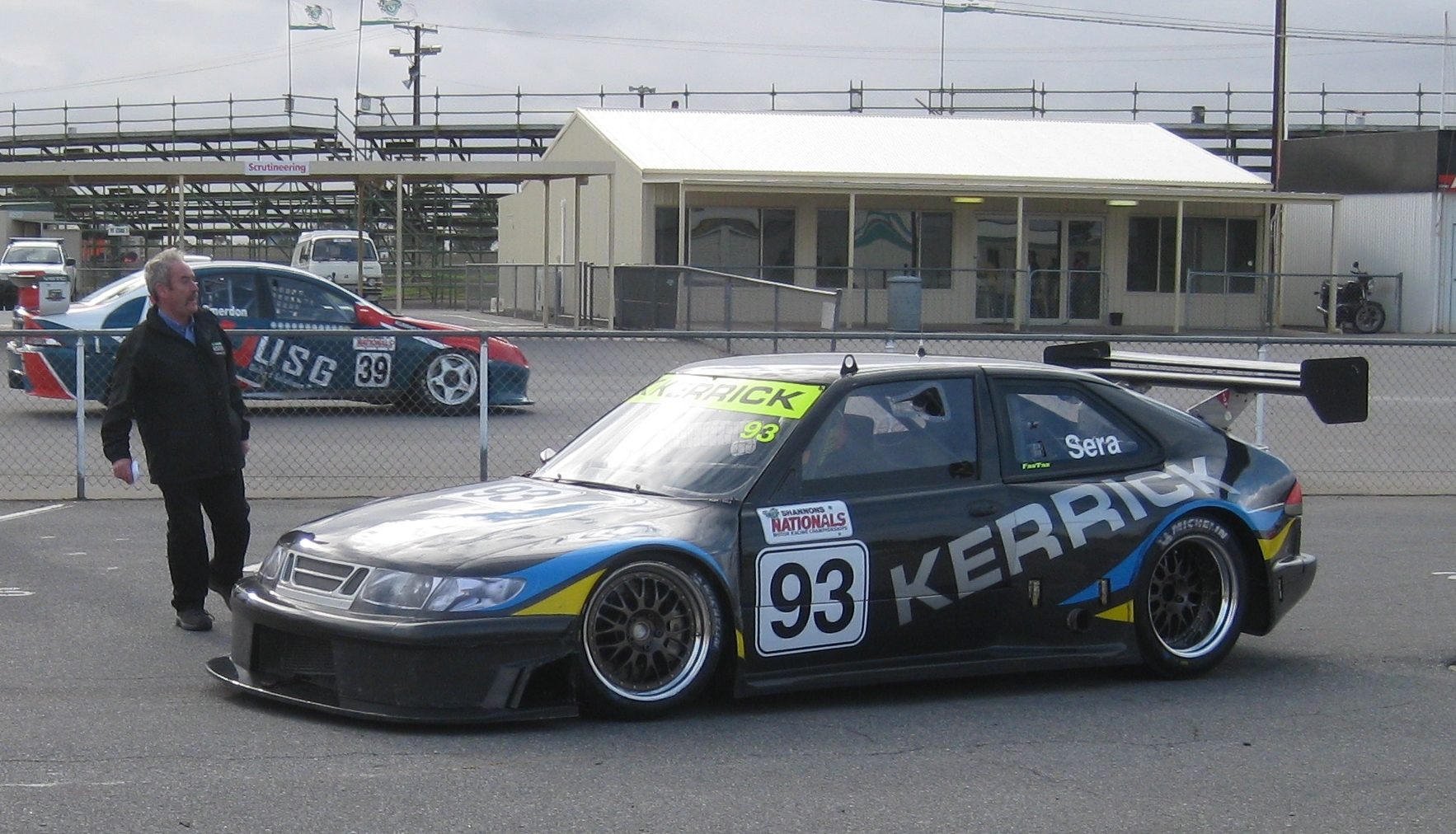
2010 Series winner James Sera (Saab 9-3) at Mallala Motor Sport Park. This car also won the series in 2006 driven by Dean Randle.

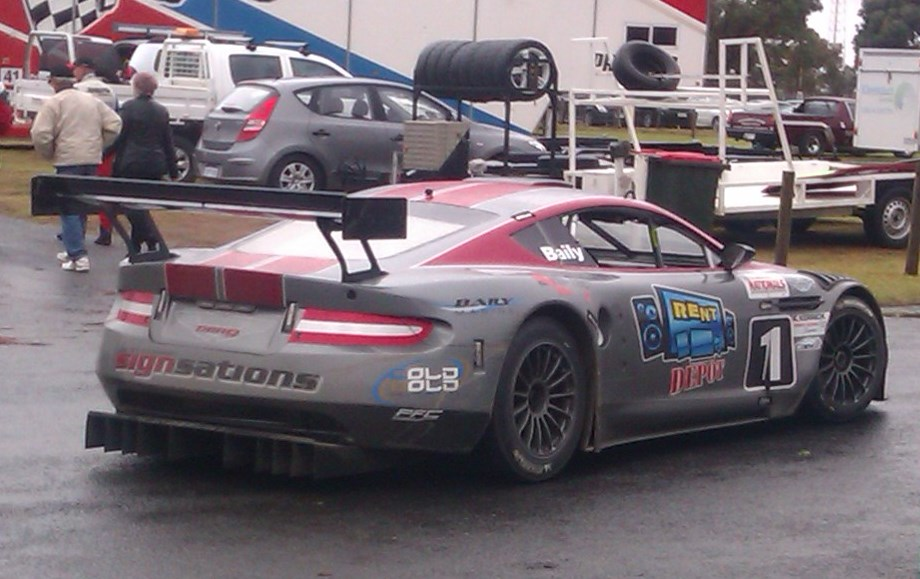
Kerry Baily won the 2012 Kerrick Sports Sedan Series driving an Aston Martin DBRS9

A Sports Sedan series has been run each year from 2004, this being recognised by CAMS as a National Series rather than as an official Australian Championship. Each series has been open to cars built to American Trans-Am or New Zealand TraNZam rules as well as cars complying with CAMS Group 3D Sports Sedan regulations.

Series winners have been :

Series	Winner	Vehicle
2004 Tranzam Sports Sedan Series	Darren Hossack	Saab 9-3-Chevrolet
2005 Tranzam Sports Sedan Series	Tony Ricciardello	Alfa Romeo Alfetta GTV-Chevrolet
2006 Kerrick Sports Sedan Series	Dean Randle	Saab 9-3-Chevrolet
2007 Kerrick Sports Sedan Series	Tony Ricciardello	Alfa Romeo Alfetta GTV-Chevrolet
2008 Kerrick Sports Sedan Series	Darren Hossack	Audi A4-Chevrolet
2009 Kerrick Sports Sedan Series	Des Wall	Chevrolet Corvette-Chevrolet
2010 Kerrick Sports Sedan Series	James Sera	Saab 9-3-Chevrolet
2011 Kerrick Sports Sedan Series	Tony Ricciardello	Alfa Romeo Alfetta GTV-Chevrolet
2012 Kerrick Sports Sedan Series	Kerry Baily	Aston Martin DBR9-Chevrolet
2013 Kerrick Sports Sedan Series	Bruce Banks	Chevrolet Camaro; Mazda RX-7 turbo Chevrolet Corvette
2014 Kerrick Sports Sedan Series	Tony Ricciardello	Alfa Romeo Alfetta GTV-Chevrolet
2015 Kerrick Sports Sedan Series	Tony Ricciardello	Alfa Romeo GTV-Chevrolet
2015 Kerrick Sports Sedan Series	Tony Ricciardello	Alfa Romeo GTV-Chevrolet
2016 Kerrick Sports Sedan Series	Tony Ricciardello	Alfa Romeo GTV-Chevrolet
2017 National Sports Sedan Series	Birol Cetin	Chevrolet Camaro
2018 National Sports Sedan Series	Steven Tamasi	Holden Calibra
2019 National Sports Sedan Series	Tony Ricciardello	Alfa Romeo Alfetta GTV-Chevrolet
2020–21 Not held
2022 National Sports Sedan Series	Jordan Caruso	Audi A4-Chevrolet
2023 National Sports Sedan Series	Tony Ricciardello	Alfa Romeo Alfetta GTV-Chevrolet
2024 National Sports Sedan Series	Peter Ingram	Mazda RX-7
2025 National Sports Sedan Series	Steven Tamasi	Holden Calibra
