= 1991 Australian Sports Sedan Championship =

Motor racing season

The 1991 Australian Sports Sedan Championship was a CAMS sanctioned motor racing title open to Sports Sedans. It was the 7th Australian Sports Sedan Championship and the first to be awarded since 1981. The championship was won by Greg Crick driving a Honda Prelude Chevrolet.

== Calendar ==
The championship was contested over a fourteen round series with one race per round.

Round	Circuit	State	Date	Winning driver	Car
1	Sandown	Victoria	19 May	Domenic Beninca	Alfa Romeo Alfetta GTV
2	Sandown	Victoria	19 May	Domenic Beninca	Alfa Romeo Alfetta GTV
3	Eastern Creek	New South Wales	26 May	Mick Monterosso	Ford Escort Mark II Chevrolet
4	Eastern Creek	New South Wales	26 May	Mick Monterosso	Ford Escort Mark II Chevrolet
5	Eastern Creek	New South Wales	21 July	Mick Monterosso	Ford Escort Mark II Chevrolet
6	Eastern Creek	New South Wales	21 July	Mick Monterosso	Ford Escort Mark II Chevrolet
7	Mallala	South Australia	4 August	Mick Monterosso	Ford Escort Mark II Chevrolet
8	Mallala	South Australia	4 August	Greg Crick	Honda Prelude Chevrolet
9	Eastern Creek	New South Wales	25 August	Greg Crick	Honda Prelude Chevrolet
10	Eastern Creek	New South Wales	25 August	Kerry Baily	Toyota Celica Supra Chevrolet
11	Lakeside	Queensland	15 September	Mick Monterosso	Ford Escort Mark II Chevrolet
12	Lakeside	Queensland	15 September	Des Wall	Toyota Supra Chevrolet
13	Eastern Creek	New South Wales	29 September	Greg Crick	Honda Prelude Chevrolet
14	Eastern Creek	New South Wales	29 September	Greg Crick	Honda Prelude Chevrolet

== Points system ==
Championship points were awarded on a 20-15-12-10-8-6-4-3-2-1 basis for the first ten places at each round.

== Results ==
				Sandown		Eastern Creek		Eastern Creek		Mallala		Eastern Creek		Lakeside		Eastern Creek		
Position	Driver	No.	Car	R1	R2	R3	R4	R5	R6	R7	R8	R9	R10	R11	R12	R13	R14	Total
1	Greg Crick	12	Honda Prelude Chevrolet	15	-	15	20	15	12	6	20	20	-	10	5	20	20	178
2	Mick Monterosso	69	Ford Escort Mark II Chevrolet	-	8	20	-	20	20	20	15	-	-	20	7.5	15	-	145.5
3	Des Wall	48	Toyota Supra Chevrolet	10	12	3	6	6	15	10	-	15	12	15	10	6	10	130
4	Kerry Baily	28	Toyota Celica Supra Chevrolet	-	-	-	-	10	6	-	-	12	20	12	4	10	15	89
5	Brian Smith	5	Alfa Romeo Alfetta GTV Chevrolet	8	-	12	10	8	8	12	10	-	2	-	-	8	8	86
6	Domenic Beninca	52	Alfa Romeo Alfetta GTV	20	20	6	-	12	-	15	8	-	-	-	-	-	-	81
7	Gary Scott	8	Jaguar XJS	6	4	10	15	-	-	-	-	-	15	-	6	12	12	80
8	Keith Carling	14	Mazda RX-7 Nissan, Holden Commodore Chevrolet	-	15	8	-	-	-	4	6	-	-	-	-	-	-	33
=	Barry Jameson	45	Ford EA Falcon Chevrolet	12	-	2	-	3	3	-	-	10	-	-	-	-	3	33
10	Bob Jolly	3	Holden VK Commodore Chevrolet	-	-	4	8	-	-	8	12	-	-	-	-	-	-	32
11	Ian Luff	13	Holden VN Commodore Chevrolet	-	-	-	-	4	4	-	-	-	10	-	-	4	4	26
12	Graham Neilsen	15	Mazda RX-7	-	-	-	-	2	2	-	-	8	8	3	0.5	-	-	23.5
13	Terry Shiel	11	Mazda RX-7	-	-	1	12	-	10	-	-	-	-	-	-	-	-	23
14	Jeff Barnes	6	Chevrolet Monza	-	-	-	-	-	-	-	-	-	-	8	3	-	6	17
15	Robin Doherty	9	Ford XB Falcon Chevrolet	4	10	-	-	-	-	-	-	-	-	-	-	-	-	14
16	Ken Nelson	81	Rover Vitesse	-	-	-	-	-	-	-	-	6	4	2	1	-	-	13
17	David Attard	84	Datsun 1600	-	-	-	-	-	-	-	-	4	6	-	-	-	-	10
18	Tino Leo	85	Holden HQ Monaro Chevrolet	2	6	-	-	-	-	-	-	-	-	-	-	-	-	8
=	John White	65	Chevrolet Monza	-	-	-	-	-	-	-	-	-	-	6	2	-	-	8
20	Shawn Donnelly	25	Holden Commodore	-	-	-	3	-	-	-	-	-	-	-	-	2	1	6
=	John Cook	20	Mazda RX-7	-	-	-	-	-	-	3	3	-	-	-	-	-	-	6
=	Noel Davis	64	Holden Commodore	-	-	-	-	-	-	-	-	3	3	-	-	-	-	6
23	Terry Skene	24	Holden VH Commodore	-	-	-	-	-	-	-	-	-	-	4	1.5	-	-	5.5
24	Garry McFadyen	93	Holden Torana	-	-	-	-	-	-	-	-	-	-	-	-	3	2	5
25	Tony Hubbard	26	Holden VP Commodore Chevrolet	1	3	-	-	-	-	-	-	-	-	-	-	-	-	4
=	Bob Tindal	49	Holden VL Commodore Chevrolet	-	-	-	4	-	-	-	-	-	-	-	-	-	-	4
=	Cos Monterosso	2	Holden VP Commodore Chevrolet	-	-	-	-	-	-	-	4	-	-	-	-	-	-	4
28	Laurie Attard	71	Ford Capri Chevrolet	3	-	-	-	-	-	-	-	-	-	-	-	-	-	3
=	Mike Griffin	21	Mazda RX-7	-	-	-	-	1	1	-	-	-	-	-	-	1	-	3
=	Lee Nicolle	10	Holden LJ Torana Chevrolet	-	-	-	-	-	-	2	1	-	-	-	-	-	-	3
=	James Rosenberg	38	Holden LH Torana	-	-	-	-	-	-	1	2	-	-	-	-	-	-	3
32	Laurie Nelson	29	Ford Mustang	-	2	-	-	-	-	-	-	-	-	-	-	-	-	2
=	Bill Harris	92	Holden Torana	-	-	-	2	-	-	-	-	-	-	-	-	-	-	2
=	Rodney Brown	98	Holden EH	-	-	-	-	-	-	-	-	2	-	-	-	-	-	2
35	Hugh Harrison	46	Alfa Romeo Alfetta GTV	-	1	-	-	-	-	-	-	-	-	-	-	-	-	1
=	Les Butler	56	Holden Commodore	-	-	-	1	-	-	-	-	-	-	-	-	-	-	1
=	Ettore Vosolo	77	Toyota Celica	-	-	-	-	-	-	-	-	-	-	1	-	-	-	1

Note:

- The above table reflects the points awarded to each driver at each round as shown in Australian Motor Racing Year 1991/92 on pages 302 & 303. The final points listing shown on page 303 varies slightly from this.
- There were only nine finishers at Rounds 9 and 10.
- Round 12 at Lakeside was stopped due to an accident and only half points were awarded.
