= 1979 Australian Sports Sedan Championship =

Australian motor racing series

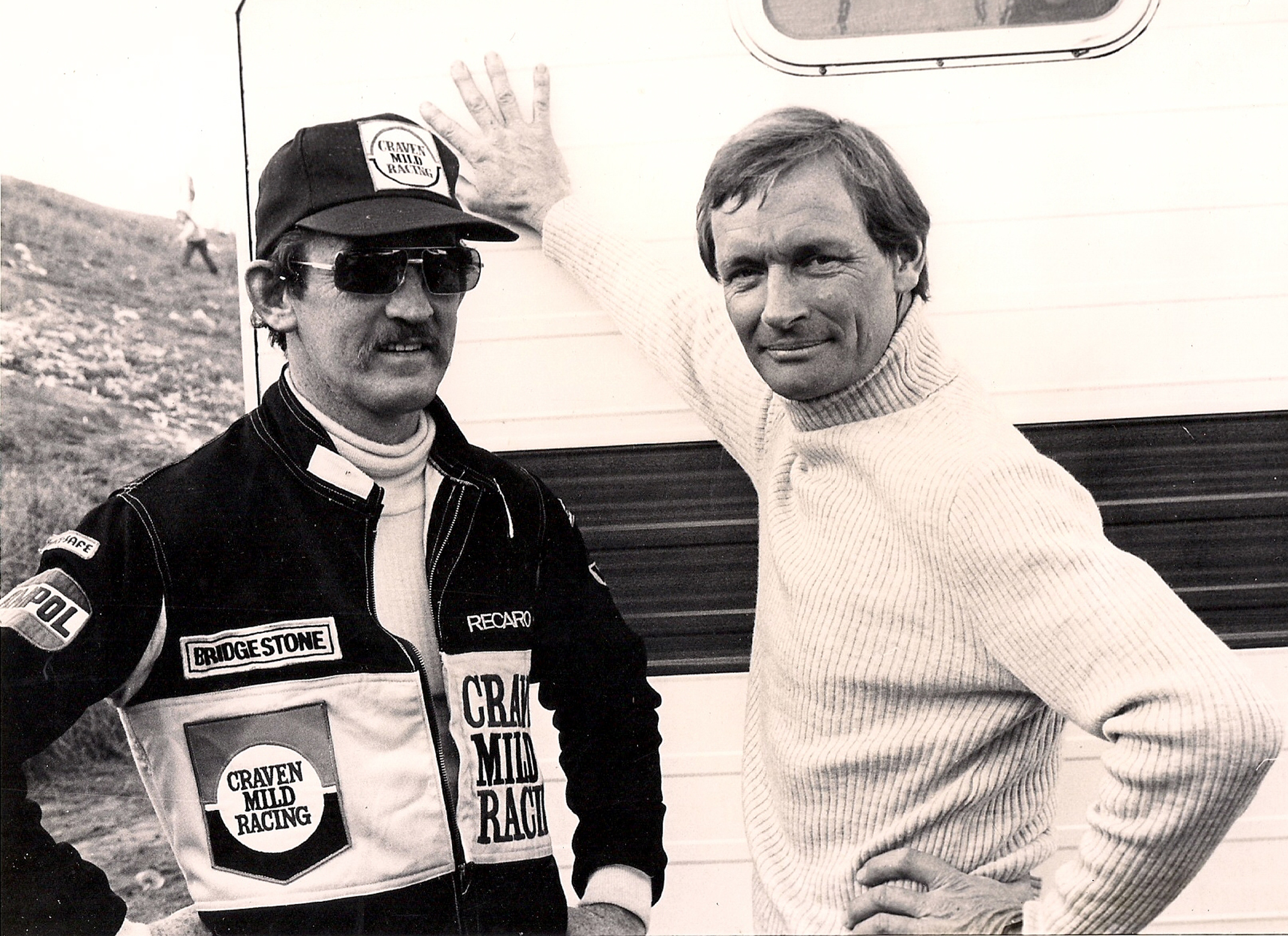
The championship was won by Allan Grice (left)

The 1979 Australian Sports Sedan Championship was a CAMS sanctioned Australian motor racing title for drivers of Group B Sports Sedans. It was the fourth Australian Sports Sedan Championship.

The championship was won by Allan Grice driving a Chevrolet Corvair.

== Calendar ==
The championship was contested over a nine round series.

| Round | Name | Circuit | State | Date | Format | Round winner | Car |
| 1 | | Lakeside | Queensland | 1 April | Two heats | Jim Richards | Ford XC Falcon |
| 2 | | Oran Park | New South Wales | 29 April | One race | Allan Grice | Chevrolet Corvair |
| 3 | The Advertiser Sports Sedan Challenge | Adelaide International Raceway | South Australia | 3 June | One race | Tony Edmondson | Alfa Romeo Alfetta GTV Repco Holden |
| 4 | | Wanneroo Park | Western Australia | 10 June | Two heats | Allan Grice | Chevrolet Corvair |
| 5 | | Calder | Victoria | 8 August | Two heats | Tony Edmondson | Alfa Romeo Alfetta GTV Repco Holden |
| 6 | | Surfers Paradise | Queensland | 26 August | Two heats | Phil Ward | Holden HQ Monaro |
| 7 | | Symmons Plains | Tasmania | 16 September | Two heats | Allan Grice | Chevrolet Corvair |
| 8 | | Baskerville | Tasmania | 7 October | Two heats | John Briggs | Chevrolet Monza |
| 9 | | Sandown Park | Victoria | 9 December | Two heats | Ron Harrop | Ford TD Cortina |

== Points system ==
Championship points were awarded on a 9–6–4–3–2–1 basis to the first six placegetters at each round. Only the best eight round results could be retained by each driver.

For rounds staged over two heats, points were allocated on a 20–16–13–11–10–9–8–7–6–5–4–3–2–1 basis to the first 14 finishers in each heat. These points were aggregated to determine the first six placegetters for the round. In the event of two or more drivers attaining the same total, the relevant round placing was awarded to the driver who place higher in the final heat.

== Points table ==
| Position | Driver | Car | Entrant | Lak | Ora | Ade | Wan | Cal | Sur | Sym | Bas | San | Total |
|---|---|---|---|---|---|---|---|---|---|---|---|---|---|
| 1 | Allan Grice | Chevrolet Corvair | Craven Mild Racing | 6 | 9 | 6 | 9 | 3 | 4 | 6 | 9 | – | 52 |
| 2 | Tony Edmondson | Alfa Romeo Alfetta GTV Repco Holden | Donald Elliott | 4 | 2 | 9 | 6 | 9 | 6 | – | – | – | 36 |
| 3 | Jim Richards | Ford XC Falcon; Chrysler VH Valiant Charger; Chevrolet Monza | Jim Richards Motor Racing; Clem Smith; Rotax Monza | 9 | 6 | 3 | – | – | – | 3 | – | 2 | 23 |
| 4 | Phil Ward | Holden HQ Monaro | Channel 10 – NSW Building Society | – | 4 | – | – | 6 | 9 | – | – | – | 19 |
| 5 | John Briggs | Chevrolet Monza | Computa Car | – | – | 4 | – | – | – | 9 | – | – | 13 |
| 6 | Ron Harrop | Ford TD Cortina | Pat Crea | – | – | – | – | – | – | – | – | 9 | 9 |
| 7 | Darryl Wilcox | Holden Torana | | – | – | – | – | – | – | – | 6 | – | 6 |
| 7 | Les Swallow | Chevrolet Corvair | Les Swallow | – | – | – | – | – | – | – | – | 6 | 6 |
| 7 | Allan Moffat | Chevrolet Monza | Allan Moffat Racing | – | 3 | – | – | – | – | – | – | 3 | 6 |
| 10 | Gordon Mitchell | Morris Marina Rover | Go-Gear | – | – | – | 4 | – | – | – | – | – | 4 |
| 10 | Ken Hastings | Volkswagen Karmann Ghia | Ken Hastings | – | – | – | – | 4 | – | – | – | – | 4 |
| 10 | John Pollard | Chevrolet Monza | Gary & Warren Smith | – | – | – | – | – | – | 4 | – | – | 4 |
| 10 | Martin Sinclair | Holden Torana | | – | – | – | – | – | – | – | 4 | – | 4 |
| 10 | Ron King | Holden Torana | Ron King | – | – | – | – | – | – | – | – | 4 | 4 |
| 15 | Stephen Land | Holden Torana | Stephen Land | 3 | – | – | – | – | – | – | – | – | 3 |
| 15 | Brian Rhodes | Holden Torana GTR XU-1 | Brian Rhodes | – | – | – | 3 | – | – | – | – | – | 3 |
| 15 | John Tesoriero | Volvo 142 | | – | – | – | – | 1 | 2 | – | – | – | 3 |
| 15 | John White | Holden Monaro | | – | – | – | – | – | 3 | – | – | – | 3 |
| 15 | Bruce Gowans | Toyota Celica | Ling Gowans Toyota | – | – | – | – | – | – | 2 | 1 | – | 3 |
| 15 | Paul Minehan | Holden Torana | | – | – | – | – | – | – | – | 3 | – | 3 |
| 21 | Fred Sayers | Morris Clubman | | 2 | – | – | – | – | – | – | – | – | 2 |
| 21 | Pat Crea | Ford TD Cortina | Pat Crea | – | – | 2 | – | – | – | – | – | – | 2 |
| 21 | Graeme Hooley | Holden Torana A9X | Graeme Hooley | – | – | – | 2 | – | – | – | – | – | 2 |
| 21 | Brian Potts | Holden Torana | | – | – | – | – | 2 | – | – | – | – | 2 |
| 21 | Rob Davies | Ford Escort | | – | – | – | – | – | – | – | 2 | – | 2 |
| 26 | Doug Clark | Toyota Celica | | 1 | – | – | – | – | – | – | – | – | 1 |
| 26 | Bob Stevens | Ford Mustang | | – | 1 | – | – | – | – | – | – | – | 1 |
| 26 | Luigi De Luca | Ford Anglia | Dowidat Belzer Tools | – | – | 1 | – | – | – | – | – | – | 1 |
| 26 | Kevin Mann | Leyland Mini | Kevin Mann | – | – | – | 1 | – | – | – | – | – | 1 |
| 26 | Peter Phillips | Ford Escort | | – | – | – | – | – | 1 | – | – | – | 1 |
| 26 | Rod Stevens | Ford Falcon | Brian Wood Ford | – | – | – | – | – | – | – | – | 1 | 1 |
