= 1978 Australian Sports Sedan Championship =

Motor racing competition

The 1978 Australian Sports Sedan Championship was an Australian motor racing competition organised by the Confederation of Australian Motor Sport for Group B Sports Sedans. It was the third Australian Sports Sedan Championship title to be awarded by CAMS.

The championship was won by Allan Grice driving a Chevrolet Corvair for Craven Mild Racing.

== Calendar ==
The championship was contested over a seven round series.

Round	Name	Circuit	State	Date	Format	Winning driver	Car
1		Surfers Paradise International Raceway	Queensland	21 May	Two heats	Allan Grice	Chevrolet Corvair
2	The Advertiser Trophy	Adelaide International Raceway	South Australia	11 June	Two heats	Jim Richards	Ford XC Falcon Hardtop
3		Wanneroo Park	Western Australia	18 June	Two heats	Jim Richards	Ford XC Falcon Hardtop
4		Sandown Park	Victoria	2 July	Two heats	Allan Grice	Chevrolet Corvair
5		Lakeside	Queensland	17 July	Two heats	Allan Grice	Chevrolet Corvair
6		Calder	Victoria	6 August	One race	Jim Richards	Ford XC Falcon Hardtop
7		Symmons Plains	Tasmania	17 September	Two heats	Allan Grice	Chevrolet Corvair

== Points system ==
Championship points were awarded on a 9-6-4-3-2-1 basis for the first six places at each round. Points from the six best round results could be retained by each driver.

Where a round was contested over more than one heat, round points were awarded on a 20-16-13-11-10-9-8-7-6-5-4-3-2-1 basis to the first 14 placegetters in each heat. These points were then aggregated to determine the placings for the round. Where more than one driver attained the same total, the relevant round placing was awarded to the driver with the highest placing in the last heat.

== Results ==
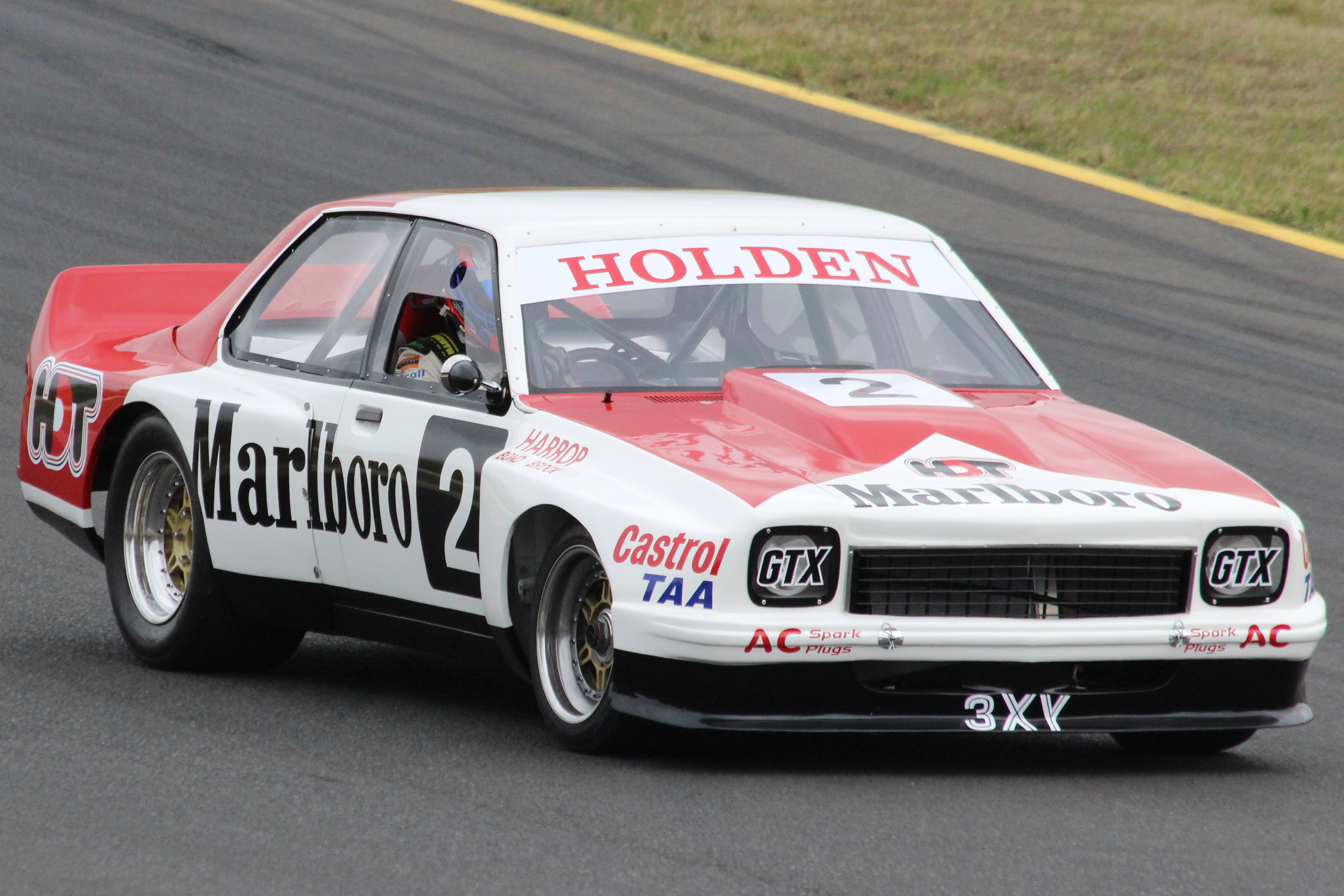
Ron Harrop placed fourth in this Holden LH Torana entered by the Marlboro Holden Dealer Team. (The car is pictured in 2015 in its 1978 livery)

Position	Driver	No.	Car	Entrant	R1	R2	R3	R4	R5	R6	R7	Total
1	Allan Grice	6	Chevrolet Corvair	Craven Mild Racing	9	-	6	9	9	3	9	45
2	Jim Richards	12	Ford XC Falcon Hardtop	Jim Richards Motor Racing	6	9	9	6	6	9	(3)	45 (48)
3	Bruce Gowans	11	Toyota Celica-Repco Holden	Ling Gowans Toyota	-	-	3	4	4	-	6	17
4	Ron Harrop	2	Holden LH Torana	Marlboro Holden Dealer Team	-	6	4	3	-	-	-	13
5	John Mann	49	Ford Cortina		-	-	-	-	-	6	2	8
6	Phil Lucas	3	Volvo	Wrigleys	-	2	2	-	-	-	4	8
7	Tony Edmondson	9	Chrysler VK Charger-Repco Holden	Donald Elliott	3	4	-	-	-	-	-	7
8	Pat Crea	300	Ford Cortina	Pat Crea	1	3	-	-	2	-	-	6
9	Garry Rogers	34 & 3	Holden HQ Monaro	Greater Pacific Finance	4	-	-	1	-	-	-	5
10	Clem Smith	15	Chrysler VH Valiant Charger	Clem Smith	-	-	-	-	-	4	-	4
11	Geoff Russell	35	Holden LJ Torana		-	-	-	-	3	-	-	3
12	Phil Ward	32	Ford Escort Mark 1	Wrigleys 2UW Racing Team	2	-	-	-	-	-	-	2
12	Murray Carter	18	Ford Falcon		-	-	-	2	-	-	-	2
12	Neil West	97	Hillman Imp		-	-	-	-	-	2	-	2
15	David Jarrett	14	Chevrolet Camaro	Shell Sport	-	1	-	-	-	-	-	1
15	Ian Diffen	98	Holden Torana		-	-	1	-	-	-	-	1
15	Steve Land	47	Holden Torana		-	-	-	-	1	-	-	1
15	Andy McIntyre	66	Morris Cooper		-	-	-	-	-	1	-	1
15	Ken Hastings	57	Volkswagen Karmann Ghia		-	-	-	-	-	-	1	1
