= Chevrolet small-block engine =

The Chevrolet small-block engine refers to one of the several gasoline-powered vehicle engines manufactured by General Motors. These include:

- The first or second generation of non-LS Chevrolet small-block engines
- The third, fourth, or LS-based GM engines
- The Chevrolet Gemini small-block engine

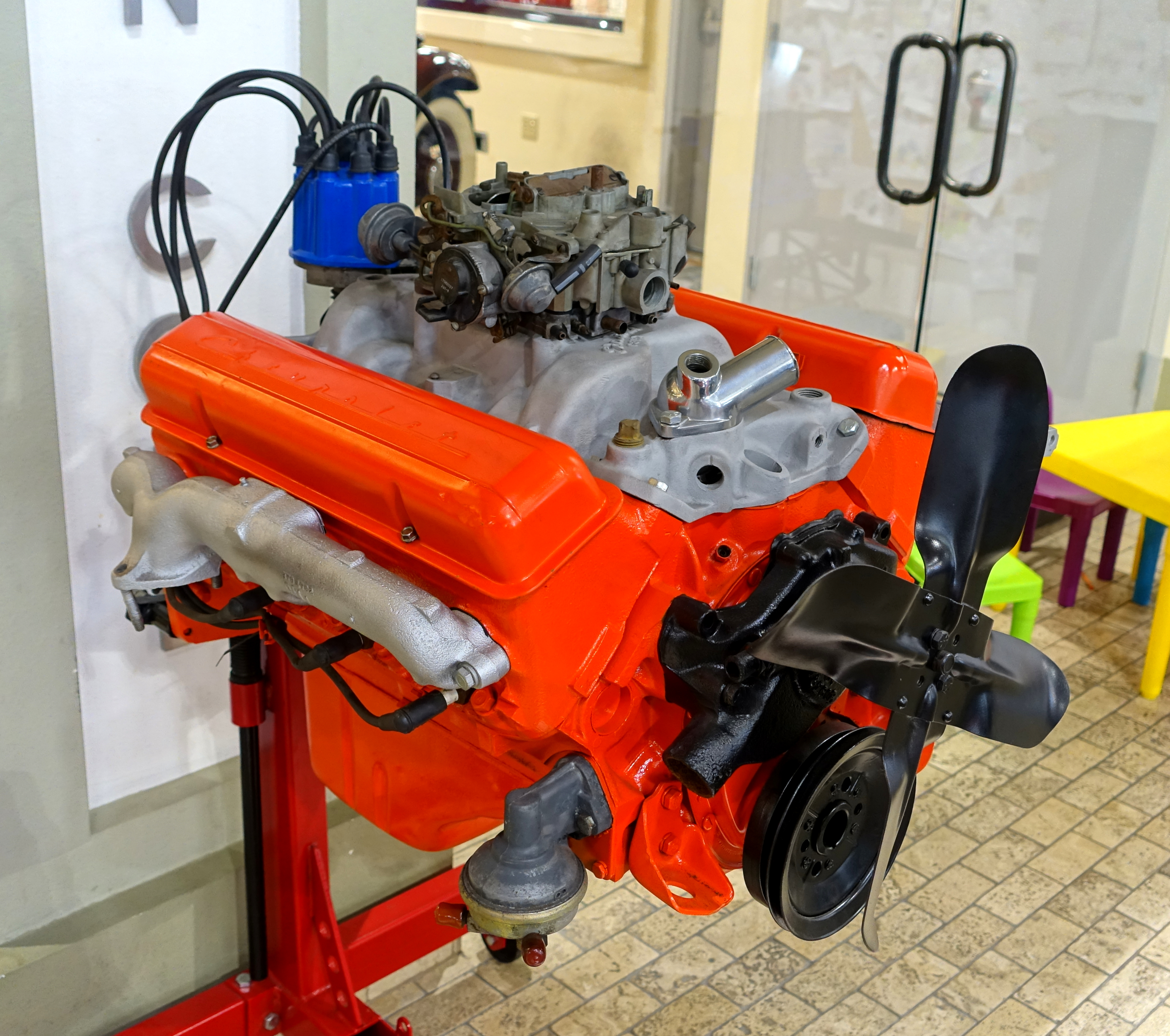
An early model of the Chevrolet small-block engine
