= Suzuki X-90 =

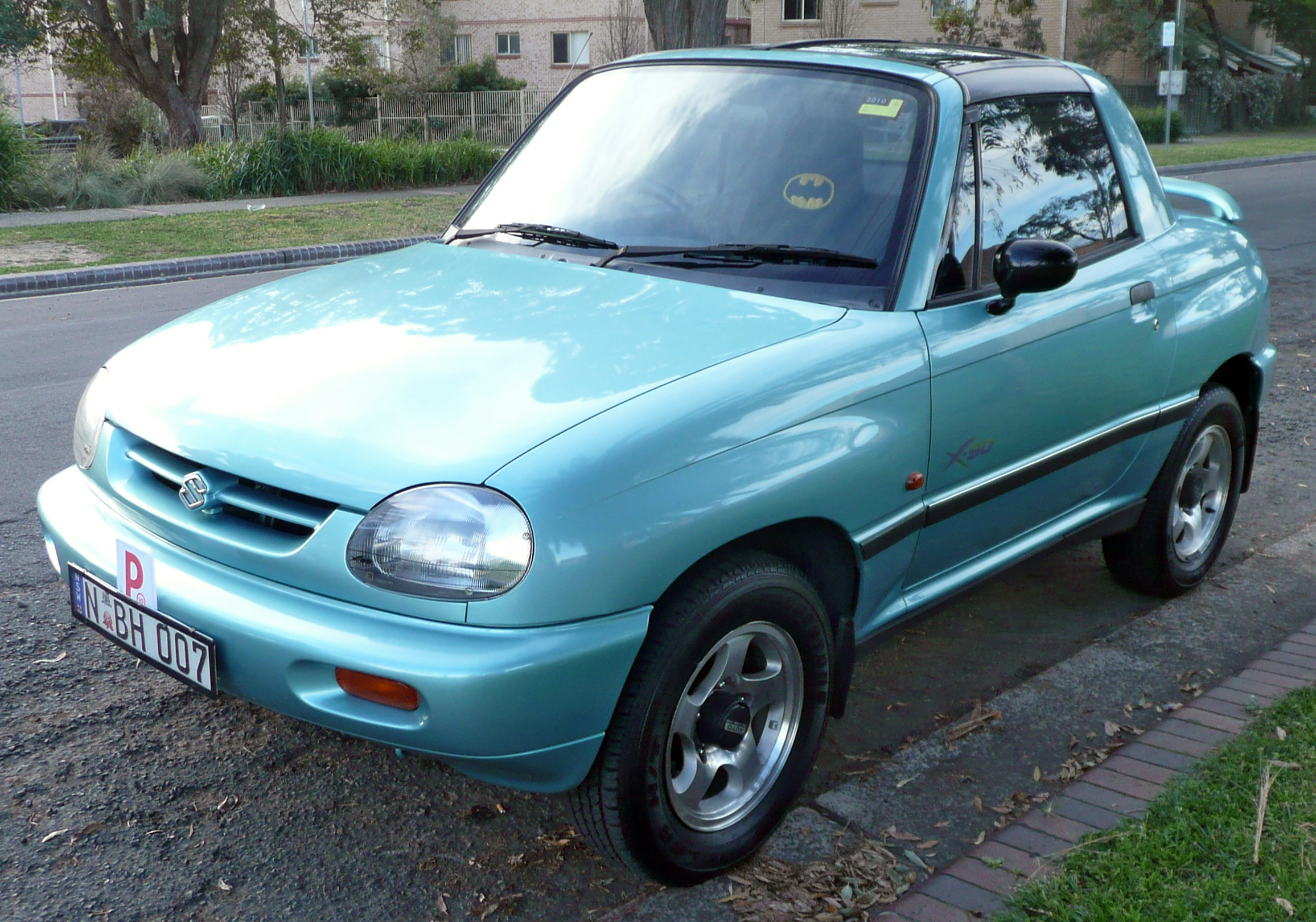

Overview
- Manufacturer: Suzuki
- Also called: Suzuki Vitara X-90 (Europe)
- Production: 1995–1997
- Assembly: Japan: Iwata, Shizuoka

Body and chassis
- Class: Subcompact car
- Body style: 2-door coupe
- Layout: Front-engine, rear-wheel-drive; Front-engine, four-wheel-drive
- Chassis: Body-on-frame
- Related: Suzuki Vitara

Powertrain
- Engine: 1.6 L SOHC G16A
- Transmission: 4-speed automatic; 5-speed manual

Dimensions
- Wheelbase: 2,200 mm (86.6 in)
- Length: 3,710 mm (146.1 in)
- Width: 1,695 mm (66.7 in)
- Height: 1,550 mm (61.0 in)
- Curb weight: 1,100 kg (2,425 lb)

Chronology
- Predecessor: Suzuki Samurai (United States)

The Suzuki X-90 is a rear- or four-wheel drive, two-door, two-seater offroad automobile incorporating sports car elements, manufactured and marketed by Suzuki between 1995 and 1997. Derived from the Suzuki Vitara, the X-90 featured a T-top removable roof. Replacing the Samurai in the United States market. Suzuki began marketing the X-90 in Japan toward the end of 1995, and in western markets in April 1996.

== Overview ==
The X-90 debuted as a concept car at the 1993 Tokyo Motor Show. Suzuki presented the production vehicle in 1995, and began marketing the X-90 by the end of that year in Japan, with international markets the following year. 1,348 were sold in Japan, and 7,205 X-90s were imported into the United States. Nearly two thirds of the examples delivered in the United States were sold in 1996, with sales of 2,087 the next year, and 477 in 1998.

During 1996, 484 vehicles were imported into Australia. The X-90 was also imported into Europe. By the middle of 1997, the retail pricing had dropped by a quarter. No further imports occurred, and the last of the vehicles sold in 1999. The X-90 was the base vehicle for Red Bull's advertising vehicles, which featured a 1.5 m (5') mockup of the company's product can mounted over the trunk.

In October 2013, Top Gear Magazine placed the X-90 on its list of The 13 Worst Cars of the Last 20 Years. In March 2022, Motor Trend named the X-90 #1 on its list of the 25 worst cars of the 1990s.

Philippe Cousteau Special Edition

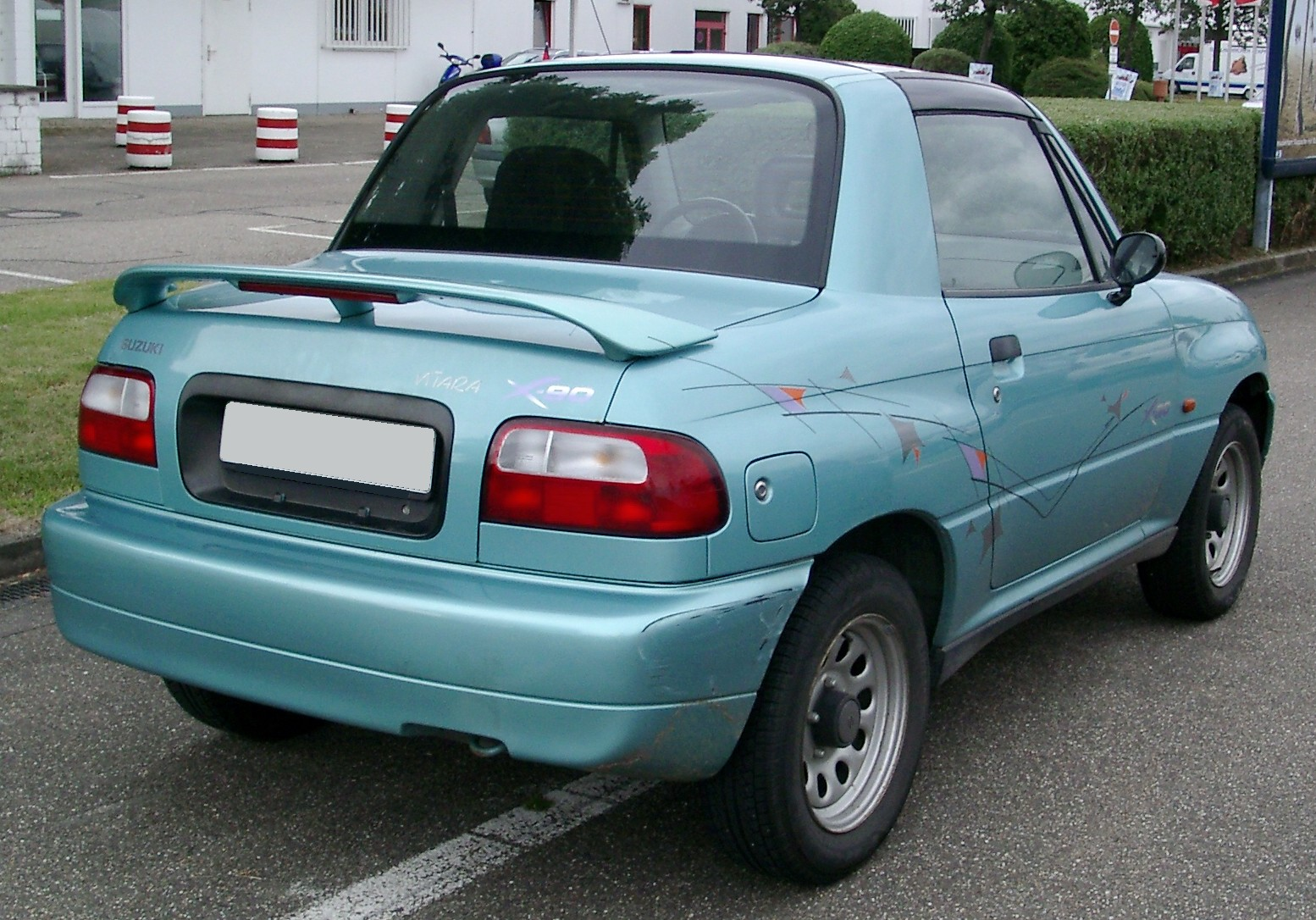
Rear view of a European Market Vitara X-90

Towards the end of the X-90's production run some X-90s in Europe were sold as the Suzuki Vitara X-90 Philippe Cousteau Special Edition. These featured a moulded bodykit that included a bullbar, running boards, wheel arch extensions all finished in the body colour as well as special 16 inch wheels and decals that numbered the vehicle out of 3000. The special edition was named after the French cinematographer Philippe Cousteau, despite his death occurring more than 15 years before the first X-90 was produced.

== Specifications ==
The X-90 used a 1.6 litre 16 valve inline-four engine which produced 95 PS (70 kW) and was available with four-wheel drive or rear-wheel drive, and either a five-speed manual or an automatic transmission. The X-90 featured dual air bags, anti lock brakes, optional air conditioning, and offered a dealer-installed, six-disc CD changer.

The suspension used MacPherson struts and coil springs in front and coil springs with wishbone and trailing links in the rear. A space saver spare wheel is stored in the trunk, and space behind the two seats offers further cargo area.
