= Nissan 300ZX =

Sports car produced by Nissan

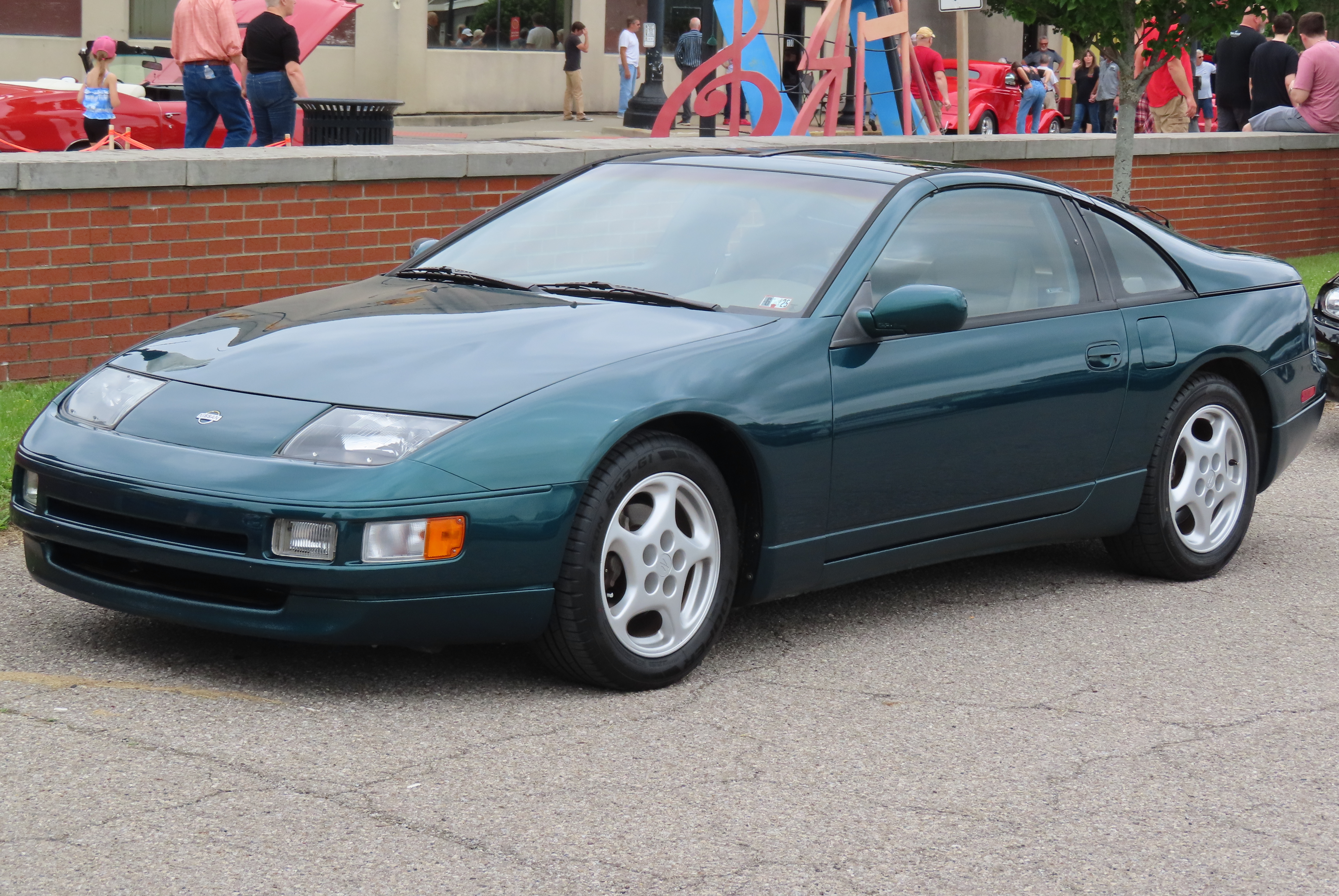
- 1996 Nissan 300ZX t-top (Z32)

Overview
- Manufacturer: Nissan
- Also called: Nissan Fairlady Z
- Production: 1983–2000
- Assembly: Japan: Hiratsuka, Kanagawa (Nissan Shatai); South Africa: Rosslyn (1992–1994, Nissan South Africa)

Body and chassis
- Class: Grand Tourer / Sports car
- Layout: Front-engine, rear-wheel-drive

Chronology
- Predecessor: Nissan Fairlady Z (S130)
- Successor: Nissan 350Z

The Nissan 300ZX is a sports car that was produced across two different generations. As with all other versions of the Z, the 300ZX was sold within the Japanese domestic market under the name Fairlady Z.

It was sold in Japan from 1983 to 2000 and in the United States from 1984 to 1996, the 300ZX name followed the numerical convention initiated with the original Z car, the Nissan Fairlady Z (S30), which was marketed in the U.S. as the 240Z. The addition of the "X" to the car's name was a carryover from its predecessor, the 280ZX, to signify the presence of more luxury and comfort oriented features. The first generation 300ZX known as the Z31 model was produced from 1983 through 1989 and was a sales success becoming the highest volume Z-car for Nissan.

To become even more competitive in the sports car market, the second generation 300ZX was driven up-market. It was redesigned to be faster and to feature more advanced technology, but came with a higher price than its predecessor, with consecutive price increases each model year of availability. As such, sales dwindled each year, a trend in the higher end sports car market at the time, and Nissan placed a hiatus on selling new Nissan Z-Cars to the US after the 1996 model year, though the car would continue to be sold in the Japan domestic market until 2001 in low production numbers.

Car and Driver placed the Z32 on its Ten Best list for seven consecutive years, each model year of its availability in the United States. Motor Trend awarded it as the 1990 Import Car of the Year. The Nissan 350Z, officially the Z33 generation Z-Car, succeeded the 300ZX in 2003.

== Z31 ==
Z31
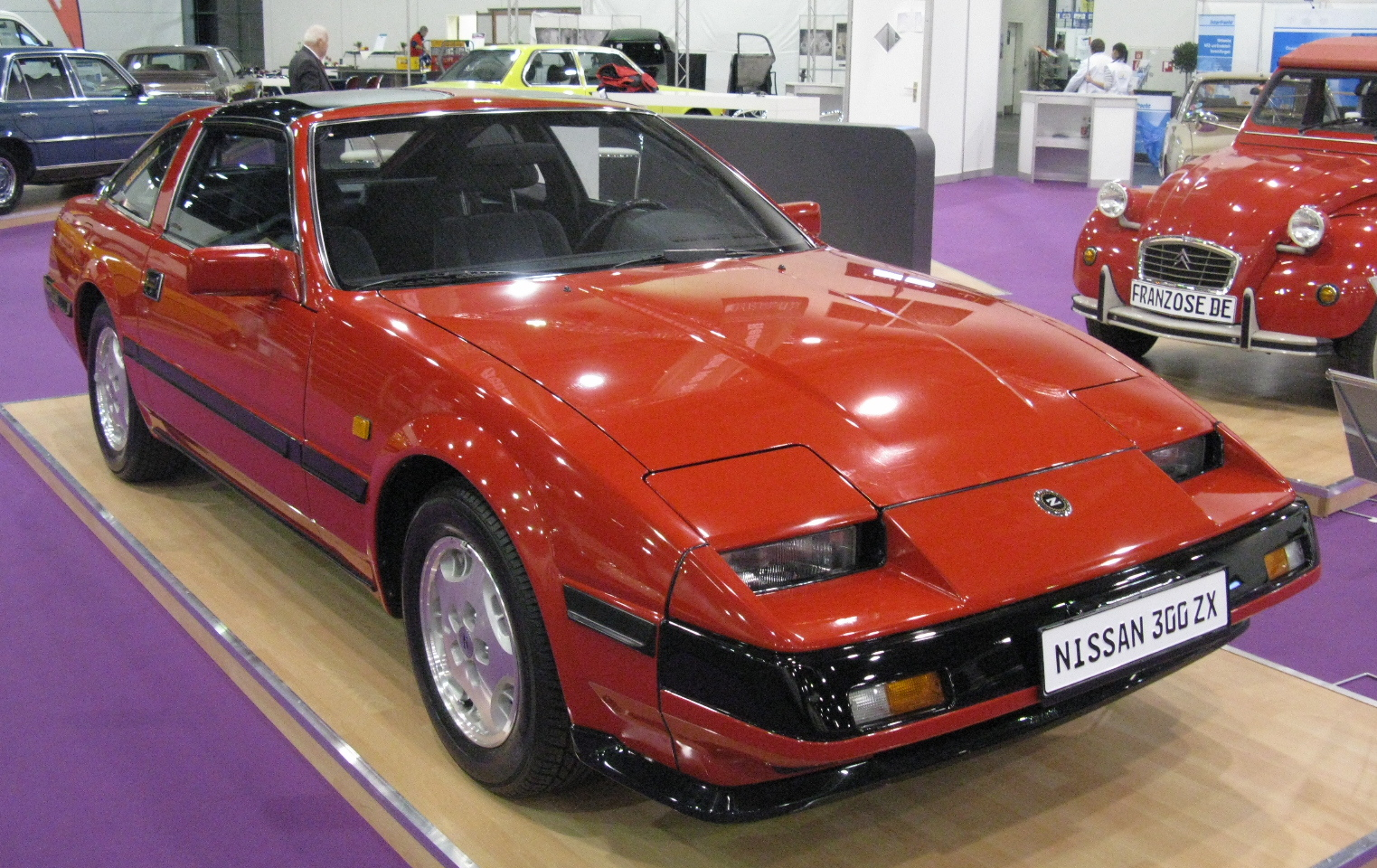
- 1984–85 300ZX, with T-tops

Overview
- Also called: Nissan Fairlady Z
- Production: July 1983–1989; number produced: 329,900; (export: 294,516); (domestic: 35,384)
- Model years: 1984–1989
- Designer: Kazumasu Takagi (1982)

Body and chassis
- Body style: 3-door 2-seater coupé or T-top; 3-door 2+2 coupé or T-top

Powertrain
- Engine: 2.0 L VG20ET turbo V6 (200Z/ZG/ZS); 2.0 L RB20DET turbo DOHC I6 (200ZR); 3.0 L VG30E V6 (300ZX); 3.0 L VG30ET turbo V6 (300ZX Turbo); 3.0 L VG30DE DOHC V6 (300ZR)
- Transmission: 5-speed FS5W71C manual; 5-speed FS5R90A manual; 5-speed FS5R30A manual; 4-speed Jatco E4N71B automatic

Dimensions
- Wheelbase: 2,320 mm (91.3 in) (SWB); 2,520 mm (99.2 in) (LWB)
- Length: 4,410 mm (173.6 in) (SWB); 4,605 mm (181.3 in) (LWB)
- Width: 1,725 mm (67.9 in)
- Height: 1,260 mm (49.6 in)
- Curb weight: 2,888–3,280 lb (1,310–1,488 kg)

Chronology
- Predecessor: Nissan 280ZX
- Successor: Nissan 300ZX (Z32)

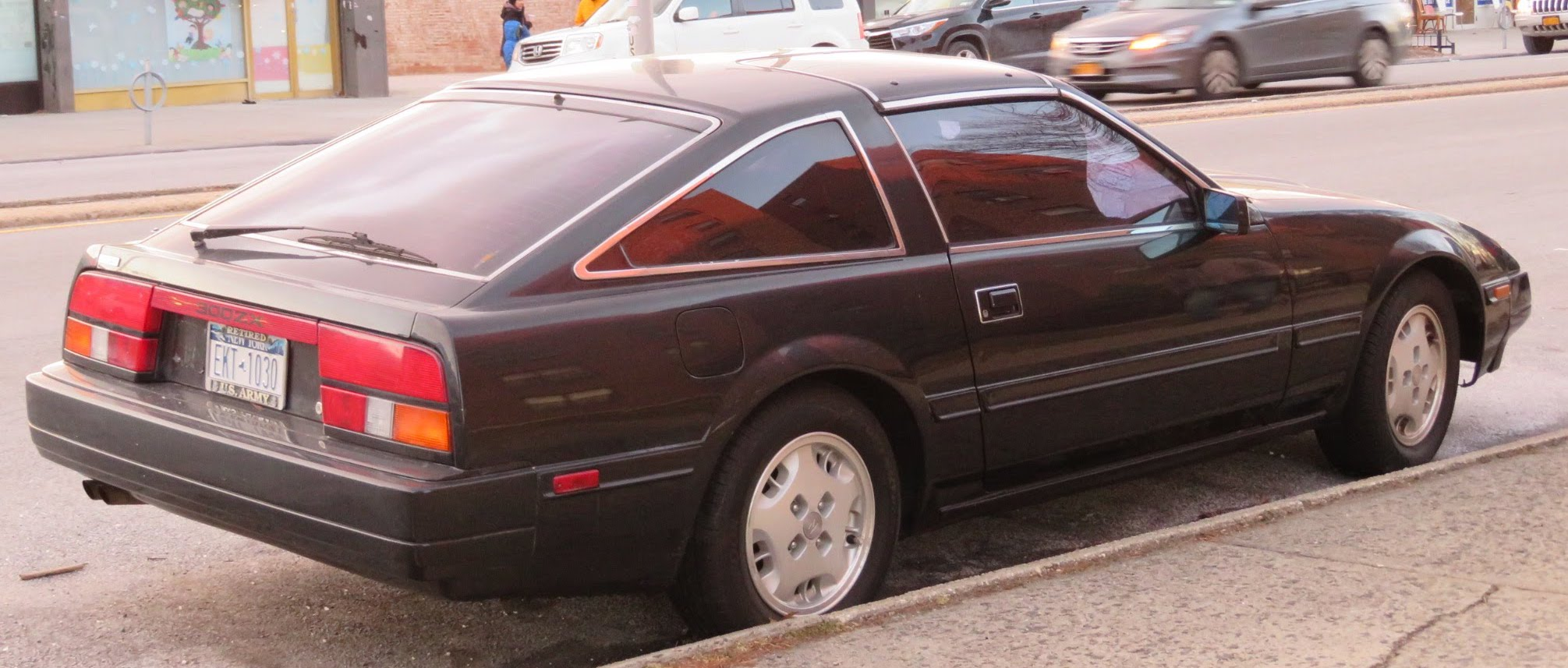
1984–85, rear

The Z31 chassis designation was first introduced in Japan on September 16, 1983, as the Fairlady Z. Designed by Kazumasu Takagi and his team of developers, the Z31 improved aerodynamics and increased power when compared to its predecessor, the 280ZX. The newer Z-car had a drag coefficient of 0.30 and many were powered by Japan's first mass-produced V6 engine instead of the inline-sixes of the previous Z-cars. According to Nissan, the new V6 engine was intended to uphold the sporty, six-cylinder spirit of the original Fairlady Z, but in a more compact and efficient package.

=== Mechanical ===
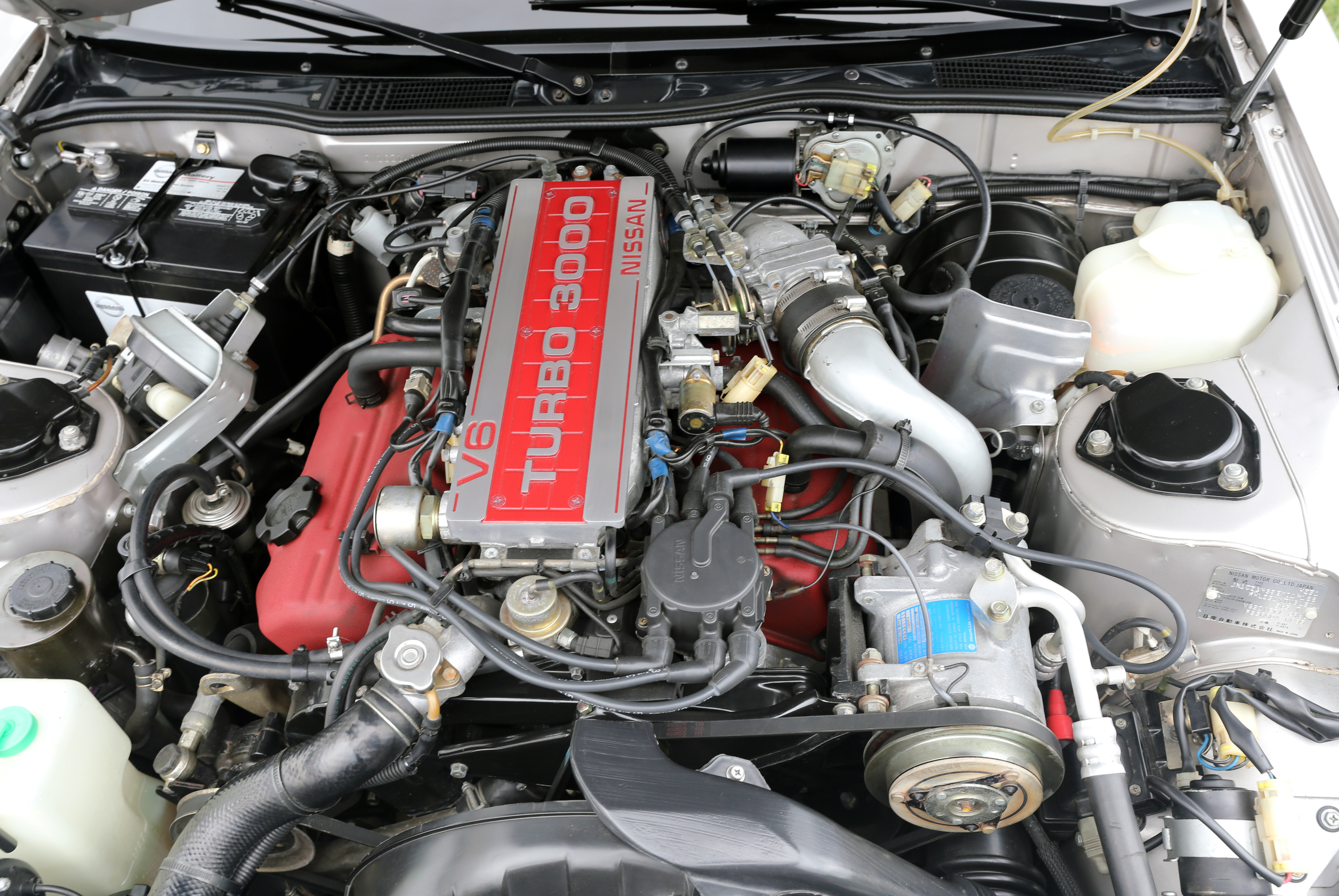
VG30ET V6 Turbo

All Z31s were equipped with engines that had electronic fuel injection (EFI), and all cars were rear wheel drive. There were five engine options in total: A turbocharged dual overhead cam 2.0 L straight-six (RB20DET (NICS), used in the 200ZR), a turbocharged single overhead cam 2.0 L V6 (VG20ET, found in the Japanese domestic market 200Z/ZS/ZG), a naturally aspirated single overhead cam 3.0 L V6 (VG30E, found in 300ZX), a turbocharged single overhead cam 3.0 L V6 (VG30ET, used in 300ZX Turbo) and a naturally aspirated dual overhead cam 3.0 L V6 (VG30DE, used in 300ZR).

Many of the Z31s were equipped with the new VG family of V6 engines, which was Japan's first 60-degree V6, unlike its predecessors, which used L-series I6 engines. The VG engines were found in the 200Z/ZS/ZG, 300ZX and 300ZR trims, from 2.0L to 3.0L. The VG30 engine was either a type A or type B sub-designation from 1984 to March 1987, while models from April 1987 to 1989 had a W sub-designation. The W-series engines featured redesigned water jackets for additional cooling, and fully floating piston wrist pins. Finally, these engines were equipped with self-adjusting hydraulic valve lifters.

Some Z31s are equipped with the turbocharged RB20DET engine, which are the last Z-cars to use a inline-six cylinder engine; these were sold as the Fairlady Z 200ZR, of which roughly 8,283 were produced between 1985 and 1988. 200ZR's came in two trims; 200ZR-I (base model with the 'slicktop roof,' crank windows, A/C, base model creature comforts, and only with a manual transmission), and 200ZR-II (t-top roof, more electronic options, and available with an optional automatic transmission). 200ZR models also came standard with the R200 limited-slip differential, white faced gauges, and ZR specific cloth upholstery.

Z31 engines
Model	Engine	Displ.	Config.	Power	Torque	Market
200Z /ZS /ZG	VG20ET	1,998 cc (122 cu in)	V6, OHC with turbo	170 PS JIS gross (125 kW; 168 hp) at 6000 rpm	216 N⋅m (159 lb⋅ft) at 3600 rpm	JDM
200ZR	RB20DET	1,998 cc (122 cu in)	I6, DOHC with turbo	180 PS JIS net (132 kW; 178 hp) at 6400 rpm	226 N⋅m (166 lb⋅ft) at 3600 rpm	JDM
300ZX	VG30E	2,960 cc (181 cu in)	V6, OHC	160 hp SAE net (119 kW; 162 PS) at 5200 rpm	235 N⋅m (173 lb⋅ft) at 4000 rpm	US, 1984-87
300ZX	VG30E	2,960 cc (181 cu in)	V6, OHC	165 hp SAE net (123 kW; 167 PS) at 5200 rpm	236 N⋅m (174 lb⋅ft) at 4000 rpm	US, 1988-89
300ZR	VG30DE	2,960 cc (181 cu in)	V6, DOHC	190 PS JIS net (140 kW; 187 hp) at 6000 rpm	245 N⋅m (181 lb⋅ft) at 4400 rpm	JDM
300ZX	VG30DE	2,960 cc (181 cu in)	V6, DOHC	170 PS DIN (125 kW; 168 hp) at 5600 rpm	235 N⋅m (173 lb⋅ft) at 4400 rpm	Global
300ZX	VG30DE	2,960 cc (181 cu in)	V6, DOHC	182 PS SAE gross (134 kW; 180 hp) at 5600 rpm	257 N⋅m (190 lb⋅ft) at 4400 rpm	Saudi Arabia
300ZX Turbo	VG30ET	2,960 cc (181 cu in)	V6, OHC with turbo	230 PS JIS Gross (169 kW; 227 hp) at 5200 rpm 195 PS JIS Net (143 kW; 192 hp) at 5200 rpm	333 N⋅m (246 lb⋅ft) at 3600 rpm 309 N⋅m (228 lb⋅ft) at 3600 rpm	JDM, 1983-86; JDM, 1986-88
300ZX Turbo	VG30ET	2,960 cc (181 cu in)	V6, OHC with turbo	200 hp SAE net (149 kW; 203 PS) at 5200 rpm	308 N⋅m (227 lb⋅ft) at 3600 rpm	US, 1984-87
300ZX Turbo	VG30ET	2,960 cc (181 cu in)	V6, OHC with turbo	205 hp SAE net (153 kW; 208 PS) at 5200 rpm	308 N⋅m (227 lb⋅ft) at 3600 rpm	US, 1988-89
300ZX Turbo	VG30ET	2,960 cc (181 cu in)	V6, OHC with turbo	228 PS DIN (168 kW; 225 hp) at 5400 rpm	326 N⋅m (240 lb⋅ft) at 4400 rpm	Global

The Z31s are equipped with a 5-speed manual or an optional 4-speed automatic transmission; all Z31 automatics were the E4N71B equipped with torque-converter lockup, including turbo models. All Z31s were equipped with a Nissan R200 rear differential. April 1987 and later turbo models received a modified R200 featuring a clutch-based limited-slip differential, except 1988 Shiro Specials which had a viscous-type limited-slip differential.

=== Technology ===
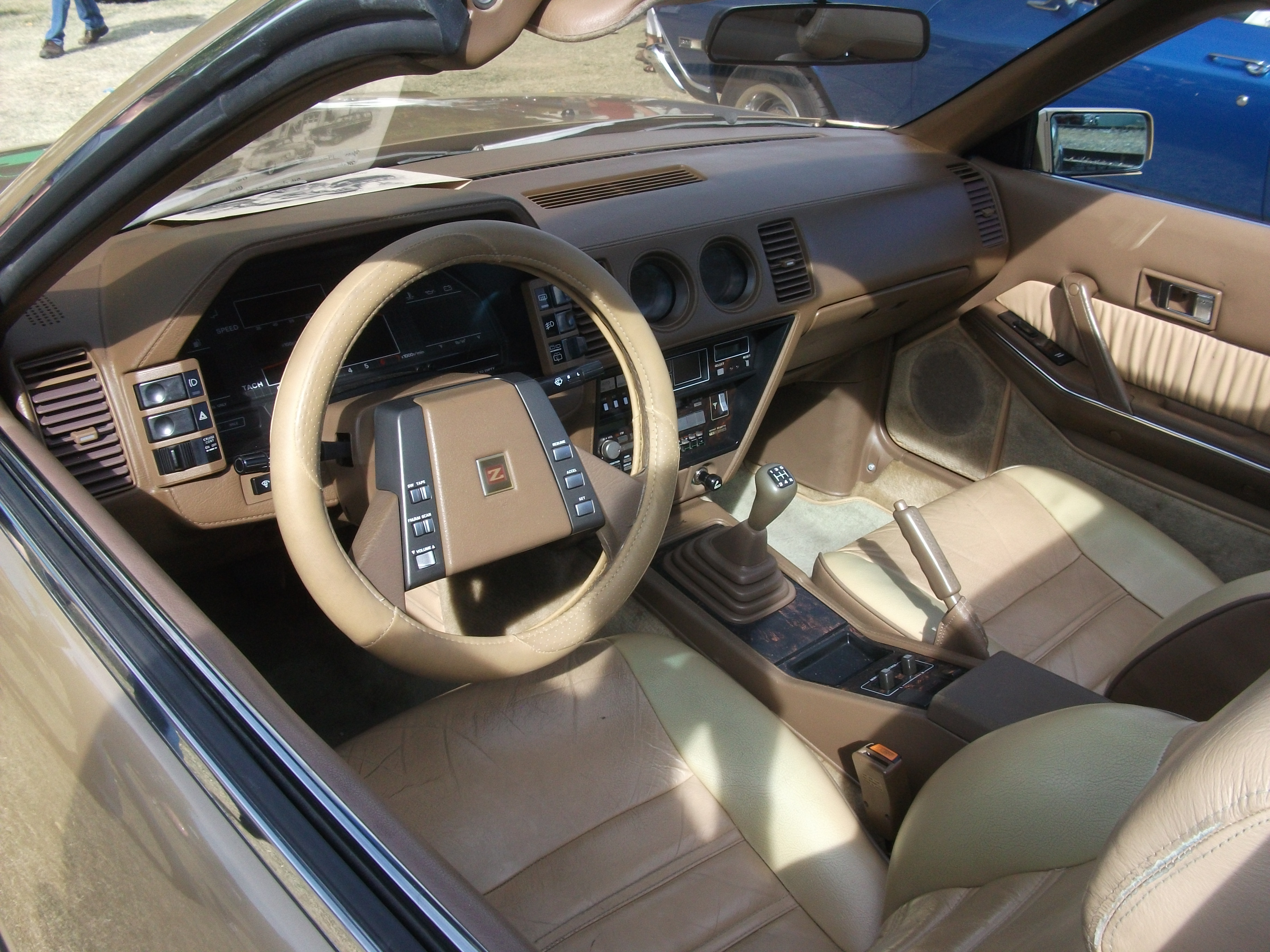
Interior with digital instruments (MY 1985)

As with some other Nissan models of the period, the new Z31s were equipped with a "Voice Warning System". The Voice Warning System used a pre-recorded voice box, the vehicle's radio and driver's door speaker to mute the radio and provide a vocal warning whenever the left or right door was ajar, the exterior lights were left on after the vehicle was turned off, parking brake was left on while trying to operate the car, or the fuel level was low. This system was dropped for the 1987 model year.

Other technological features in the 300ZX included a "Body Sonic" audio system (which utilized a separate amplifier and speakers in the vehicle's front seats that allowed bass from music to be felt by the vehicle's occupants), analog gauges, stereo and climate control, or an optional digital gauge cluster, digital stereo with equalizer and an optional fully digital climate control system.

=== Chassis ===
The Z31 chassis was based on the 280ZX. Although the newer chassis had the same wheelbase and MacPherson strut/semi-trailing arm independent suspension design, it handled and accelerated better than the 280ZX it replaced. Turbocharged models, except for the Shiro Special edition, lower trim 200Z models, and the 200ZR-I, had 3-way electronically adjustable shock absorbers. The Z31 was available in either left or right hand drive.

=== Style and evolution ===
1986 and 1987 updates

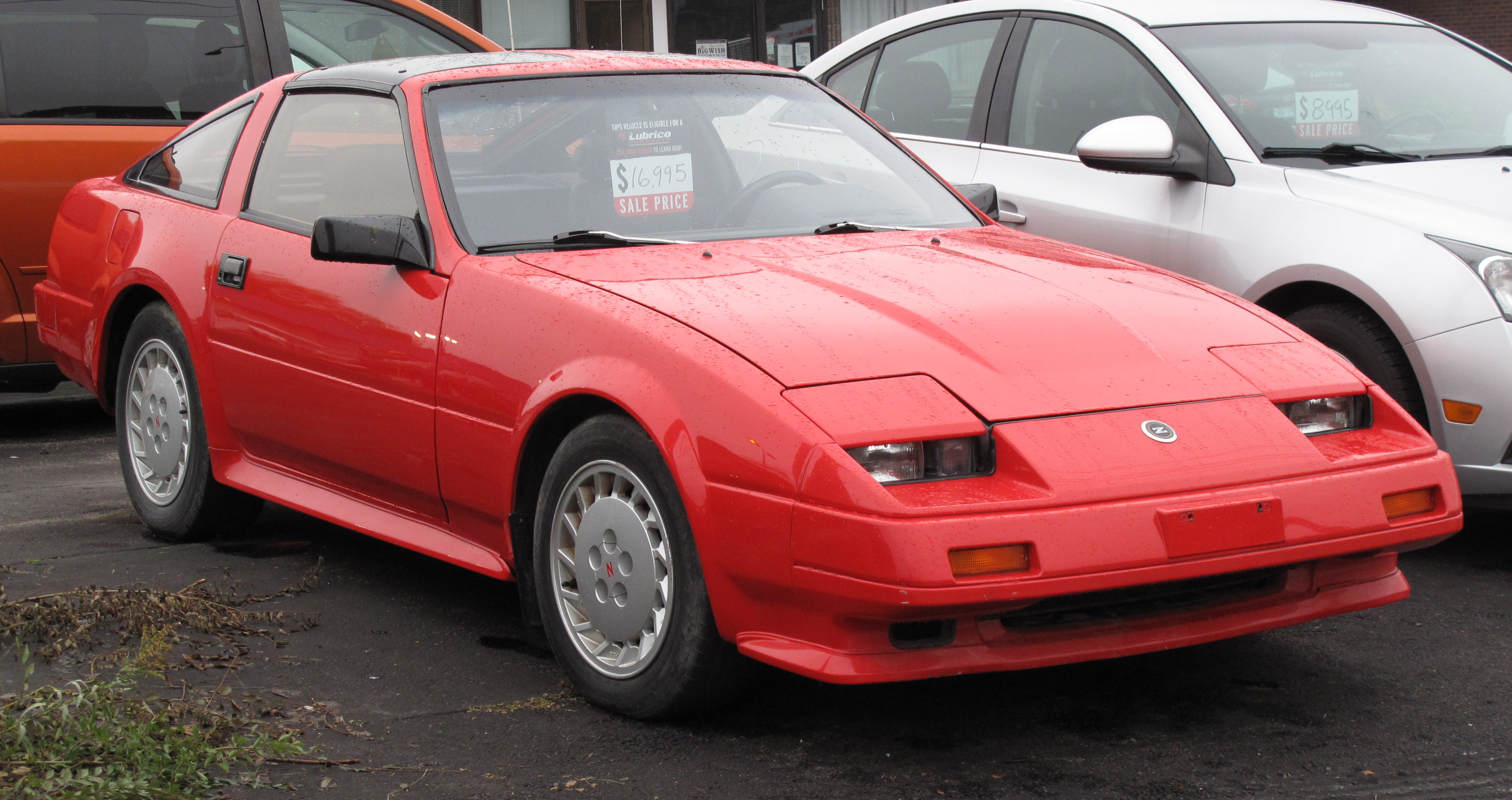
1986 Turbo, front

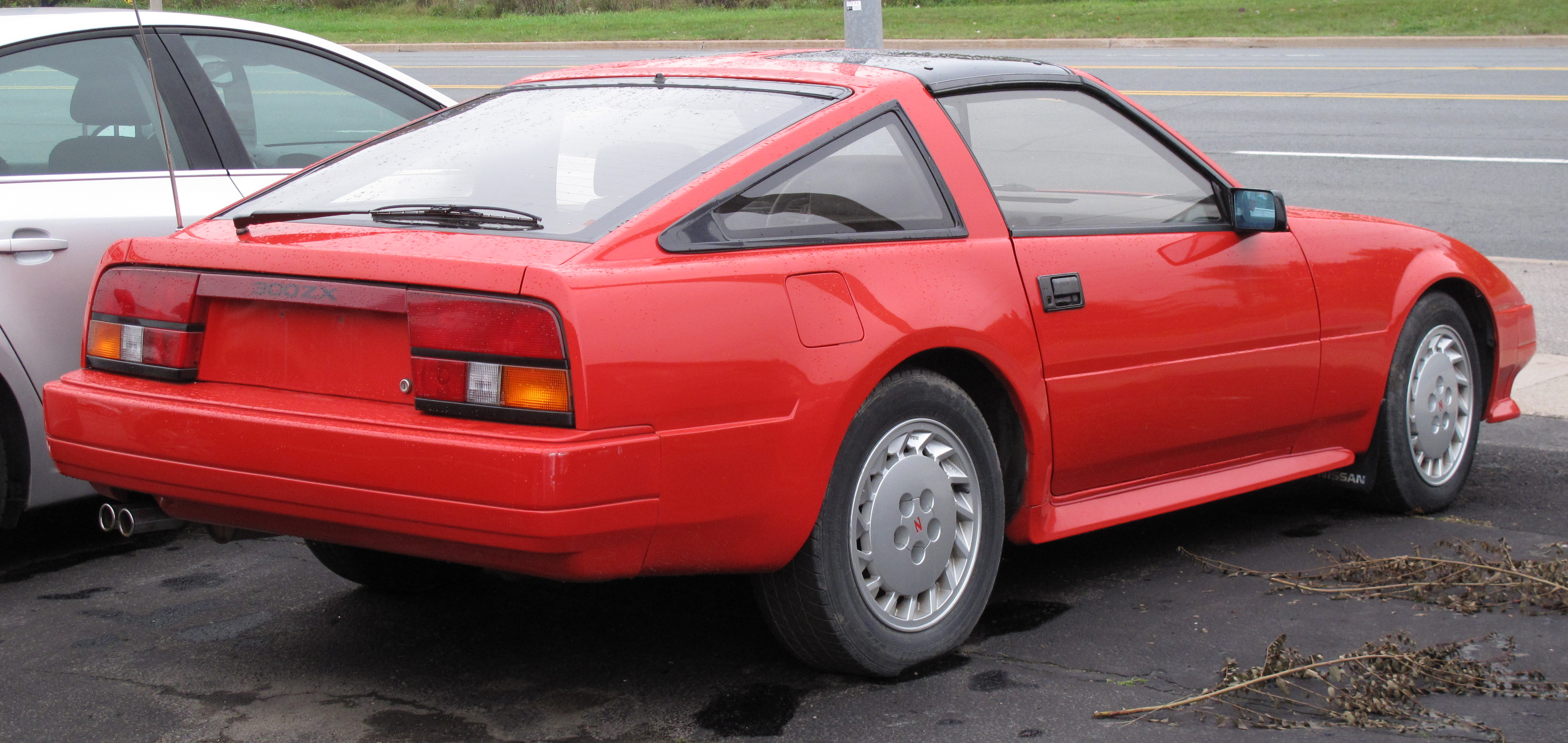
1986 Turbo, rear

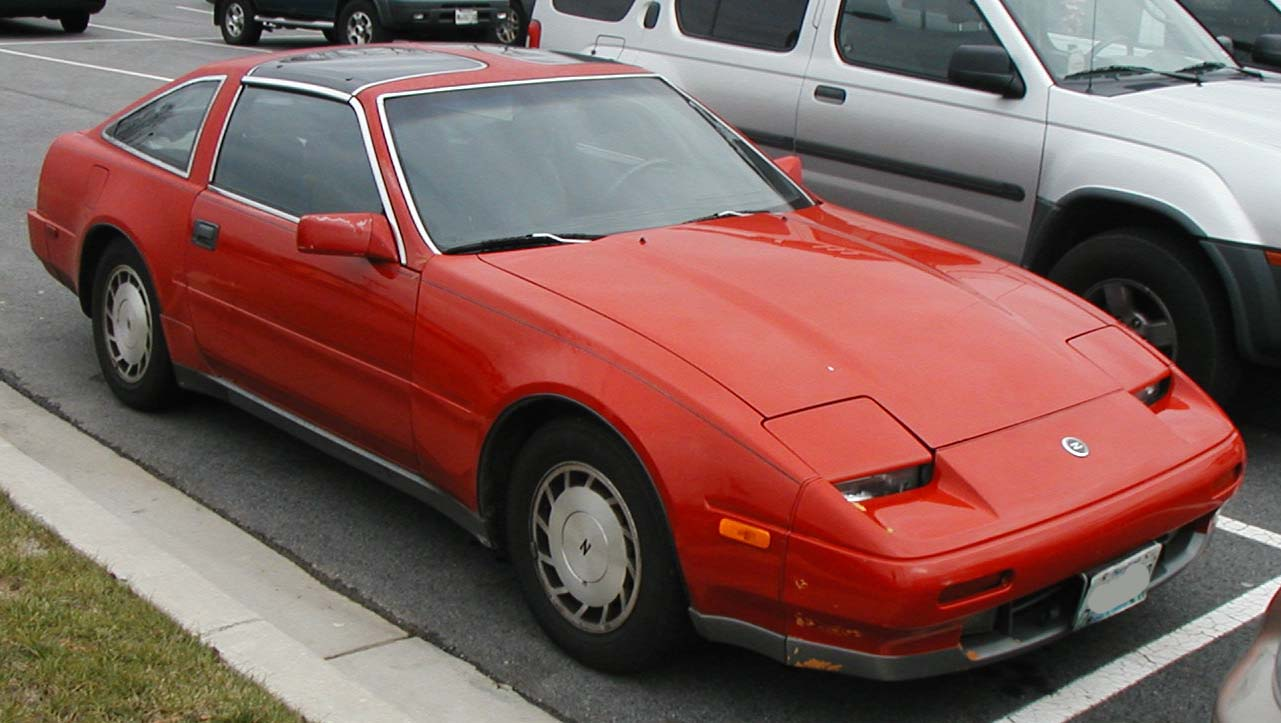
1987–89, front

1989 2+2, rear

As originally released, the Z31 used black polypropylene bumper covers and body side moldings, with black front and rear spoilers. Turbo models had a hood-mounted scoop mounted off-center. All cars were fitted with a T-top roof.

The Z31 body was slightly restyled in 1986 with the addition of side skirts, flared fenders, and 16-inch wheels (turbo models only). Many black plastic trim pieces were also painted to match the body color, and the hood scoop was removed.

The car was given a final makeover in 1987 that included more aerodynamic bumpers, fog lamps within the front air dam, and 9004 bulb-based headlamps that replaced the outdated sealed beam headlights. The 300ZX-titled reflector in the rear was updated to a narrow set of tail lights running the entire width of the car and an LED third brake light on top of the rear hatch. This was the first car in history to have the central brake light with LED, in 1987 model year, made by Stanley Electric.

The Z31 continued selling until 1989, longer than any other Z-Car at the time. Cars produced from 1984 to 1985 are referred to as "Zenki" or "Zenki-gata" models, while cars produced from 1987 to 1989 are known as "Kouki" or "Kouki-gata" models. The 1986 models are unique due to sharing some major features from both. They are sometimes referred to as "Chuki" models, but are usually grouped with the Zenki models because of the head and tail lights.

=== North American market ===
North America was the main market for the 300ZX, as for previous generations of the Z-car. It was introduced to the United States in October 1983, along with the remainder of Nissan's 1984 model year lineup. By now the "Datsun" nameplate had been completely retired in North America. Over 70,000 units were sold in North America in 1985 alone. There were three trim models available: SF, GL, and GLL. The SF model was only available in Canada. The new V6 (2960 cc) Single overhead cam engine was available as a naturally aspirated VG30E or a turbocharged VG30ET producing 160 and 200 hp (119 and 149 kW), respectively. The 1984 to 1987 turbo models featured a Garrett T3 turbocharger with a 7.8:1 compression ratio, whereas 1988 to 1989 models featured a low inertia T25 turbocharger with an increased 8.3:1 compression ratio and slightly more power — 165 hp (123 kW) naturally aspirated and 205 hp (153 kW) turbocharged.

For the 1986 model year, the base two-seater model was made available without the T-bars, creating a lower cost entry-level version.

==== Special editions ====
1984 50th Anniversary Edition 300ZX

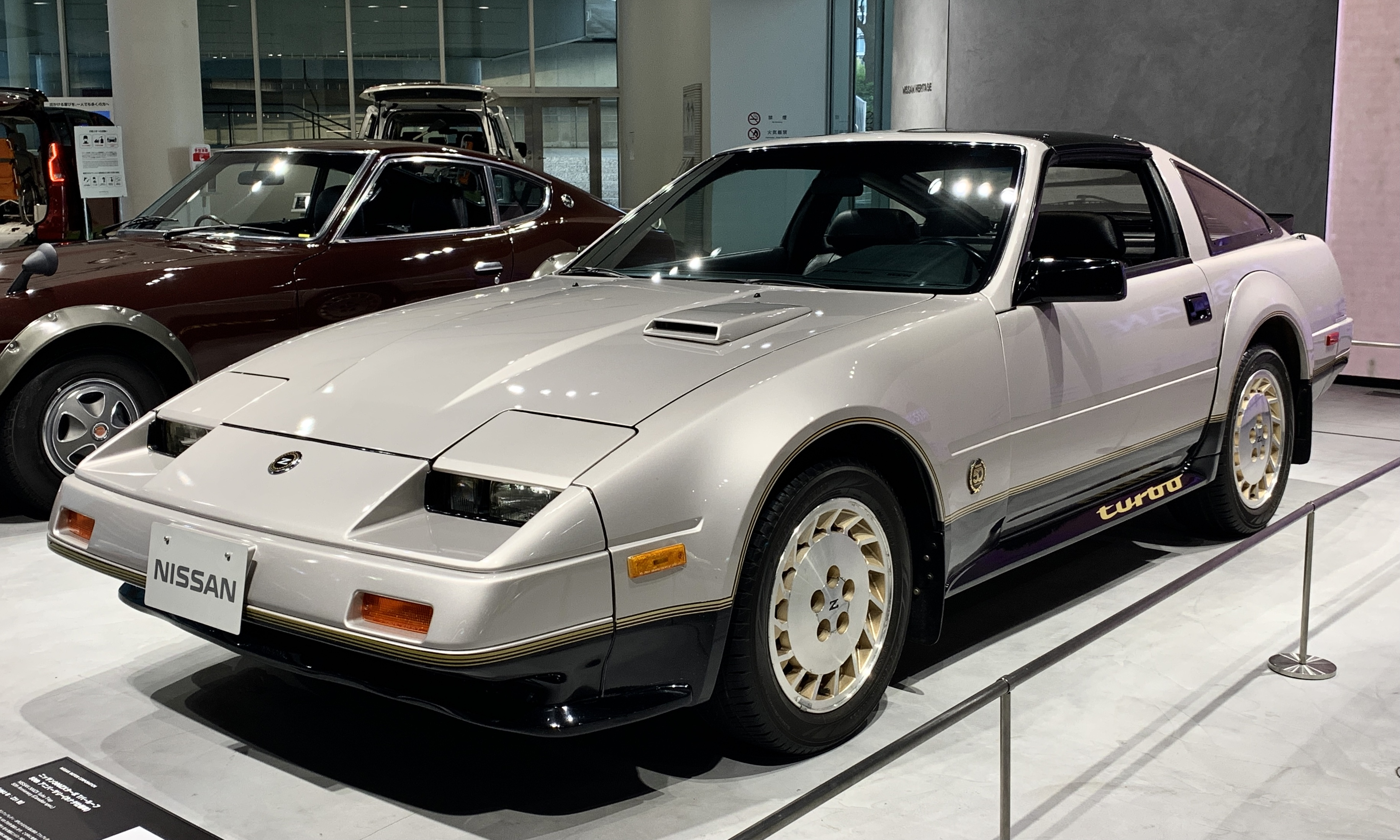
Front

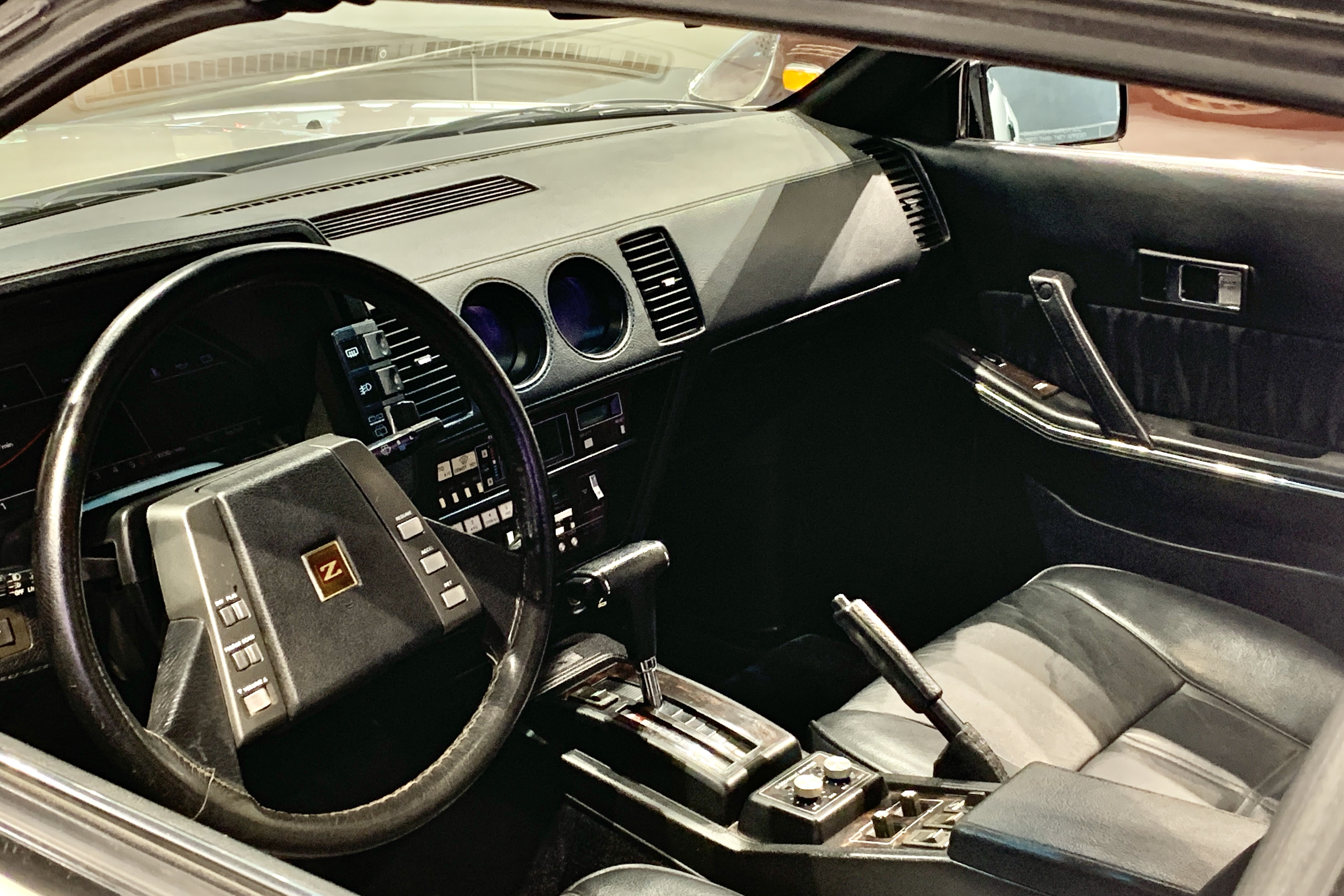
Interior

Two Special Edition versions of the Z31 generation model were produced by Nissan; a 50th Anniversary Edition celebrated the company's semi-centennial in 1984 and offered additional luxury features, and a "Shiro Special", released four years later, with performance-oriented upgrades.

The 1984 300ZX 50th Anniversary Edition, released to celebrate the automaker's half-century, was a turbocharged coupé (two-seater) model with a Light Pewter/Thunder Black color scheme. All 50th Anniversary Editions came equipped with a digital dash and ancillary gauges including average mileage, G-force, and compass readouts, in-car electronic adjustable shocks, Bodysonic speakers in the seats, cruise and radio controls in the steering wheel, mirrored t-tops, embroidered leather seats, embroidered floor mats, 16 inches (406 mm) aluminum wheels, rear fender flares, flared front fenders, a 50th AE logo badge on the driver's side front fender, and grey cloth indoor car cover with 50AE printing. The only option available to the 50th Anniversary Edition was the choice between an automatic or a 5-speed manual transmission. 5,148 AE models were produced for the U.S. market and 300 for the Canadian market. A non-turbo 2+2 model was also available with 50AE badging in the Australian market.

1988 Shiro Special 300ZX

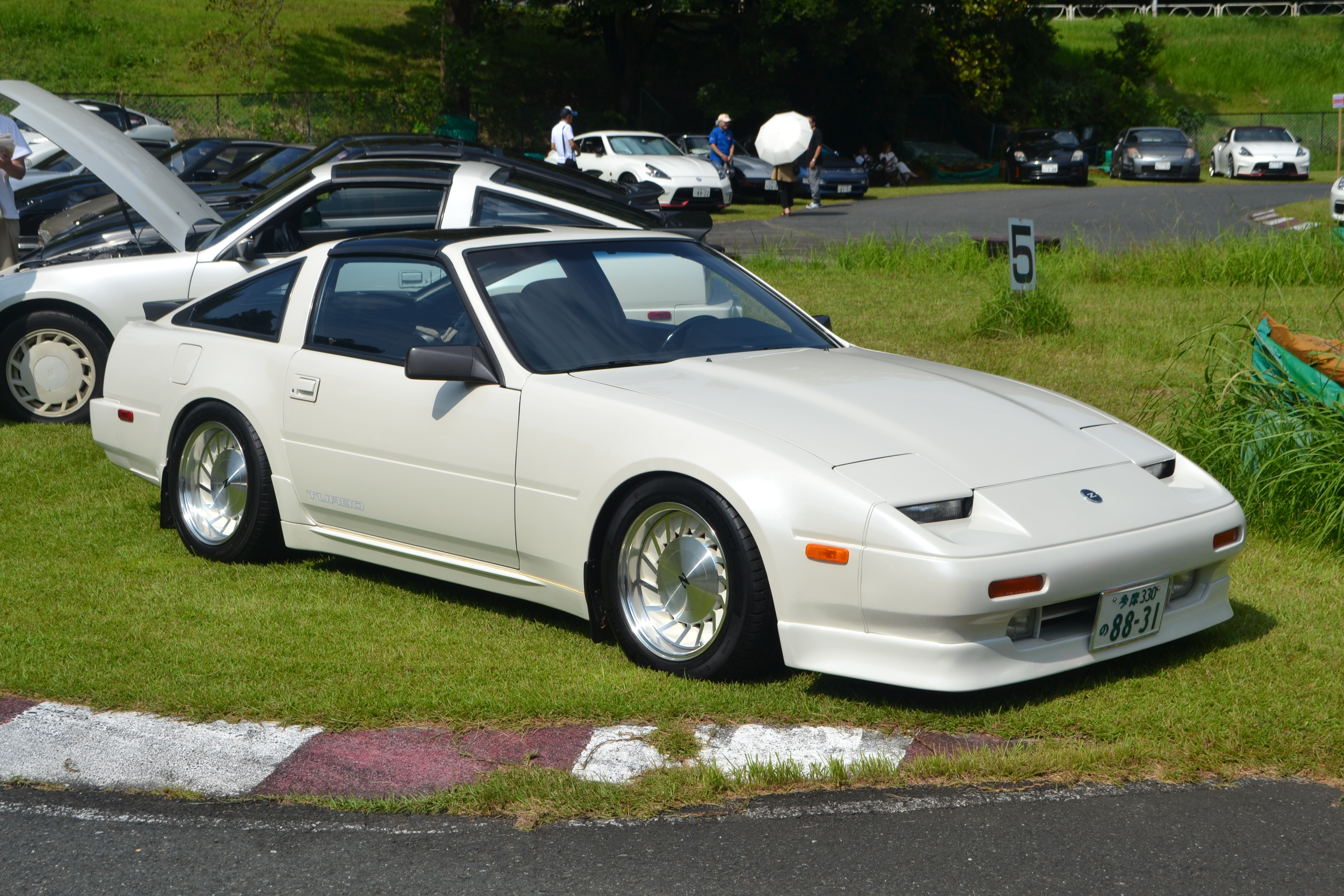
Front

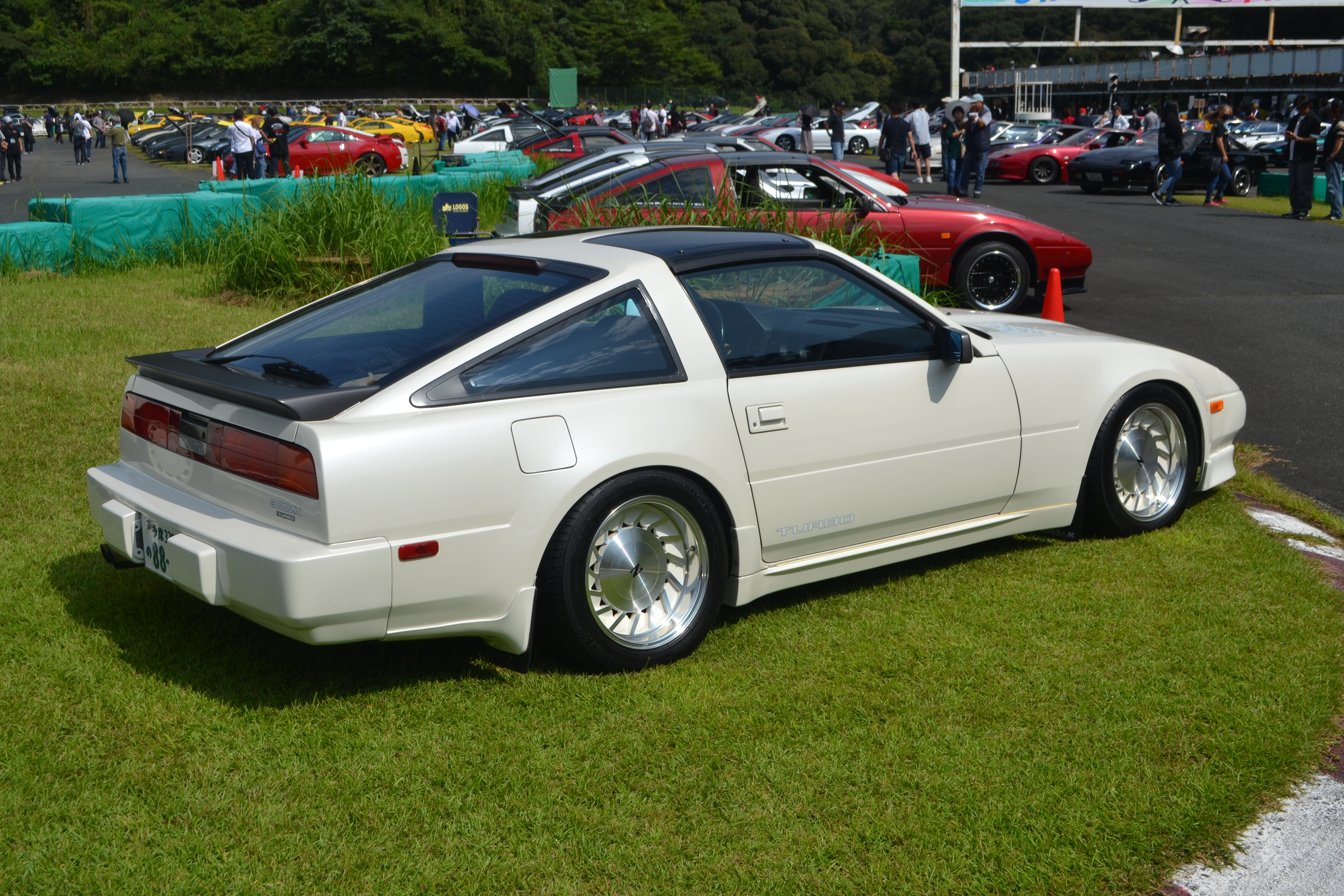
Rear

In 1988, the turbocharged Shiro Special debuted with pearl white paint, stiffer springs and matched shocks, heavy-duty anti-sway bars, a unique front air dam, paint matched wheels, Recaro seats with matching door panels, painted bumperettes, white painted door handles and a viscous limited-slip differential. No options were available for the Shiro. It was the fastest car out of Japan, capable of 153 mph (246 km/h) speeds, as tested by Motor Trend with the electronic speed limiter disabled. A total of 1,002 Shiro Special Z31s were produced for the U.S. market between January and March 1988, plus an additional 75 units for the Canadian market.

=== Japanese market ===
In Japan, the Z31 was marketed as the Fairlady Z and was originally only available with two turbocharged engines: the 170 PS (125 kW) VG20ET in the regular Fairlady Z and the 230 PS (169 kW) VG30ET in the Fairlady Z 300ZX. Both outputs are JIS Gross and both engines use the Garrett AiResearch T03 turbocharger. The 300ZX, unencumbered by Japanese Government dimension regulations restricting overall width to less than 1,700 mm (67 in) was somewhat wider than the 2-liter models, at 1,725 mm (67.9 in). Japanese 300ZX buyers were liable for additional yearly taxes that affected sales. As originally introduced, all Japanese market Fairlady Z's were slicktops, but the T-top option was made available in February 1984.

The 2-liter models later gained the 200Z, 200ZG, or 200ZS monikers to help differentiate from the larger, three-liter models. They all used the VG20ET. The 300ZX, meanwhile, came with the VG30ET, with similar specifications to the USDM model. The only Fairlady Z variant to use the VG30DE engine, and the only Japanese-market model with a naturally aspirated engine, was the 300ZR. It continued to be marketed as a companion fastback to the more formal appearance of the Nissan Skyline-based Nissan Leopard coupé at Nissan Store Japanese dealerships.

The 200ZR was introduced in October 1985, and the VG20-powered models were discontinued. The new version featured the RB20DET NICS, which was the first generation of the RB engine to combine the DOHC, four valve per cylinder head with turbocharging. The 200ZR also featured the world's first ceramic turbocharger, which was a jointly developed project between Nissan and NGK and reduced the inertial weight of the turbine rotor by 34% utilizing silicon nitride. Maximum power output is 180 PS (132 kW). The 200ZR was offered on both wheelbases as either a slicktop (200ZR-I) or as a T-top (200ZR-II). 1985 to 1986 model year examples feature a wider centrally mounted hood scoop to feed air to the top mount intercooler. This hood scoop was redesigned to be much smaller and more aerodynamic with the October 1986 facelift, which made for a smoother appearance. Additionally, the smaller engine in the 200ZR dropped the cars weight by 170 kg (375 lb) compared to cars equipped with the VG30ET, dramatically changing how the car handled and the weighting of the steering. Every 200ZR came equipped with the R200 clutch-pack type limited-slip differential (featuring the lowest available gear ratio on any Z31), stiffer springs and shocks, ZR specific seats/upholstery, a ZR specific steering wheel (for 1985 and 1986 models only), and ZR specific white faced gauges. Recaro seats were optional in all facelifted ZR models (including the 300ZR), in both 2+0 and 2+2 configurations (rear seats were trimmed to match the front seats). Much like the Fairlady Z 432, the 200ZR features the letter "P" in its chassis code (either as a PZ31 for 2+0 models or PGZ31 for 2+2 models. For reference, the 432's chassis code is PS30). 8283 examples were made between 1985 and 1988 (although some examples registered as model year 1989 do exist). The production numbers between the "I" and "II" models are as follows: 1044 200ZR-I: 880 2+0, 164 2+2. All 200ZR-I's came with manual transmissions, crank windows, manual seats, and without T-tops. 7239 200ZR-II: 1126 2+0, 6113 2+2. Between the transmission options available for the "II" model, 2345 were automatics, and 4894 were manuals. While by this point the Z31 had morphed into more of a GT, the 200ZR was an attempt by Nissan's engineers to claw back some of the sporty driving characteristics of the original S30 Fairlady Z/Datsun 240Z. The more responsive engine, lighter body, shorter gearing, and stiffer suspension demonstrate this.

With the October 1986 facelift, claimed power of the turbocharged 300ZX dropped to 195 PS (143 kW) as Nissan changed from Gross to Net ratings. This was also when the DOHC, naturally aspirated, 300ZR model was added to the lineup, with 190 PS (140 kW), making for three differently engined models with nearly the same performance. The 300ZR was positioned as a sportier alternative to the 300ZX Turbo, with tighter suspension settings and an R200 limited-slip differential, while the turbocharged 300ZX was now only offered with full equipment and an automatic transmission. The 200ZR was the budget alternative as it fit into a lower tax and insurance category, thanks to its smaller engine.

=== European models ===
The European turbo models, as well as those sold in other markets unencumbered by strict emissions regulations, produce 228 PS (168 kW; 225 hp) due to higher lift and higher duration on the camshaft profile, also known outside of Europe as the Nismo camshafts. The two-seater model was not available in mainland Europe but was available in the United Kingdom. Some models were also equipped without catalytic converters. All European turbocharged models received a different front lower spoiler as well, with pre-facelift models being unique and post-1987 production having the same spoiler as the USDM 1988 Shiro Special model.

Swedish- and Swiss-market models (as well as those sold in Australia) received exhaust gas recirculation control systems to meet those countries particular emissions regulations.

=== Australian models ===
All Australian model Z31 300ZXs were 2+2 T-top body, with an engine offering of either the 3.0L V6 N/A VG30E, or the 3.0L V6 Turbo Charged VG30ET. The cars sold in 1984 and 1985 were all naturally aspirated with no catalytic converter, while the turbocharged version was the only model available from 1986 to 1988. There was only one trim level in Australia, with the digital dashboard and climate control being an optional upgrade package, and leather seats only available in the redesigned series 3 "Californian" models. The Australian factory service manual provides camshaft measurements which do not match any of the known USDM or EDM camshaft profiles, the FSM states the exhaust valve has an open duration of 252 degrees, but the specified opening and closing angles add up to 258 degrees. All Australian publication content express that N/A versions possess 166 hp (124 kW), along with the turbocharged versions as 208 hp (155 kW). The Australian 50th Anniversary Edition was more basic than the U.S. version, the 50th AE was a normal n/a 300ZX with the digital dash package, a black interior, black velour seats, and a 50th AE badge on the exterior. The exterior badge was fixed to the cars by dealerships, so the position of the badge is not the same on all models. There was no Shiro Special in Australia, and no models featured the adjustable shock absorbers.

== Z32 ==
Z32
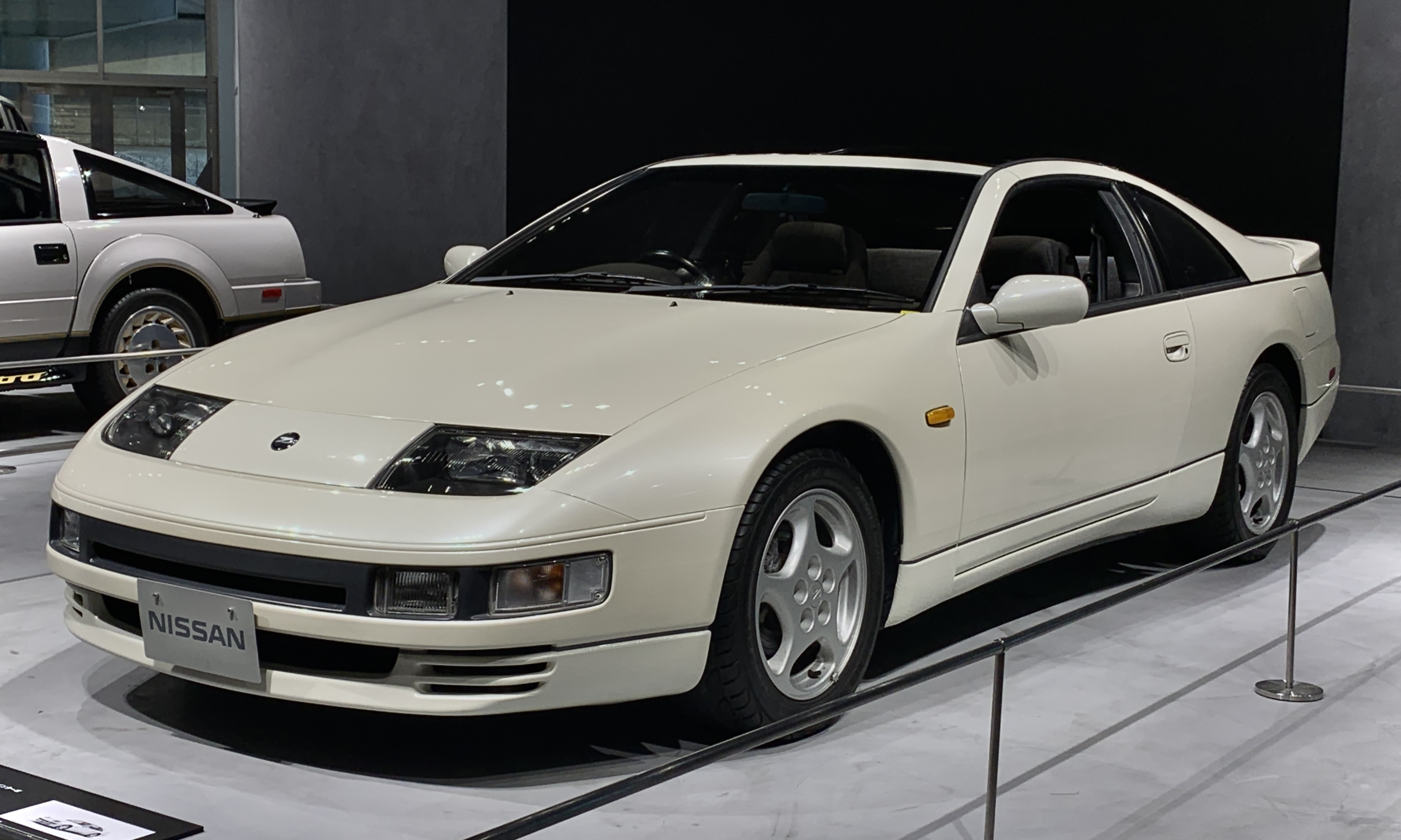

Overview
- Also called: Nissan Fairlady Z
- Production: February 1989–2000 (Japan); number produced: 164,170; (export: 99,286); (domestic: 64,884)
- Model years: 1990–1996
- Assembly: Japan: Hiratsuka, Kanagawa (Nissan Shatai); South Africa: Rosslyn, South Africa (from 1992 to 1994, Nissan South Africa)
- Designer: Isao Sono & Toshio Yamashita (1986)

Body and chassis
- Body style: 2-door convertible; 3-door 2-seater coupé or T-top; 3-door 2+2 T-top

Powertrain
- Engine: 3.0 L VG30DE V6; 3.0 L VG30DETT twin-turbo V6
- Transmission: 5-speed RS5R30A manual; 4-speed RE4R01A Automatic; 4-speed RE4R03A automatic

Dimensions
- Wheelbase: 2,450 mm (96.5 in) 2+0; 2,550 mm (100.4 in) 2+2
- Length: 4,305 mm (169.5 in) 2+0; 4,520 mm (178.0 in) 2+2
- Width: 1,790 mm (70.5 in) 2+0; 1,800 mm (70.9 in) 2+2
- Height: 1,250 mm (49.2 in) '90-'92; 1,255 mm (49.4 in) '90-'92 TT T-Top; 1,229 mm (48.4 in) '93-'98; 1,222 mm (48.1 in) '93-'98 2+2; 1,227 mm (48.3 in) '96-'98 Hardtop; 1,255 mm (49.4 in) '90-'92 Convertible; 1,257 mm (49.5 in) '93-'95 Convertible; 1,237 mm (48.7 in) '96-'98 Convertible
- Curb weight: '95 models w/manual transmission: 3,290 lb (1,492 kg) 2+0 NA (USDM) Hardtop; 3,350 lb (1,520 kg) 2+0 NA (USDM) T-top; 3,320 lb (1,506 kg) 2+0 TT (JDM) Hardtop; 3,422 lb (1,552 kg) 2+0 TT (USDM) T-top; 3,445 lb (1,563 kg) 2+0 (USDM) Convertible; 3,414 lb (1,549 kg) 2+2 (USDM) NA T-top; 3,582 lb (1,625 kg) 2+2 (JDM) TT T-top

Chronology
- Predecessor: Nissan 300ZX (Z31)
- Successor: Nissan 350Z (Z33)

=== Design ===
Body variations

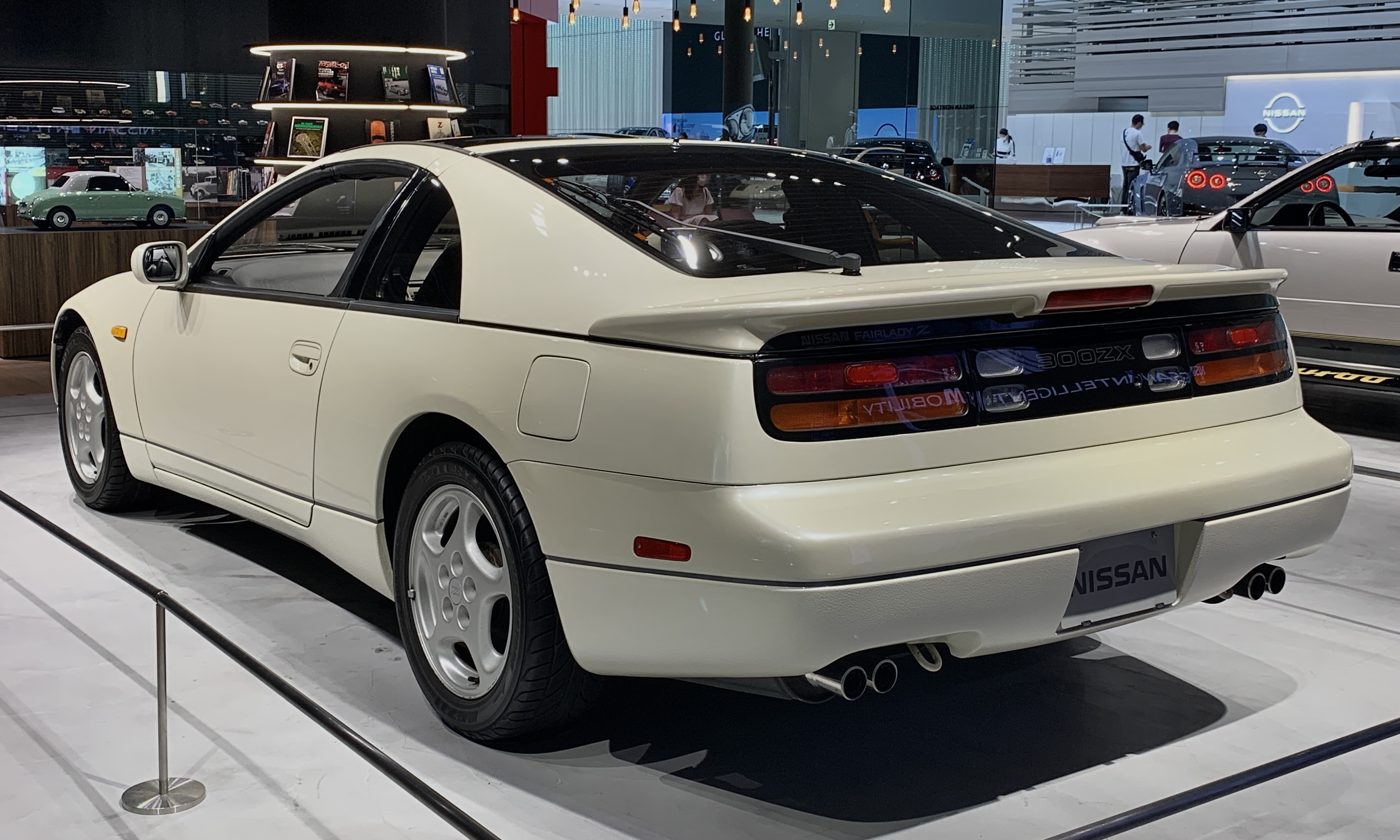
Rear view

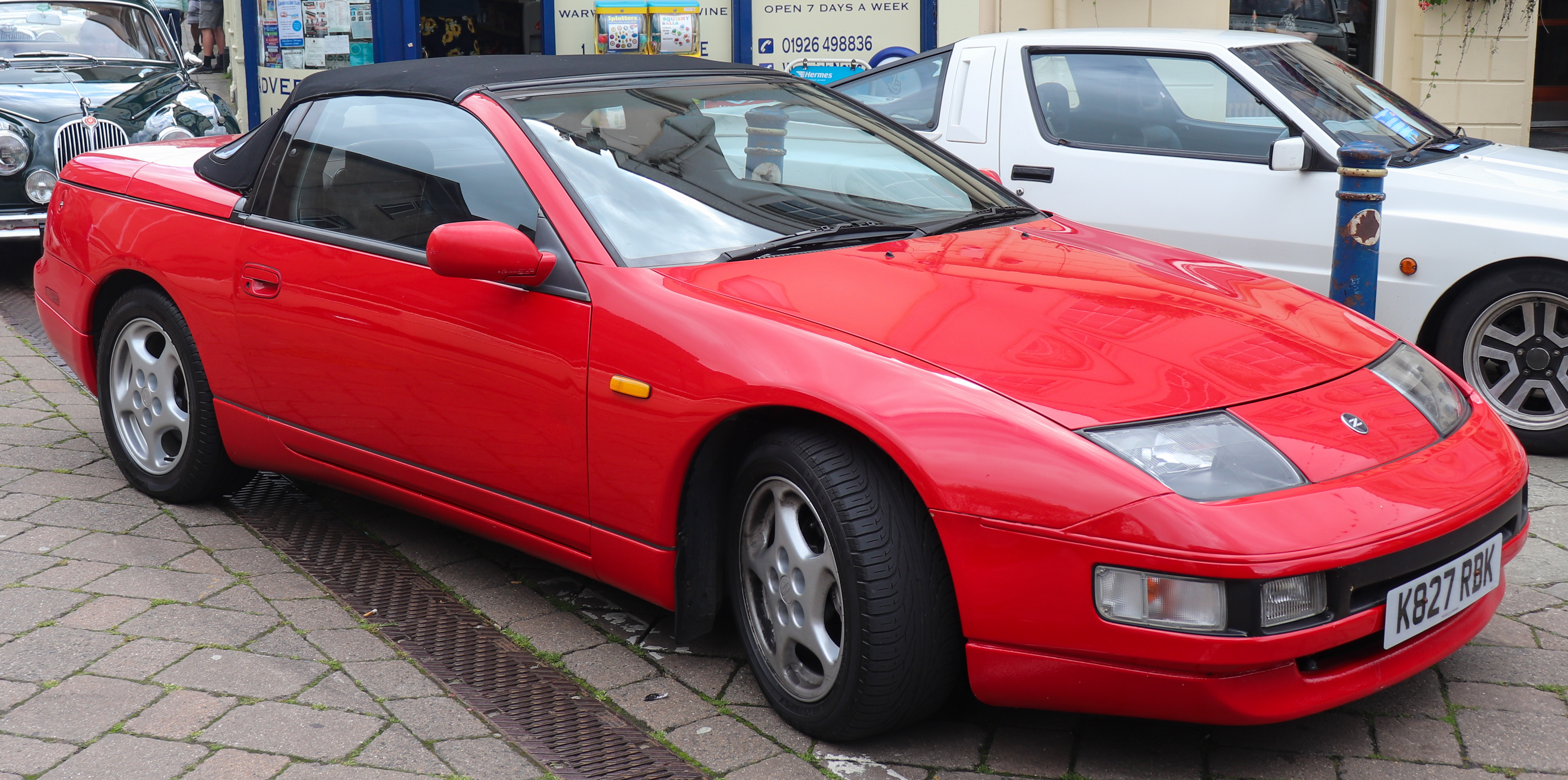
Convertible

The Z32 was designed by Isao Sono and Toshio Yamashita, approved in final form by Nissan management on October 1, 1986. The body was wider with a rounder profile and fewer hard edges. It had a marginally increased coefficient of drag of 0.31, compared to the Z31's 0.30. Nissan utilized the Cray-2 supercomputer to design the new Z32 with a form of CAD software making it one of the first production cars to utilize this tool.

Like previous generations, Nissan offered a 4-seater (2+2) model with the Z32. All Z32s initially featured T-tops as standard. A hardtop model was available in North America, only in non-turbo models, and in Japan was available along with an extremely rare Twin Turbo model (Japan-only). All "Slicktops" were 2 seaters (2+0), unlike its predecessor.

300ZX Spyder Concept
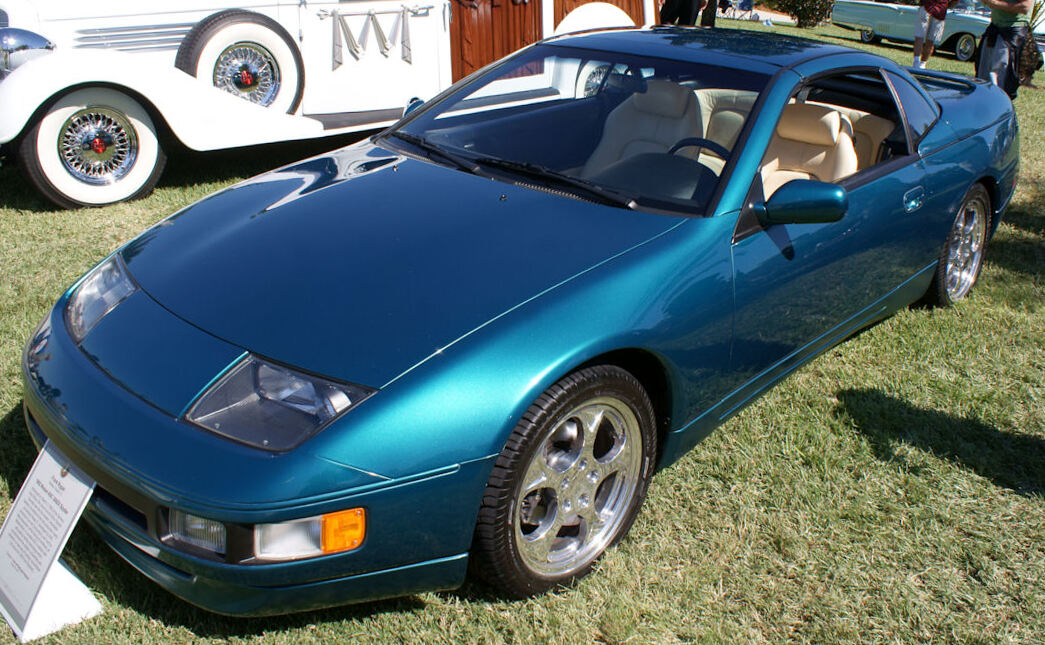
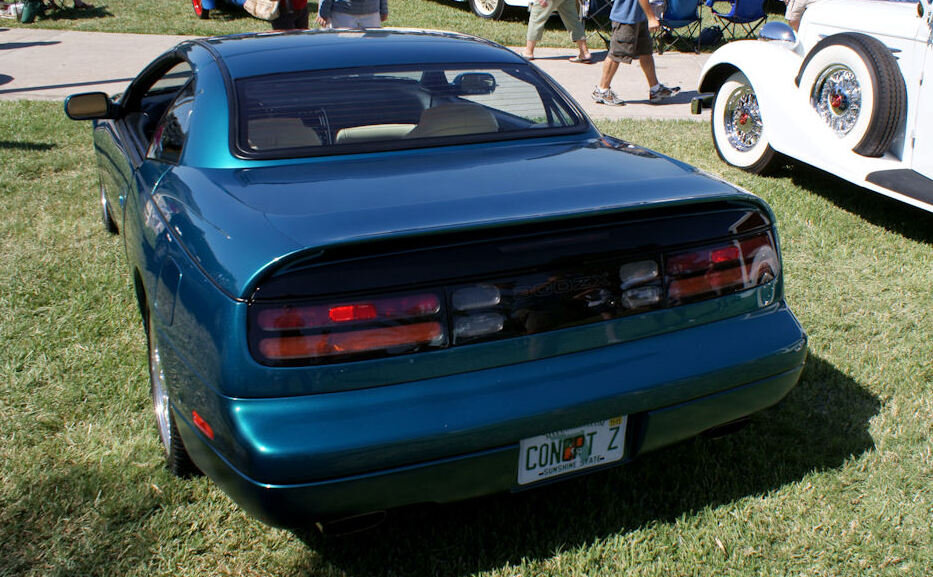

In 1992, a 2-seat convertible version (produced by ASC) was introduced for the first time, in response to aftermarket conversions. The same year, ASC also presented a 300ZX Spyder Concept - a version with a retractable hardtop on a LWB (2+2) - which they only built one example of.

=== Mechanical ===
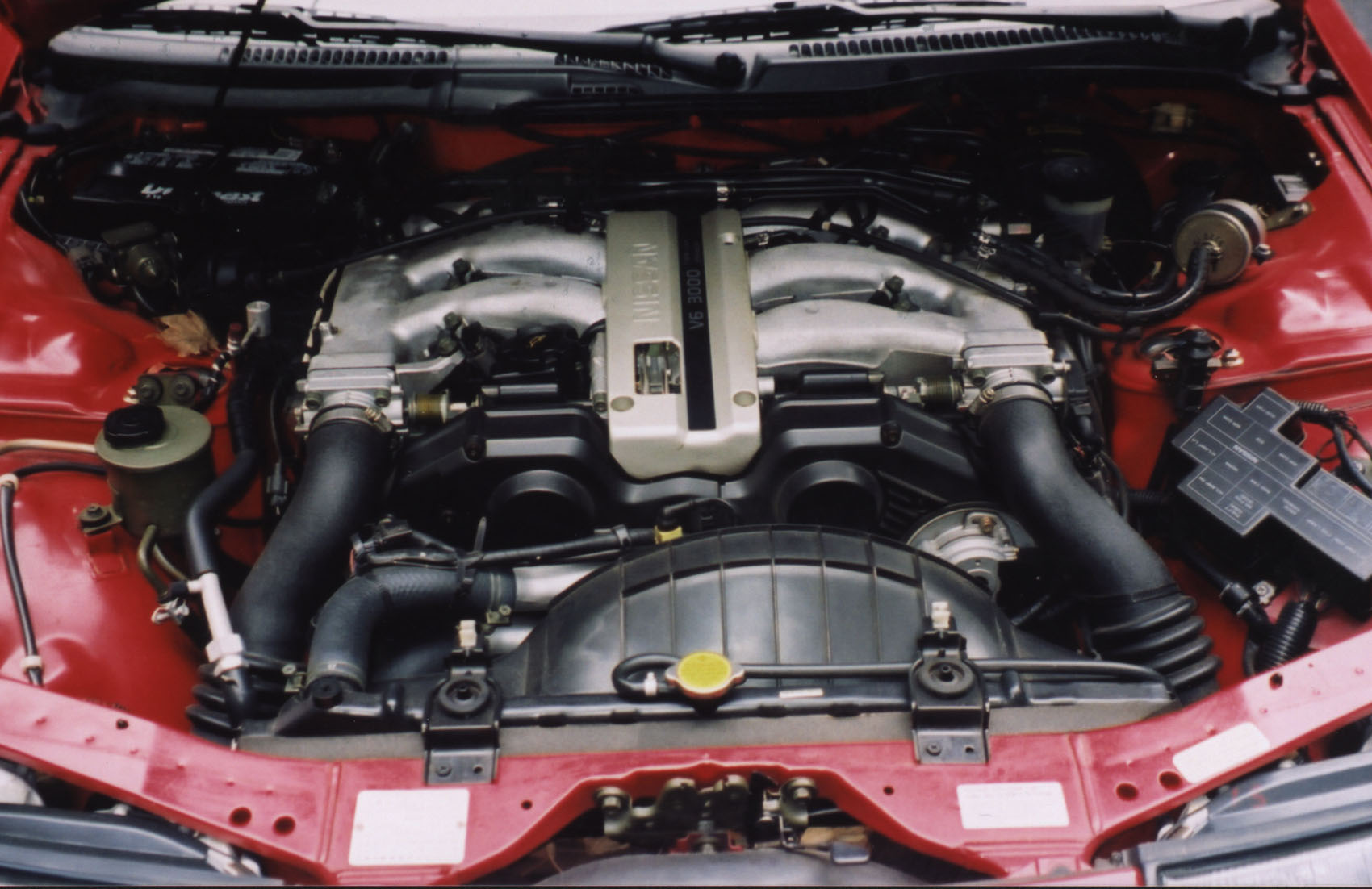
Naturally aspirated VG30DE

The 2,960 cc (3.0 L) VG30DE V6 engine was carried over from the previous generation 300ZX (Z31), but fitted with a DOHC head and variable valve timing (N-VCT), producing 222 bhp (225 PS; 166 kW) at 6,400 rpm and 198 lb⋅ft (268 N⋅m) at 4,800 rpm in naturally aspirated (NA) form. During instrumented testing conducted by Car and Driver in 1989, the NA car recorded a time of 6.7 seconds to accelerate from 0 to 60 mph (97 km/h), an elapsed time of 15.0 seconds over the quarter mile with a trap speed of 93 mph (150 km/h), and a maximum speed of 143 mph (230 km/h).

The high output engine (VG30DETT) was upgraded with Garrett AiResearch parallel twin-turbochargers and dual intercoolers, producing 300 bhp (304 PS; 224 kW) at 6,400 rpm and 283 lb⋅ft (384 N⋅m) of torque at 3,600 rpm. Benefiting from Project 901, the Z32 was the first car to be marketed following the introduction of the 280 PS (206 kW) power ceiling imposed by JAMA that remained until 2004. Performance varied for the sprint from 0 to 60 mph (97 km/h), with recorded times of 5.0-6.0 seconds depending on the source, and a governed top speed of 155 mph (249 km/h).

The engine was detuned to 280 bhp (209 kW) when the optional automatic transmission was fitted, but an automatic-equipped car was slightly faster to accelerate to 100 mph (161 km/h), taking 15.8 seconds compared to 16.3 seconds for the manual.

All Z32s used the same multilink rear suspension, a design shared with other Project 901 cars. Turbo Z32s also featured adjustable two mode suspension and the four-wheel steering systems called "Super HICAS" (High Capacity Actively Controlled Steering), first introduced on the R31 Nissan Skyline.

=== Regional variations ===
==== North America ====
American Z-car sales reached one million sales during the 1990 model year, making it at that time the best selling sports car. In America the 300ZX faced the same fate of many Japanese sports cars of the time. While the 1989 300ZX was priced at around $30,000, its final model year price increased to about $50,000. The mid-1990s marketplace trends toward SUVs and the rising Yen:Dollar ratio contributed to the end of North American 300ZX sales in 1996 with over 80,000 in sales. A Commemorative Edition for the final 300 units shipped to America included decals and certificates of authenticity.

==== Europe ====
Nissan 300ZX 2+0 and 2+2

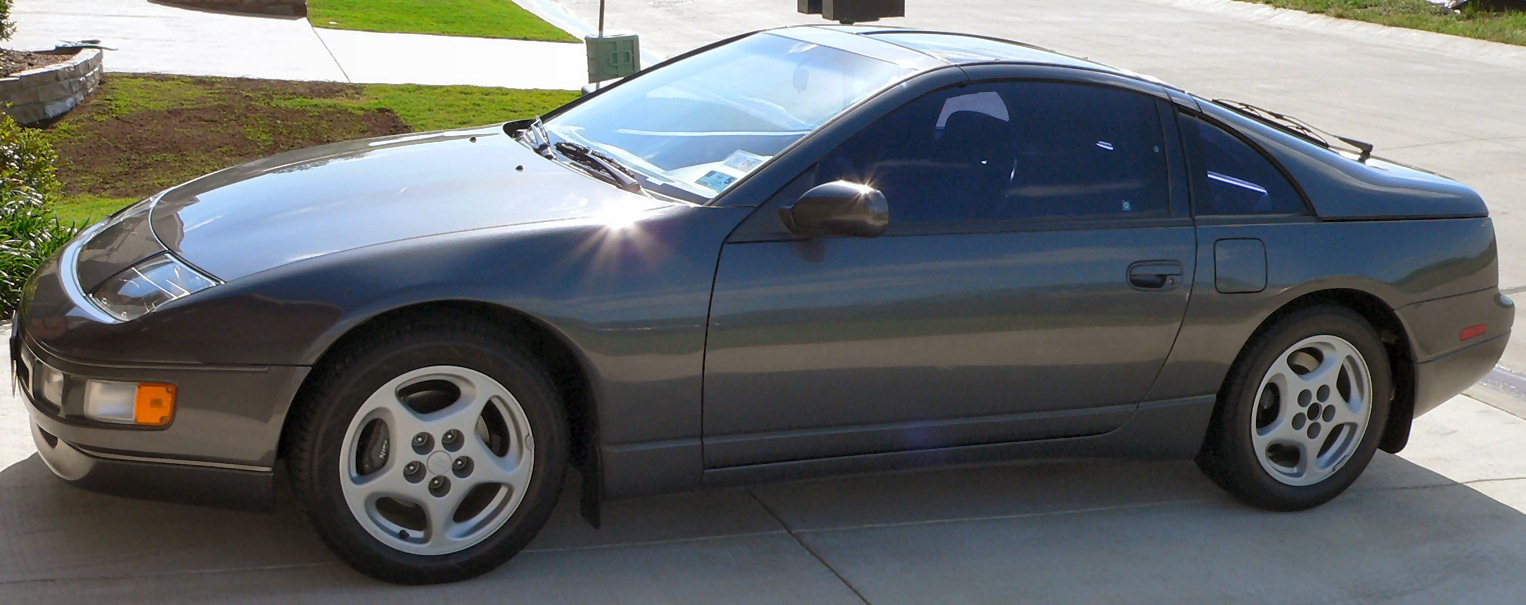
2+0 (fuel door ahead of rear axle)

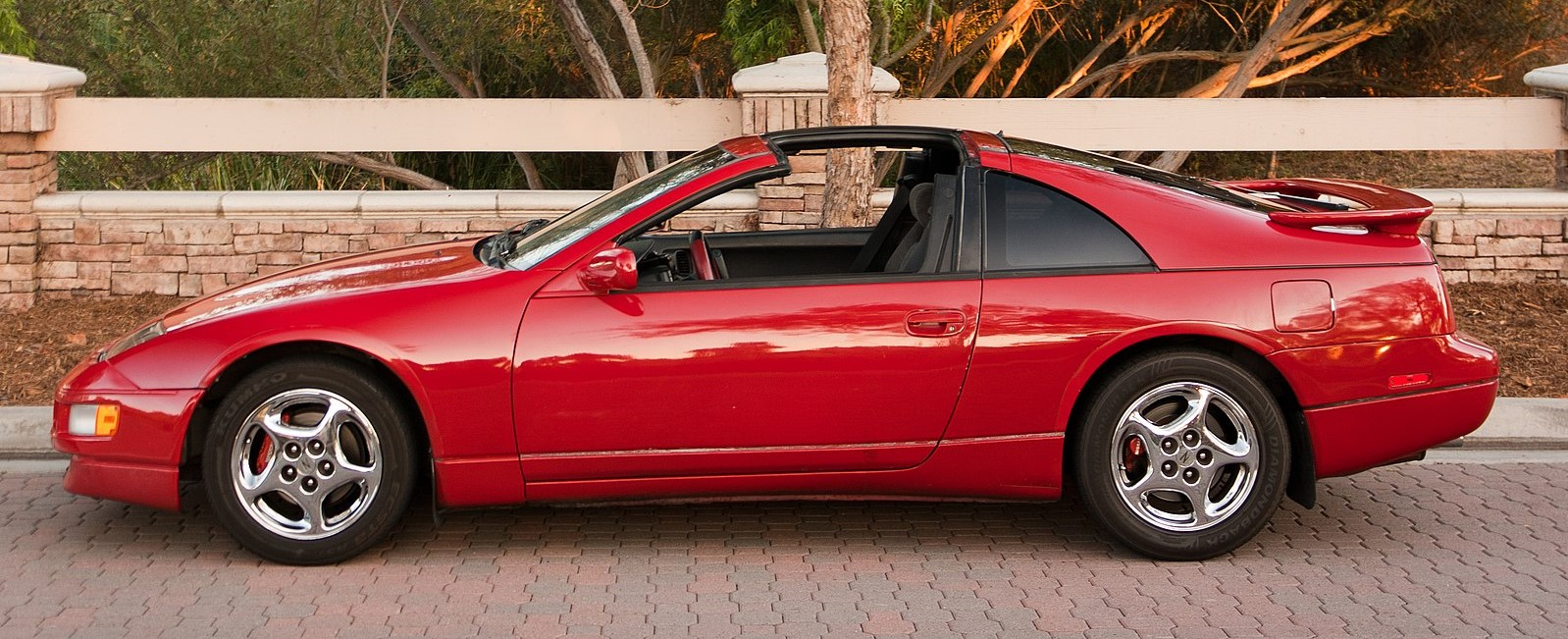
2+2 (fuel door behind rear axle)

Most notable distinguishing feature is the fuel door location.

In the UK and Europe, all Z32s offered were in 2+2 TT form between 1990 and 1996 (1990–1994 for UK). They were sold through dealerships in the UK, France, Germany, Belgium and Italy.

==== Australia ====
In Australia, all Z32s offered were in 2+2 NA from between 1990 and 1995.

==== Japan ====
In Japan, the 300ZX continued until August 2000. The Japanese Domestic Market was offered a number of variants unavailable to the international market such as the "Version S" (Spec Model), "Version R" (Ready Model) and Slicktop Twin Turbo (the most expensive trim option only available in Version S guise).

Version S was a base grade specification that includes all necessary road trim and items as standard, such as stereo and A/C. It could be ordered with various options separately. Options were available separately by order only, and include:

- 2+0 SWB 2-Seater T-Top trim
- 2+0 SWB 2-Seater solid roof (slicktop) trim
- 2+2 LWB 4-Seater T-Top trim
- Automatic Climate Control
- Cruise Control
- 8-way Power Drivers Seat
- 4-way Power Passengers Seat
- Recaro Seats
- BOSE Audio
- VG30DE Naturally Aspirated Engine
- VG30DETT Twin Turbo Engine
- Super HICAS (only available on TT option)
- Anti-Lock Brake System
- Driver-side airbag
- Suede / Tweed / Cloth / Leather Seating
- All other available “Altia” options from order guide

Version R:

Available only on 2+2 LWB 4-Seater with the only major options being in N/A or Twin Turbo configuration, with automatic or manual transmissions, this trim came with preset options from the factory at a reduced (combined) cost, giving customers a “ready” model by which to order if they did not feel like ordering options one by one. This presented buyers with an easier choice selection and a “base model” car by which to settle for.

Standard features (for 1998) included:

- Recaro Seats
- Sideskirts
- Rear Spoiler
- Drivers Side Airbag
- Cloth Seats
- Anti-Lock Brakes
- Xenon HID Headlamps
- Cruise Control
- Automatic Climate Control

The only options were:

- Carbon / Marble Interior Trim
- Audio Equipment Package with EQ.
- Automatic or Manual Transmission
- VG30DE or VG30DETT

The aforementioned facelift of late 1998 featured a new front fascia, tail lights, optional Xenon HID headlights, optional rear spoiler, optional BBS mesh wheels, orange rear corner lights and an instrument cluster with white dials as well as other minor changes.

All JDM Z32s used a front rebar system made out of fiberglass rather than steel (like their American Market counterparts), and also had different exhaust systems with lighter weight Catalytic Converters (with only one set on the JDM Twin Turbo model vs. two sets on the USDM Twin Turbo models). Given the lack of these regulatory items, JDM Z32s were often more than 100 lb (45 kg) lighter than their American specification counterparts.

=== Changes by model year ===
The Z32 chassis underwent some changes during its production run between 1989 and 2000 (Japan) and 1990 to 1996 (US). The Z32's extended model year sales in 1990 reached 39,290 units.

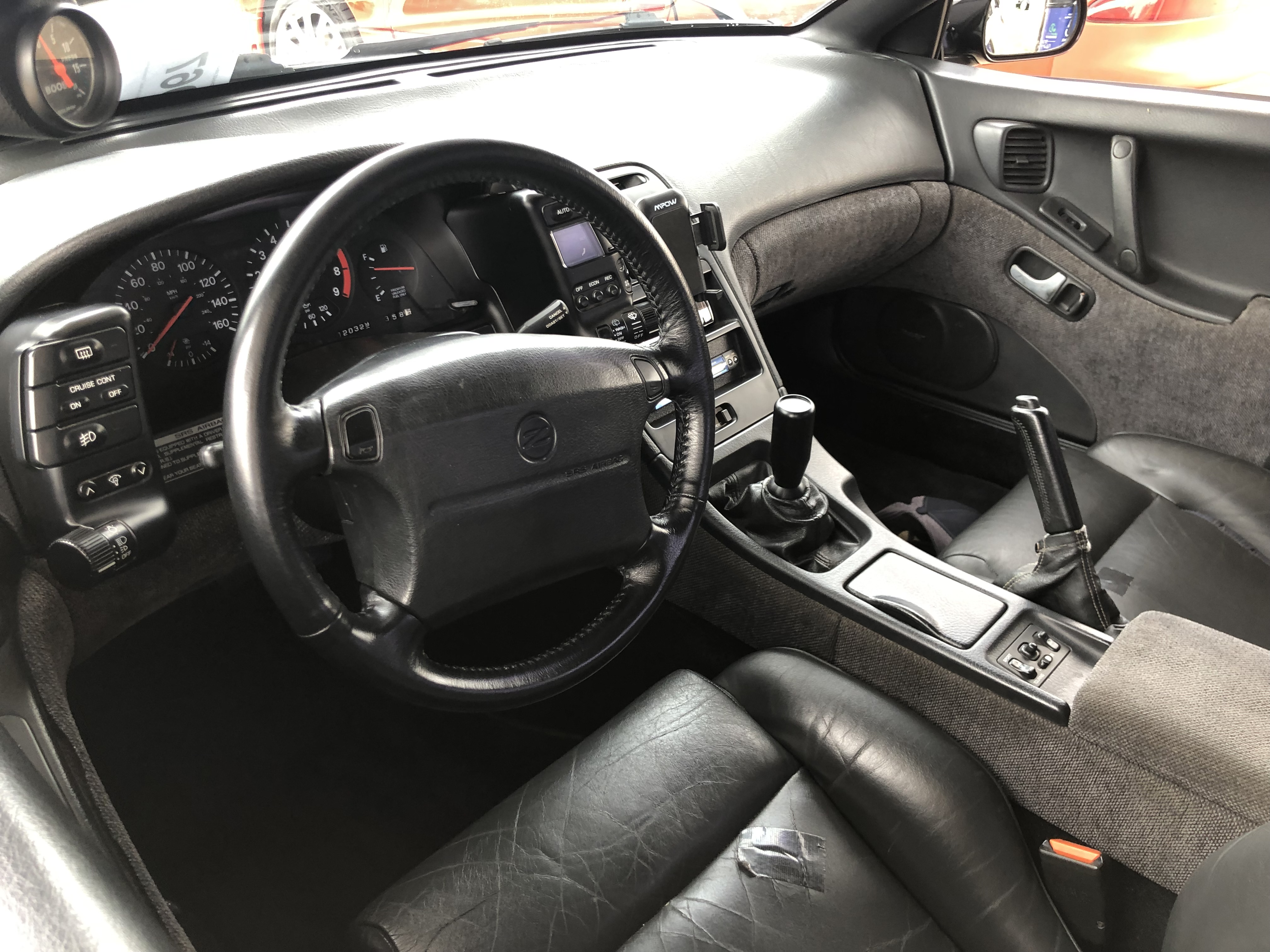
300ZX (Z32) interior

1991

- Manual climate controls discontinued (except convertible models)
- New electronic climate controls allowed control over air flow direction, but the ambient temperature gauge was discontinued
- Air conditioner evaporator valve changed from aluminum to steel to reduce noise
- Driver-side airbag available as an option
- CD player option was added for both the TT and NA (previously only available in the NA), while the Bose stereo head unit changed
- Front brake rotors on NA models were changed to TT units (previous front rotors were 4 mm thinner)
- Brake master cylinder was changed to a new unit (February 1991)
- Nissan logo appears on front nose panel instead of a decal on the front fascia
- Hardtop coupe available mid-year (NA only)
- Floor mat logo changed from "300ZX" to "Z"
- Keyhole on driver's door and interior light illuminates green when door handle is pulled (similar to Z31)
- US sales: 17,652 units

1992

- Driver-side airbag made standard
- Dashboard and door complementary material changed from fabric to suede
- Separate mirror heater switch eliminated (combined with rear defroster switch)
- Power adjustable driver's seat standard on T-top models
- Mirror heaters made standard, and are activated with front windshield defrost button
- US sales: 6,708 units

1993

- Turbo oil line insulation changed
- Convertible option added
- Brake caliper material changed from aluminum to iron
- New style fuel injectors for the non-turbo, (except convertible)
- Upgraded Bose stereo made standard
- Air injection valve (AIV) system eliminated
- Non-turbo model, (except convertible), ECUs changed from 8-bit to 16-bit by Japan Electronic Control System Co.
- US sales: 11,599 units

1994

- Rear spoiler design changed to a taller, pedestal-type
- Seat belts redesigned; attachment points moved from door mounts to pillar mounts
- Super HICAS system changed from hydraulic to electrical actuation (previously power steering actuated)
- New style fuel injectors for the convertible
- Passenger-side airbag introduced and made standard
- Keyless entry added
- Titanium keys discontinued in November 1994
- 'Reset' button removed from clock
- Off-white 'Pearl' color is dropped. Future 'Pearls' are more of a semi-metallic white
- US sales: 5,320 units

1995

- New style fuel injectors for the twin-turbo (Less prone to failure from modern ethanol blended gasoline)
- Front fascia became body colored instead of gray strip
- Twin-turbo model ECUs changed from 8-bit to 16-bit (in late-1994 model year)
- Special 25th Anniversary gold paint available
- Version S trim level made available (Japan only)
- 16-inch BBS mesh wheels made available as an option (Japan only)
- US sales: 3,135 units
- Australian market received 40 only 25th Anniversary Editions with body enhancements including Front lower bar spoiler, grille fascia, High mount rear spoiler, rear bar lower lip, tailgate garnish, wheels and "25th Anniversary" decals.

1996

- Variable cam timing (NVTC) dropped due to emission regulations
- OBD II electronics introduced
- Driver's seat back rest no longer included adjustable side bolsters
- Sales: 2,929 units - the last 300 of which are the "Commemorative Edition"

MY1997-1998 (Japan only)

- Twin-turbo front fascia adopted by all models, presumably to lower production costs
- Lift-style window switches
- Version R trim level made available
- T-top option dropped from 2+0 models
- Automatic transmission option dropped from 2+0 models

MY1999-2000 (Japan only)

- Convertible chassis dropped
- Revised manual transmission using stronger synchronizers to combat a common "soft-synchro" problem that had become apparent on earlier Z32s.
- Instrument cluster with white dials
- New front fascia
- Xenon HID headlights
- New taillights (featuring clear turn signal lenses, chrome housings and black pinstriping)
- New taillight centre panel ("300ZX" lettering in red instead of silver)
- New rear spoiler (standard on TT models, option for NA models)
- New side-skirts (Version R only)
- Door locking mechanism of convertible adopted (all models)
- Steering member bracket and support stay of convertible added to 2+2 models
- Thickness of floor panels and structural members increased for greater rigidity (all models)
- Large central cross member added for greater rigidity (Version R only)

=== Tuned variants ===
In 1990, Motorsports International of Waco, Texas collaborated with Japanese tuning company HKS to create the SR-71 Z32, named for the Lockheed SR-71 Blackbird. The cars were upgraded with larger Garrett turbochargers, HKS electronics and a Kaminari body kit designed by Pete Brock. The SR-71 was California CARB certified and was to be sold through a select dealer network and Japanese performance tuning shops located within the United States. It was planned to build 500 cars per year through 1993. One hundred orders were already in hand, but it is claimed that just eight cars were built. The base price was $65,000 for the Z32 and SR-71 conversion.

In 1995 and 1996, Steve Millen Motorsports (Stillen), developed a SMZ model with Nissan North America that were sold throughout the U.S. and Canada through designated Nissan dealerships. The performance upgrades were covered by the factory warranty. These performance upgrades included: Skyline Group N/GT-R Brakes, which were cross drilled and axially vented rotors with larger calipers and pistons and upgraded HI-Metal front and rear brake pads; a high flow intake system, which allowed the engine to run more efficiently; an aluminized steel free flow exhaust system, which extended from the catalytic converter; and a turbocharger boost pressure increase, bringing the total output to 365 bhp (272 kW) and 332 lb⋅ft (450 N⋅m). Each vehicle was numbered in the engine bay and interior. A total of 104 SMZs were produced at $14,000 more than the standard Nissan Z32 Twin Turbo.

=== Advertising ===
Nissan aired a commercial during Super Bowl XXIV in 1990 advertising the new Nissan 300ZX Twin Turbo. The 60-second commercial was directed by Ridley Scott and only aired once. Executives at Nissan pulled the commercial after the initial airing when they became concerned the commercial would promote street racing since the commercial features the 300ZX being faster than a sport bike, a Formula One car and a fighter jet.

Another memorable 300ZX commercial is "Toys" from 1996. Inspired by the film Toy Story, the commercial is set to Van Halen's cover of "You Really Got Me" and depicts a G. I. Joe-like action figure coming to life, getting behind the wheel of a red 300ZX radio-controlled car and picking up a Barbie-like doll for a date, stealing her away from her husband, who resembles Ken. They then drive around the feet of Mr K, a caricature of former Nissan executive Yutaka Katayama acted by Dale Ishimoto, who smiles as he watches them go by. Toy manufacturer Mattel filed a lawsuit against Nissan in 1997, claiming the ad's use of dolls that resemble G. I. Joe, Barbie and Ken amounted to "trademark and copyright infringement" and caused "irreparable injury to Mattel's name, business reputation and goodwill." Mattel sought unspecified damages and an injunction that would pull the ad off the air. Nissan defended the ad, claiming that the dolls were named "Roxanne", "Nick" and "Tad" and that they were modeled after celebrities. Mattel and Nissan eventually settled the lawsuit out of court and observers noted that the lawsuit ultimately just gave Nissan and the advertisement further exposure and publicity.

== Motorsports ==
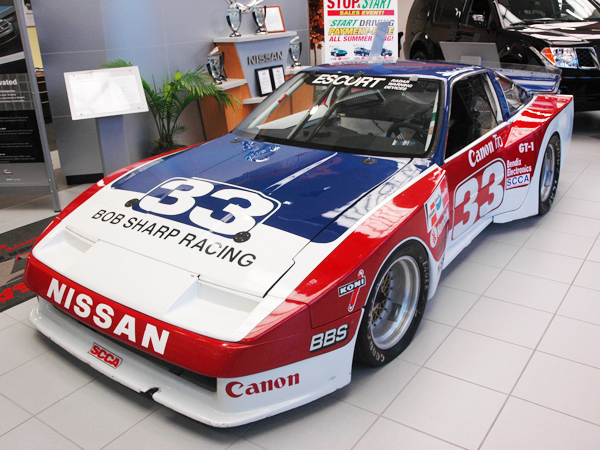
Paul Newman's 300ZX won the 1986 Trans Am at Lime Rock for Bob Sharp Racing

The 300ZX was campaigned during 1984 and 1985 in showroom stock racing. The car scored a Trans Am win in 1986 at Lime Rock by Paul Newman for Bob Sharp Racing. This would be the only Trans Am win by a 300ZX.

From 1985 to 1987, the Electramotive-developed GTP ZX-Turbo was raced in the IMSA GT Championship's GTP class and also the All Japan Sports Prototype Championship, badged as a Fairlady Z, using a Lola T810 chassis and a VG30ET engine. Following development through 1987, the car would become dominant in IMSA GT in 1988. Additional factory endorsement, combined with a new chassis, transmission and more reliable Goodyear tires contributed to the team's success. The SOHC VG30ET was making upwards of 1,000 hp (700 kW), with a power band that extended from 4,000 to 9,000 rpm on a single turbo.

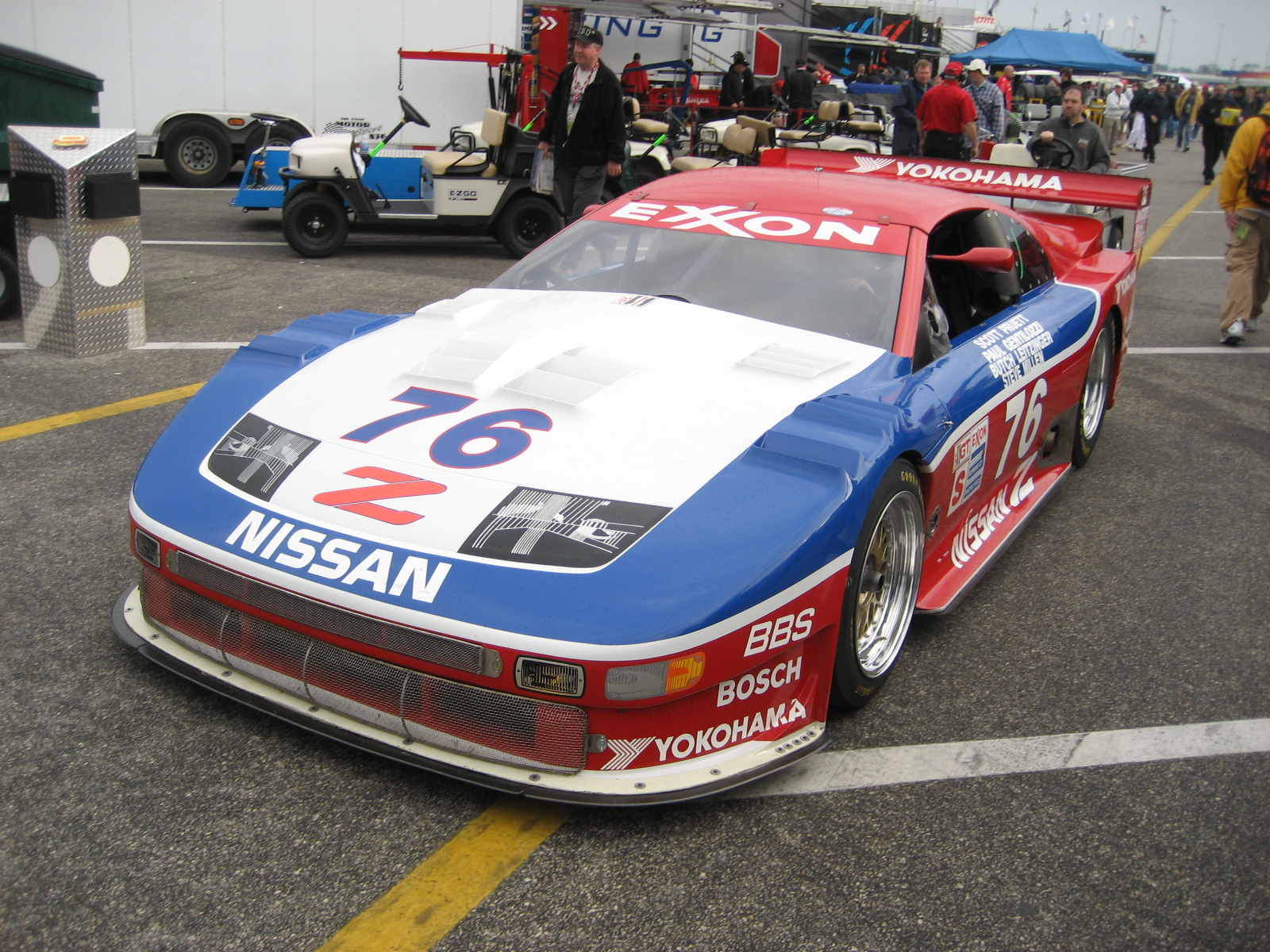
The Clayton Cunningham Racing 300ZX which won the 1994 24 Hours of Daytona

From 1990 to 1995, Steve Millen drove the twin turbo 300ZX for Clayton Cunningham Racing. The car dominated the IMSA in its GTO, then later GTS categories due to its newly designed chassis and engine. Millen would rank as the #1 Factory Driver for Nissan for 7 years and earn two IMSA GTS Driving Championships and two IMSA GTS Manufacturer's Championships. The biggest triumph for the Z32 racecar was the victory in the 1994 24 Hours of Daytona. In the 1994 24 Hours of Le Mans, the 300ZX ranked first in the GTS-1 class and 5th overall. In an attempt to level the playing field in the GTS-1 class by reducing the allowable horsepower, the IMSA declared the twin turbo VG engine ineligible for the 1995 season. The 1995 GTS 300ZX car would debut with the V8 Nissan VH engine at Daytona and would place first in the GTS-1 class at the 12 Hours of Sebring and Moosehead Grand Prix in Halifax.

The JUN-BLITZ Bonneville Z32 holds the E/BGMS class land speed record of 260.809 mph (419.73 km/h) set at the 1991 Bonneville Speed Trial. The vehicle was built as a partnership between JUN Auto and BLITZ. In 1990, JUN's first Z32 went 210.78 mph (339.22 km/h) at their Yatabe test course and hit 231.78 mph (373.01 km/h) after some tuning at Bonneville.

== Awards and recognition ==
300ZX lists and recognition
Year	Motor Trend	Road & Track	Car and Driver	Automobile
1990	"Import Car of the Year" "Top Ten Performance Cars"	"Ten Best Cars in the World"	10Best	"All Stars"
1991	—N/a		10Best	"All Stars"
1992	—N/a		10Best	"All Stars"
1993	—N/a		10Best	"All Stars"
1994	—N/a		10Best	"All Stars"
1995	—N/a		10Best	—N/a
1996	—N/a		10Best	—N/a

After the final year of U.S. sales (1996), the Z32 continued to win awards:

- 2004: Automobile lists the Z32 as one of the 100 coolest cars of all time
- 2006: Automobile lists the Z32 on both the "20 Greatest Cars of the Past 20 years" and the "25 Most Beautiful Cars in History"
- 2010: GQ Magazine lists the Z32 as one of the most stylish cars over the past 50 years

From the year it was introduced, the Z32 has also won many comparison tests against similar sports cars, including the Mitsubishi 3000GT/Dodge Stealth, Mazda RX-7, Chevrolet Corvette, Toyota Supra, Dodge Viper, Porsche 944 S2, and Porsche 968.

== Safety ==
In Australia, the 1990 to 1995 Nissan 300ZX was assessed in the Used Car Safety Ratings brochure as providing "average" protection for its occupants in the event of a crash.

In the US, the National Highway Traffic Safety Administration (NHTSA) gave the 1991-1993 300ZX 3 out of 5 stars in front driver collision crash test ratings.

== Trivia ==
Between 1999 and 2001, the Nissan 300ZX (Z32)'s headlights were also used under license on the Lamborghini Diablo, replacing its original pop-up lights.

== Notes ==
=== Bibliography ===
- Jackson, Terry (1992). Japanese Super Cars. London: Apple Press. pp. 6–11, 44–51. ISBN 1-85076-365-8.
