= T-top =

Automobile roof with removable panels

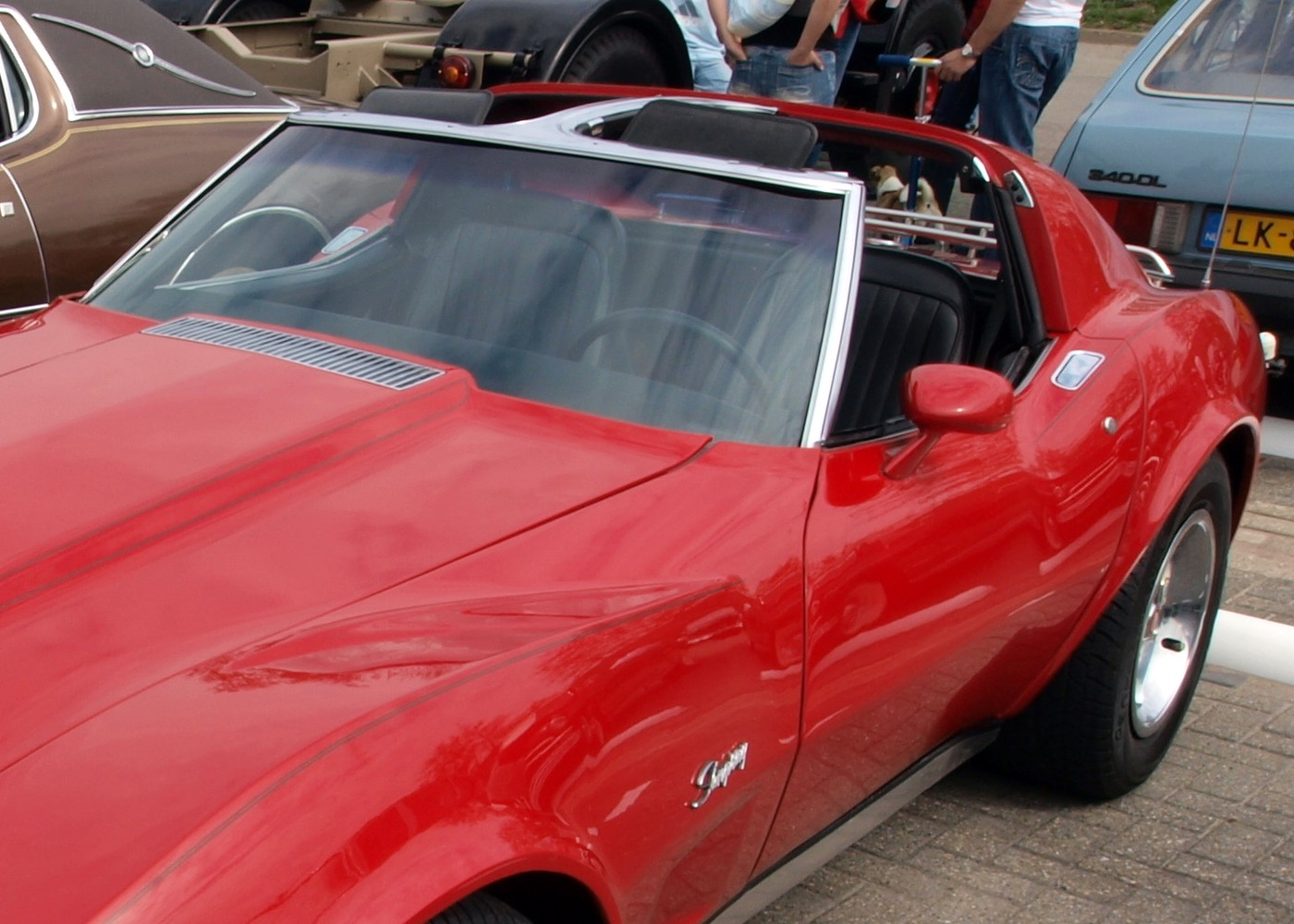
T-top on a Corvette Stingray

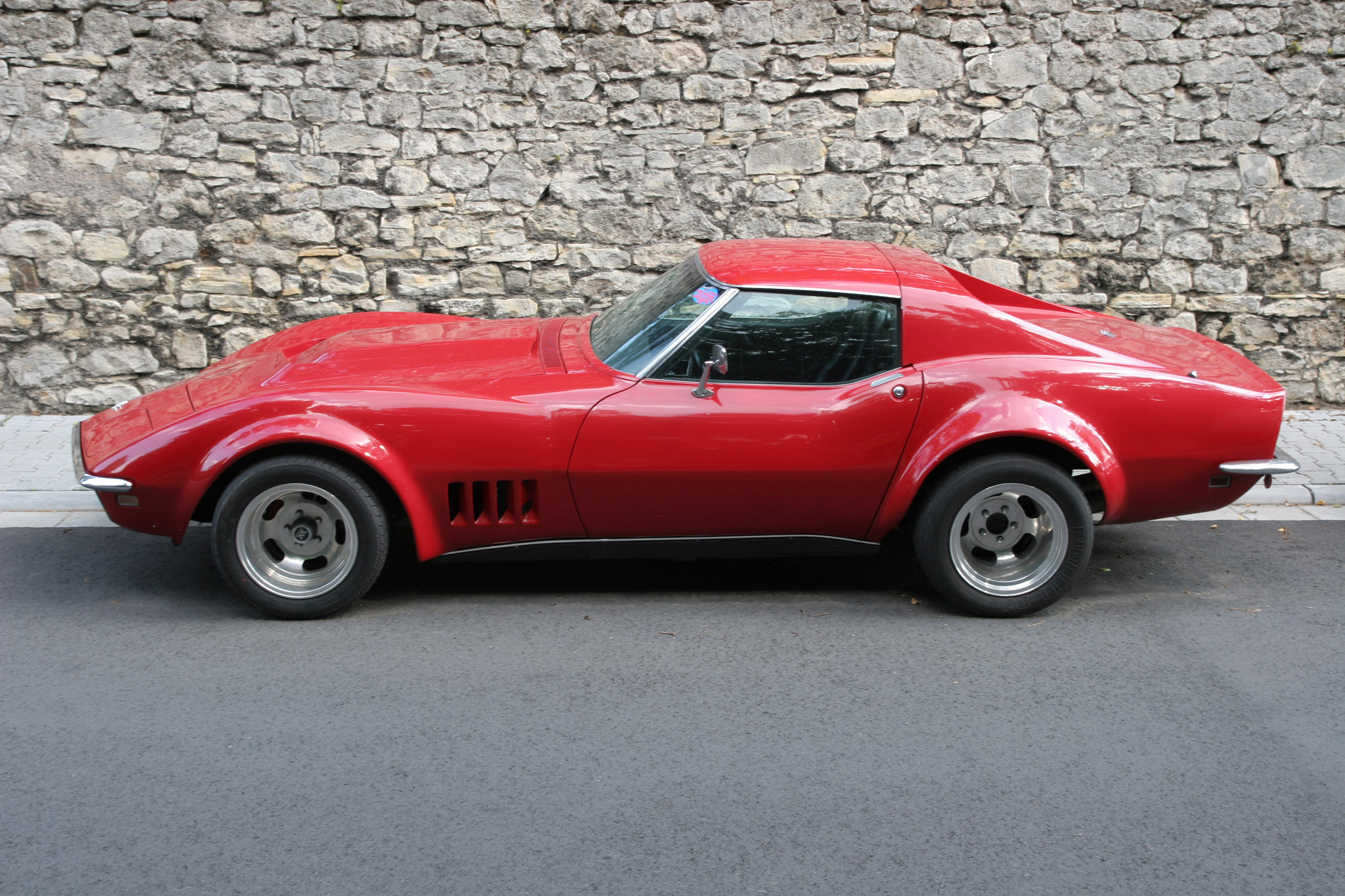
C3 Corvette with body-colored T‑top roof panels

A T-top (UK: T-bar) is an automobile roof with a removable panel on each side of a rigid bar running from the center of one structural bar between pillars to the center of the next structural bar. The panels of a traditional T-top are usually made of auto grade safety glass (tempered or laminated), or acrylic – but they can also be black or body-colored and made of other (often light-weight) materials.

The removable panel roof was patented by Gordon Buehrig on June 5, 1951. It was first used in a 1948 prototype by The American Sportscar Company or “Tasco.”

The 1968 Chevrolet Corvette coupe was the first U.S.-built production automobile to feature a T-top roof. This increased the popularity of the coupe, such that it outsold the convertible and later led to the discontinuation of the Corvette convertible after 1975 until it was revived in 1986. Post-C3 models were built with a targa top instead of a T-top.

== Examples of traditional T-Top ==
- Buick Regal (1976–1987)
- Chevrolet Corvette (1968–1982)
- Chevrolet Camaro (1978–2002)
- Chevrolet Monte Carlo (1978–1988)
- Chrysler Cordoba (1977–1982)
- Datsun 280ZX (1980+)
- Dodge Aspen/Plymouth Volaré Coupe (1977+)
- Dodge Charger (1977–1978)
- Dodge Daytona/Chrysler Laser (1986–1989)
- Dodge Magnum
- Dodge Mirada (1980–1982)
- Ford Mustang (1977–1978, 1981–1988)
- Ford Thunderbird T-Roof Convertible (1978.5–1979)
- GMC Hummer EV (2021-present)
- Mercury Capri (1981–1986)
- Nissan NX
- Nissan 300ZX
- Nissan EXA
- Nissan URGE (concept)
- Pontiac Fiero
- Pontiac Firebird, incl. Trans Am (1976+) and Formula 350 (1989–92)
- Pontiac Grand Prix (1977–1987)
- Rover 200 Coupe (1992–1999)
- Oldsmobile Cutlass Supreme (1976–1988)
- Suzuki X-90
- Subaru BRAT - Actually not a T-top. Just a separated twin sunroof.
- Toyota MR2 (AW11/SW20/SW21/SW22)

== T-Top variations ==
- Suzuki Cappuccino - has detachable roof panels which can be converted into a T-top
- Subaru Vivio - similar as above
- Triumph Stag - has the underlying T-Top structure, but has a one piece, non-glass, roof panel which passes over the central front-to-back bar when in place

== See also ==
- Cabrio coach
- Sunroof
- Targa top
