= 2001 Australian Sports Sedan Championship =

Motor racing competition

The 2001 Australian Sports Sedan Championship was an Australian motor racing competition for Group 3D Sports Sedans. It was sanctioned by the Confederation of Australian Motor Sport and was the seventeenth Australian Sports Sedan Championship.

The championship was won by Tony Ricciardello driving an Alfa Romeo GTV

== Calendar ==
The championship was contested over a five round series with two races per round.

Rd.	Circuit	Location / State	Date	Winner	Team
1	Phillip Island Grand Prix Circuit	Phillip Island, Victoria	24 & 25 March	Tony Ricciardello	Ricciardello Racing
2	Eastern Creek International Raceway	Sydney, New South Wales	28 & 29 April	Tony Ricciardello	Ricciardello Racing
3	Oran Park Motorsport Circuit	Sydney, New South Wales	28 & 29 July	Kerry Baily	Kerry Baily Motorsport
4	Queensland Raceway	Ipswich, Queensland	24 to 26 August	Kerry Baily	Kerry Baily Motorsport
5	Sandown International Motor Raceway	Melbourne, Victoria	30 November to 2 December	Tony Ricciardello	Ricciardello Racing

== Results ==
Position	Driver	No.	Car	Entrant	Phi	Eas	Ora	Que	San	Total
1	Tony Ricciardello	5	Alfa Romeo GTV Chevrolet	Ricciardello Racing	40	39	38	38	40	195
2	Kerry Baily	1	Nissan 300ZX Chevrolet	Kerry Baily Motorsport	20	21	41	41	19	142
3	Dean Randle	33	Saab 900 Aero Chevrolet; Saab 9-3 Aero Chevrolet	Dean Randle	31	22	12	18	34	117
4	Tony Wilson	27	Holden VS Commodore Chevrolet	The Smash Repair Centre	32	26	33	16	-	107
5	Ivan Mikac	42	Mazda RX-7	Mikac Motorsport	28	31	15	30	-	104
6	Stephen Voight	38	Honda Prelude Chevrolet	Roc Hydraulics	29	31	-	34	-	94
7	Mark Stinson	13	Holden Calibra Chevrolet	Mark Stinson	18	17	36	15	-	86
8	Jeff Barnes	6	Pontiac Firebird Trans Am Chevrolet	Jeff Barnes	-	37	28	-	-	65
9	Phil Crompton	49	Ford EB Falcon	The Crompton Group	16	-	-	31	15	62
10	Trent Young	41	Toyota Levin	Trent Young	7	11	18	15	-	51
11	Daniel Jameson	45	Jaguar XKR Chevrolet	Barry Jameson	-	-	30	-	17	47
12	Mark Duggan	11	Holden Calibra Chevrolet	Duggan Family Racing	11	14	-	-	-	25
13	Robert Smith	72	Holden VS Commodore	Smiths Trucks Pty Ltd	-	-	-	-	22	22
14	Terry Shiel	111	Mazda RX-7 S6	John William Keen	-	18	-	-	-	18
15	Darren Hossack	4	Saab 9-3 Chevrolet	John Gourlay	-	-	-	-	9	9
