= 1998 Australian Sports Sedan Championship =

Motor racing competition

The 1998 Australian Sports Sedan Championship was an Australian motor racing competition for Group 2D Sports Sedans. It was sanctioned by the Confederation of Australian Motor Sport and was the 14th Australian Sports Sedan Championship to be awarded by CAMS.

The championship was won by Tony Ricciardello driving an Alfa Romeo Alfetta GTV Chevrolet.

== Championship schedule ==
The championship was contested over five rounds.

Round	Circuit	State	Date	Format	Round winner
1	Oran Park	New South Wales	5 April	Three races	Kerry Baily
2	Oran Park	New South Wales	14 June	Three races	Tony Ricciardello
3	Oran Park	New South Wales	2 August	Three races	Tony Ricciardello
4	Mallala	South Australia	23 August	Three races	Tony Ricciardello
5	Oran Park	New South Wales	1 November	Three races	Tony Ricciardello

== Points system ==
Championship points were awarded on a 10–9–8–7–6–5–4–3–2–1 basis for the first ten positions attained in qualifying at each round . No points were awarded for Race 1, however the results were used to determine the starting grid for Race 2. Championship points were awarded on a 21–19–17–16–15–14–13–12–11–10 basis for the first ten positions in both Race 2 and Race 3 of each round.

== Results ==
Position	Driver	No.	Car	Entrant	Total
1	Tony Ricciardello	15	Alfa Romeo Alfetta GTV Chevrolet	Basil Ricciardello	244
2	Mick Monterosso	2	Ford Escort RS2000 Chevrolet	Mick Monterosso	207
3	Kerry Baily	1	Toyota Celica Supra Chevrolet	K Baily	197
4	Mark Stinson	13	Holden Calibra	Australian Sports Sedan Association	173
5	Des Wall	20	Toyota Supra Chevrolet	Des Wall	121
6	Ivan Mikac	42	Mazda RX-7	Ivan Mikac	71
7	Stephen Lichtenberger	5	Mazda RX-7 Chevrolet	Australian Sports Sedan Association	62
8	Bob Jolly	3	Holden VS Commodore	Bob Jolly	58
9	Joseph Said	9	Fiat 124 Coupe		53
10	Graham Smith	16	Opel Calibra	Australian Sports Sedan Association	52
11	Stephen Voight	38	Honda Prelude	Stephen Voight	51
12	Keith Carling	11	Mazda RX-7 Nissan	JW Keen	47
13	Peter O'Brien	17	Holden VL Commodore	O'Brien Aluminium	43
14	Barry Jameson	45	Ford EF Falcon XR8	Barry Jameson	40
15	Tony Wilson	27	Holden VS Commodore	The Smash Repair Centre	39
16	James Phillip	55	Honda Prelude		34
17	Charlie Senese	12	Ford EF Falcon	Carmine Senese	32
18	Glen Taylor	19	Holden VN Commodore		27
19	Phil Crompton	49	Ford EB Falcon		25
20	Fred Axisa	80	Holden VK Commodore		25
21	Jeff Barnes	6	Pontiac Firebird Trans Am		22
22	Barry Morcom	7	Ford Falcon		18
23	Bill Martin	10	Mazda RX-7	Bill Martin	14
24	Frank Sola	78	Ford TE Cortina		13
25	Kevin Clark	116	Ford Mustang	Kevin Clark	12
26	Lance Hughes	22	Holden VL Commodore		11
27	Dean Randle	32	Saab 900 Aero	Dean Randle	10
28	Mike Imrie	4	Holden VS Commodore		10
29	Darren Pearce	83	Fiat 124		10
