= 2007 Kerrick Sports Sedan Series =

Australian motor racing series

The 2007 Kerrick Sports Sedan Series was an Australian motor racing series which was recognised by the Confederation of Australian Motor Sport as a National Series. It was the seventeenth running of a national series for Sports Sedans in Australia. It began on 22 April 2007 at Oran Park Raceway and ended on 9 December at Sandown Raceway after fifteen races.

The series was won by Tony Ricciardello driving an Alfa Romeo Alfetta GTV.

== Teams and drivers ==
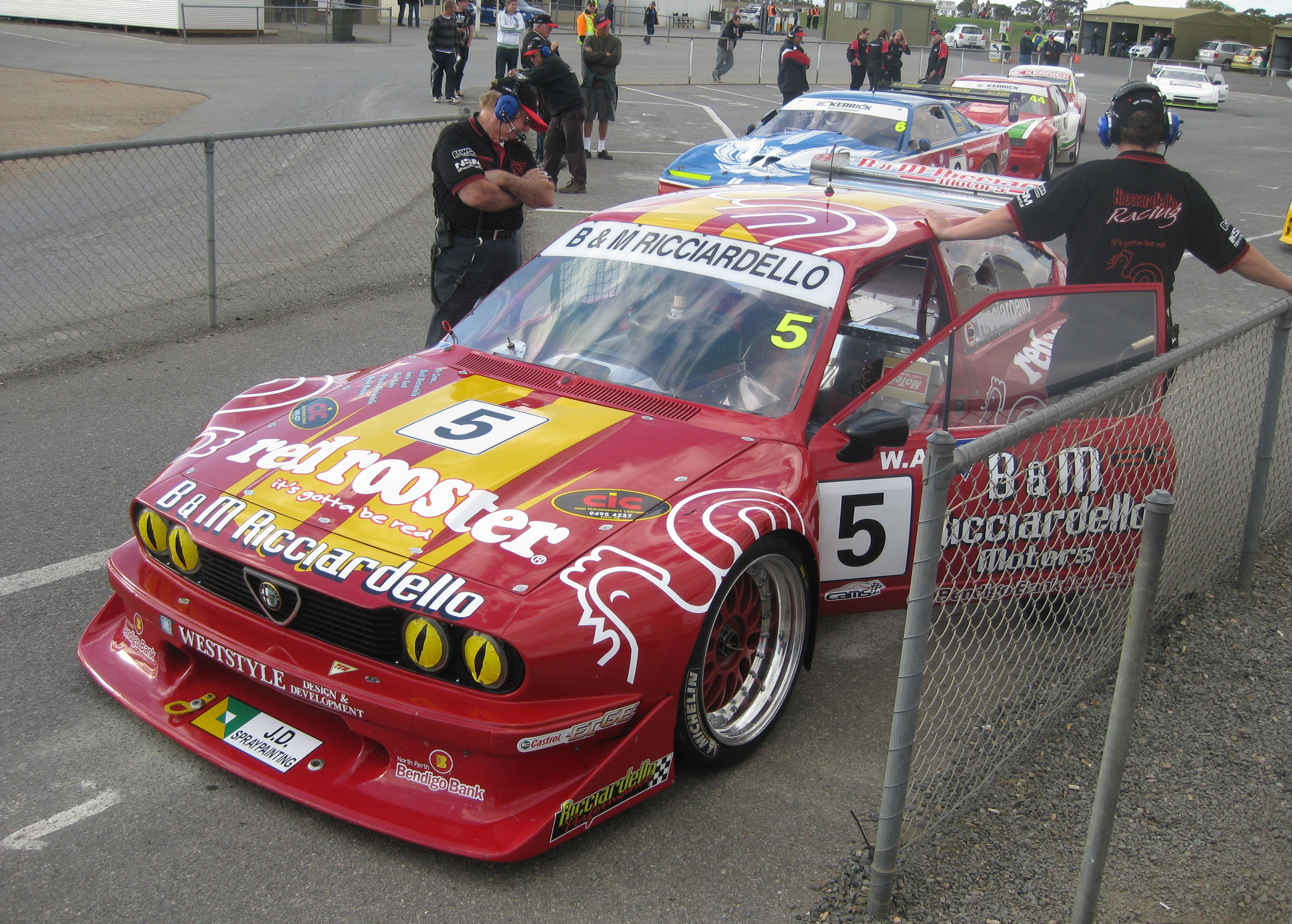
Tony Ricciardello won the series driving an Alfa Romeo Alfetta GTV. The car is pictured in 2011.

The following drivers competed in the 2007 Kerrick Sports Sedan Series.

Entrant	Car	No	Driver
Kerrick	Saab 9-3 Aero	1	Dean Randle
Hercules Engineering Mack Trucks	Nissan 300ZX	2	Stephen Voight
Audi Spares	Audi A4	4	Darren Hossack
B&M Ricciardello	Alfa Romeo Alfetta GTV	5	Tony Ricciardello
Roddy Jag Service	Jaguar XJS	6	Mike Roddy
B&V Auto Techniques	Ford Escort MkII	7	Mick Monterosso
Domain Prestige Homes	Holden Calibra	9	Daniel Tamasi
P&L Mechanical Services	Mazda RX-7	9	Graeme Gilliland
Roddy Jag Service	Jaguar XJS	12	Jordan Roddy
Interleasing	Saab 9-3 Aero	14	Mark Nelson
QLD Commercial Constructions	Honda Prelude	15	Charlie Senese
Speedy Fasteners	Opel Calibra	16	Graham Smith
Marinelli's Mechanical & Performance	Ford Anglia 105E	17	Luke Marinelli
Kings Fibreglass/Harrop Engineering	Holden LJ Torana	19	Damian Johnson
RDS-Wall Racing	Chevrolet Corvette C6	20	Des Wall
Datafin	Ford Mustang	21	Phil Crompton
Airey Industrial	Nissan 300ZX	28	Kerry Baily
National Metal Recyclers	Chevrolet Camaro	30	Geoff Munday
RK&T Young Plumbing	Mazda RX-7	41	Trent Young
Aston Air Conditioning	Ford EB Falcon	43	Shane Bradford
MR Automotive	Rover Vitesse	44	Colin Smith
Campbelltown Frames & Trusses	Jaguar XKR	45	Daniel Jameson
Coaststeer Auto Services	Holden Calibra	46	David McGinniss
Executive Heating & Cooling	Mazda RX-7	48	Luke Chambers
CSJ Engineering/Steves Toy Shop	Holden Calibra	50	Chris Jackson
Marinelli's Mechanical & Performance	Holden VS Commodore	51	Bob McLoughlin
Fivestar Fencing	Honda Prelude	56	Dean Camm
Quality Concreting	Mazda RX-7	59	Bobby Irvin
Austrack Motorsport	Holden VX Commodore	80	Fred Axisa
AGM Engineering	Rover Vitesse	91	Anthony Macready
Whiteline Transport	Chevrolet Camaro	95	Chris Templar

== Race calendar ==
The 2007 Kerrick Sports Sedan Series was contested over five rounds. The series comprised fifteen races, at five race meetings, held in four different states.

Rd.	Circuit	Location / state	Date	Winner
1	Oran Park Raceway	Sydney, New South Wales	20–22 Apr	Tony Ricciardello
2	Queensland Raceway	Ipswich, Queensland	25–27 May	Tony Ricciardello
3	Eastern Creek Raceway	Sydney, New South Wales	13–15 Jul	Tony Ricciardello
4	Mallala Motor Sport Park	Mallala, South Australia	12–14 Oct	Tony Ricciardello
5	Sandown Raceway	Melbourne, Victoria	7–9 Dec	Tony Ricciardello

== Points system ==
Points were awarded 20-17-15-13-12-11-10-9-8-7-6-5-4-3-2 based on the top fifteen race positions in each race. All other classified finishers will be awarded one point. Two points were awarded for first place in Qualifying.

== Series standings ==
Pos	Driver	Round 1 - Ora			Round 2 - Que			Round 3 - Eas			Round 4 - Mal			Round 5 - San			Pts
Pos	Driver	Race 1*	Race 2	Race 3	Race 1	Race 2	Race 3	Race 1	Race 2	Race 3**	Race 1	Race 2	Race 3	Race 1	Race 2	Race 3	Pts
1	Tony Ricciardello		1st	1st	1st	1st	1st	1st	1st		2nd	1st	1st	2nd	3rd	1st	259
2	Stephen Voight		3rd	3rd	2nd	2nd	2nd	5th	3rd		11th	7th	6th	3rd	9th	6th	170
3	Kerry Baily		Ret	Ret	3rd	4th	4th	2nd	Ret		1st	2nd	2nd	5th	2nd	2nd	158
4	Dean Randle		2nd	2nd	11th	3rd	Ret	4th	2nd		6th	3rd	4th	Ret	DNS	DNS	124
5	Bobby Ervin				4th	6th	3rd	3rd	4th		13th	8th	7th	8th	4th	Ret	112
6	Charlie Senese		8th	6th	6th	7th	Ret	9th	8th		18th	Ret	DNS	12th	8th	7th	82
7	Phil Crompton				DNS	Ret	7th	10th	Ret		3rd	6th	Ret	7th	5th	3rd	80
8	Fred Axisa		6th	5th	8th	Ret	7th	8th	Ret		12th	Ret	DNS	Ret	DNS	6th	67
9	Daniel Jameson		Ret	4th				Ret	Ret		4th	4th	Ret	6th	Ret	4th	63
10	Trent Young				Ret	Ret	6th	6th	Ret		Ret	5th	5th				46
11	Colin Smith		5th	Ret	10th	9th	Ret	10th	7th								43
12	Daniel Tamasi							DNS	DNS					1st	1st	Ret	40
13	Chris Templar										9th	9th	Ret	4th	6th	DNS	40
14	Mike Roddy							13th	5th					Ret	7th	9th	34
15	Dean Camm							Ret	6th		10th	10th	Ret	9th	Ret	Ret	33
16	David McGinniss		Ret	DNS							15th	12th	9th	10th	Ret	8th	31
17	Graham Smith		9th	DNS	Ret	Ret	Ret	Ret	DNS		7th	16th	8th	DNS	DNS	DNS	28
18	Shane Bradford				7th	8th	9th										27
19	Darren Hossack										8th	Ret	3rd				24
20	Bob McLoughlin		DNS	DNS	9th	10th	8th										24
21	Mark Nelson		DNS	Ret				5th	Ret		14th	11th	10th	DNS	DNS	DNS	21
22	Anthony Macready		7th	Ret				10th	DNS								17
23	Chris Jackson		4th	Ret				DNS	DNS								13
24	Mick Monterosso										5th	Ret	DNS				12
25	Damian Johnson										17th	14th	11th				9
26	Graeme Gilliland										16th	15th	12th				8
27	Jordan Roddy		DNS	DNS	Ret	11th	DNS										6
27	Geoff Munday													11th	Ret	DNS	6
29	Luke Chambers										DNS	13th	Ret				4
	Luke Marinelli		Ret	DNS													
	Des Wall		DNS	DNS													

Colour	Result
Gold	Winner
Silver	Second place
Bronze	Third place
Green	Points classification
Blue	Non-points classification
Blue	Non-classified finish (NC)
Purple	Retired, not classified (Ret)
Red	Did not qualify (DNQ)
Red	Did not pre-qualify (DNPQ)
Black	Disqualified (DSQ)
White	Did not start (DNS)
White	Withdrew (WD)
White	Race cancelled (C)
Blank	Did not practice (DNP)
Blank	Did not arrive (DNA)
Blank	Excluded (EX)

* No points were scored after the race was declared with insufficient laps completed after a crash by Jordan Roddy caused the race to be red flagged.
** Race was cancelled after race schedule overran.
