= 2005 Tranzam Sports Sedan Series =

Motor racing competition

The 2005 Tranzam Sports Sedan Series was a national motor racing series sanctioned by the Confederation of Australian Motor Sport and open to drivers of:

- Sports Sedans complying with CAMS Group 3D regulations
- Transam cars complying with National Australian Sports Sedan Association regulations
- TraNZam cars complying with TRG of New Zealand regulations
- Australian Tranzam cars complying with National Australian Sports Sedan Association regulations

The series was contested over a five round series.

- Round 1, Phillip Island, Victoria, 22 May
- Round 2, Queensland Raceway, Queensland, 3 July
- Round 3, Eastern Creek Raceway, New South Wales, 24 July
- Round 4, Oran Park Raceway, Sydney, New South Wales, 18 September
- Round 5, Wakefield Park, New South Wales, 13 November

== Results ==
Position	Driver	No.	Car	Points
1	Tony Ricciardello	5	Alfa Romeo Alfetta GTV - Chevrolet	303
2	Kerry Baily	28	Nissan 300ZX - Chevrolet	195
3	Darren Hossack	1	Saab 9-3 Aero - Chevrolet	166
4	Dean Randle	93	Saab 9-3 Aero - Chevrolet	163
5	Des Wall	20	Chevrolet Corvette	151
6	Phil Crompton	21	Ford Mustang	106
