= 2006 Kerrick Sports Sedan Series =

Australian motor racing competition

The 2006 Kerrick Sports Sedan Series was an Australian motor racing competition which was recognised by Confederation of Australian Motor Sport (CAMS) as a National Series. It was the third National Series for Sports Sedans to be contested in Australia following the discontinuation of the Australian Sports Sedan Championship at the end of 2003 and was the first to carry the "Kerrick Sports Sedan Series" name.

The following cars were eligible to compete in the series:

- Class SS: Cars complying with CAMS regulations for Group 3D Sports Sedans
- Class TS: Trans Am Cars complying with Australian regulations for North American Trans-Am competition
- Class TNZ: TraNZam cars complying with TRG of New Zealand regulations
- Class TA: Australian Transzam cars complying with class TA regulations

The series was won by Dean Randle driving a Saab 9-3 Aero.

== Calendar ==
The series was contested over five rounds.

Round	Circuit	Date	Format	Round winner	Car
1	Wakefield Park	3–5 March	Two races	Tony Ricciardello	Alfa Romeo GTV
2	Phillip Island	19–21 May	Two races	Dean Randle	Saab 9-3 Aero
3	Eastern Creek	7–9 July	Three races	Tony Ricciardello	Alfa Romeo GTV
4	Queensland Raceway	2–3 September	Three races	Dean Randle	Saab 9-3 Aero
5	Oran Park	28–29 October	Three races	Tony Ricciardello	Alfa Romeo GTV

== Points system ==
Series points were awarded in each race as per the following table:

Position	1st	2nd	3rd	4th	5th	6th	7th	8th	9th	10th	11th	12th	13th	14th	15th	Other finishers
Points	20	18	15	13	12	11	10	9	8	7	6	5	4	3	2	1

In addition, 2 points were awarded for first place in the qualifying classification.

== Series standings ==
Position	Driver	Car	Points
1	Dean Randle	Saab 9-3 Aero Chevrolet	227
2	Tony Ricciardello	Alfa Romeo Alfetta GTV Chevrolet	195
3	Daniel Tamasi	Holden Calibra Chevrolet	168
4	Stephen Voight	Nissan 300ZX Chevrolet	110
5	Glen Hastings	Ford TC Cortina Chevrolet	97
6	Charlie Senese	Honda Prelude Chevrolet	89
7	Kerry Baily	Nissan 300ZX Chevrolet	84
8	Des Wall	Chevrolet Corvette	77
9	Phil Crompton	Ford Mustang	72
10	Jeff Barnes	Pontiac Firebird Trans Am	51
11	Darren Hossack	Saab 9-3 Aero Chevrolet	45
12	Trent Young	Mazda RX-7	39
13	Daniel Jamieson	Jaguar XKR Chevrolet	39
14	Chris Jackson	Holden Calibra Chevrolet	34
15	Colin Smith	Rover Vitesse Chevrolet	32
16	Chris Donnelly	Ford EB Falcon	30
17	Bob McLoughlin	Holden VS Commodore Chevrolet	29
18	Mark Nelson	Saab 9-3 Aero Chevrolet	22
19	Geoff Gillespie	BMW E36 M3	15
20	Stephen Lichtenberger	Mazda RX-7	13
21	Shane Bradford	Ford EB Falcon	13
22	Dean Camm	Honda Prelude Chevrolet	11
23	Fred Axisa	Holden VX Commodore Chevrolet	11
24	Anthony Macready	Rover Vitesse Chevrolet	9
25	Graham Smith	Opel Calibra Ford V6 Turbo	7
26	Bill Martin	Mazda RX-7	0
