= 2011 Australian Sports Sedan season =

Motor racing competition

The 2011 Australian Sports Sedan season was the 27th season of Australian Sports Sedan motor racing in which a national championship or national series has been contested. The season featured the 2011 Kerrick Sports Sedan Series, which began on 14 May 2011 at Mallala Motor Sport Park and ended on 6 November at Phillip Island Grand Prix Circuit after fifteen races. The series was televised on SBS program SBS Speedweek.

After winning four rounds and ten races in the 2011 Series, Western Australian Alfa Romeo GTV driver Tony Ricciardello took his seventh Sports Sedan series victory, expanding his own record. Ricciardello won by 112 points from Queensland Chevrolet Camaro driver Shane Bradford.

== Eligible vehicles ==
Automobiles that complied with the provisions of any one of the following groups were eligible to compete in the Series:

- SS: Group 3D Sports Sedans regulations as published by the Confederation of Australian Motor Sport
- TA: 2011 SCCA Pro Racing Regulations Article 4 for Trans-am
- TNZ: Schedule TZ regulations published by MotorSport New Zealand

== Teams and drivers ==
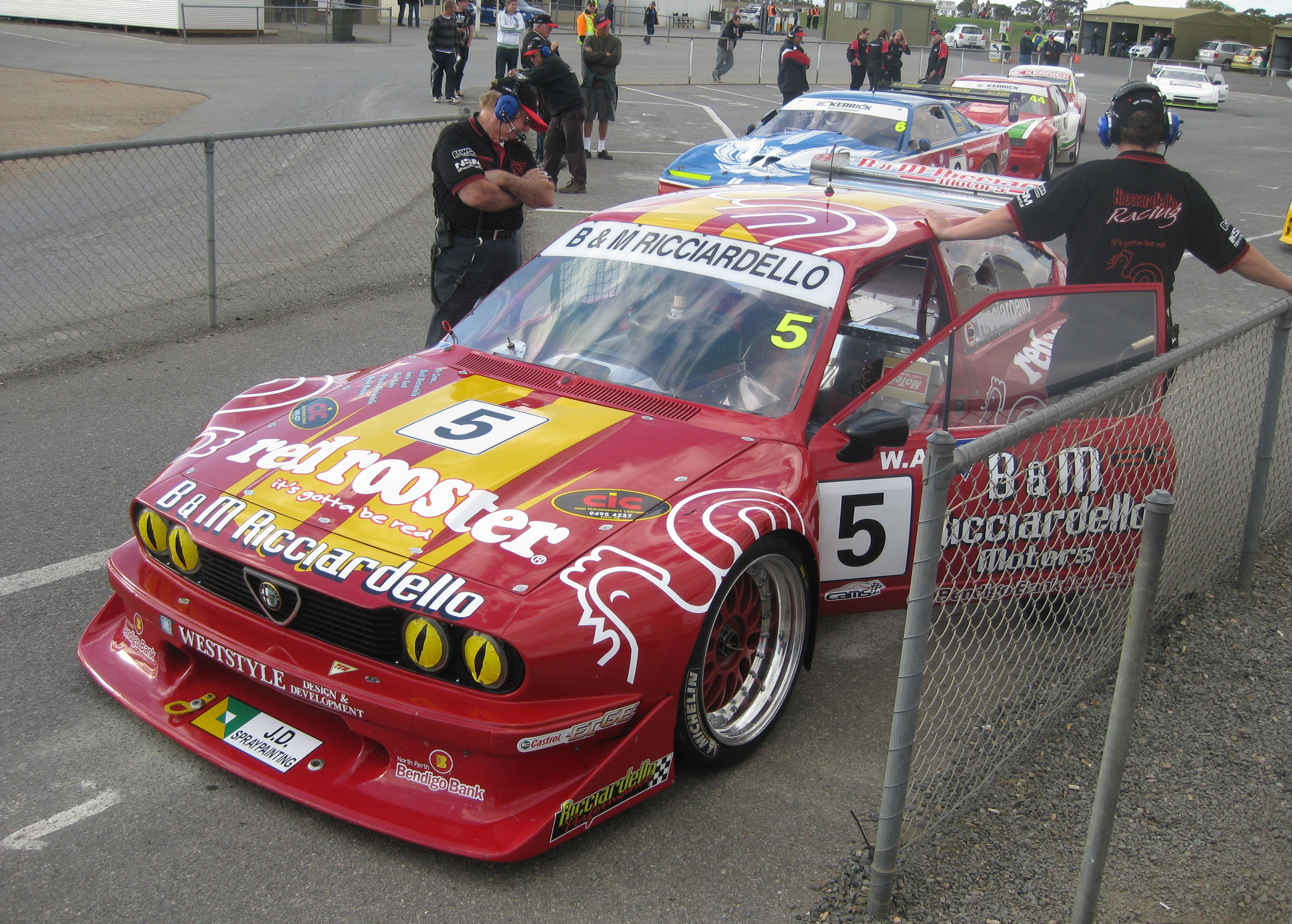
Tony Ricciardello (Alfa Romeo GTV) won the 2011 Kerrick Sports Sedan Series

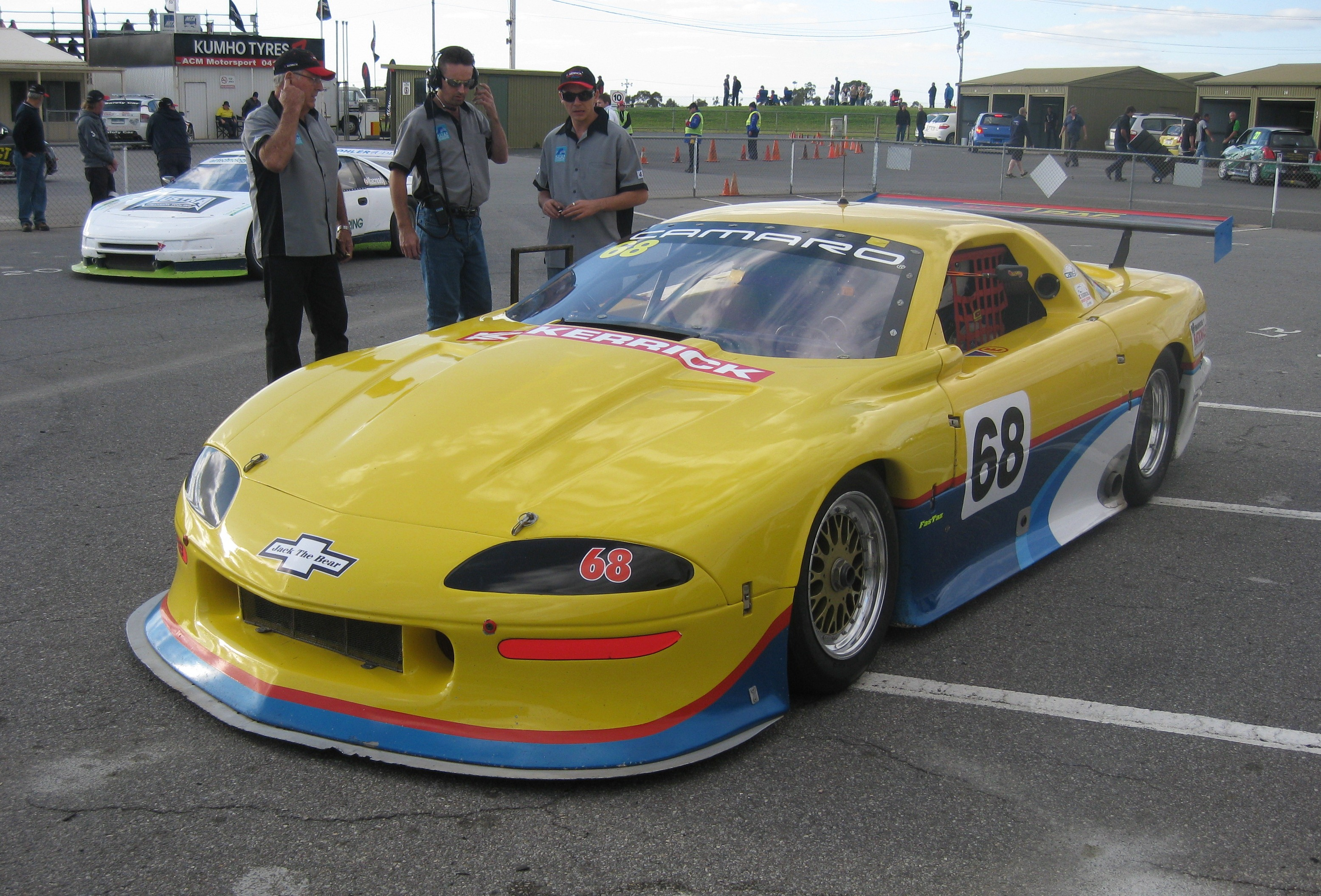
Shane Bradford (Chevrolet Camaro) placed second in the series

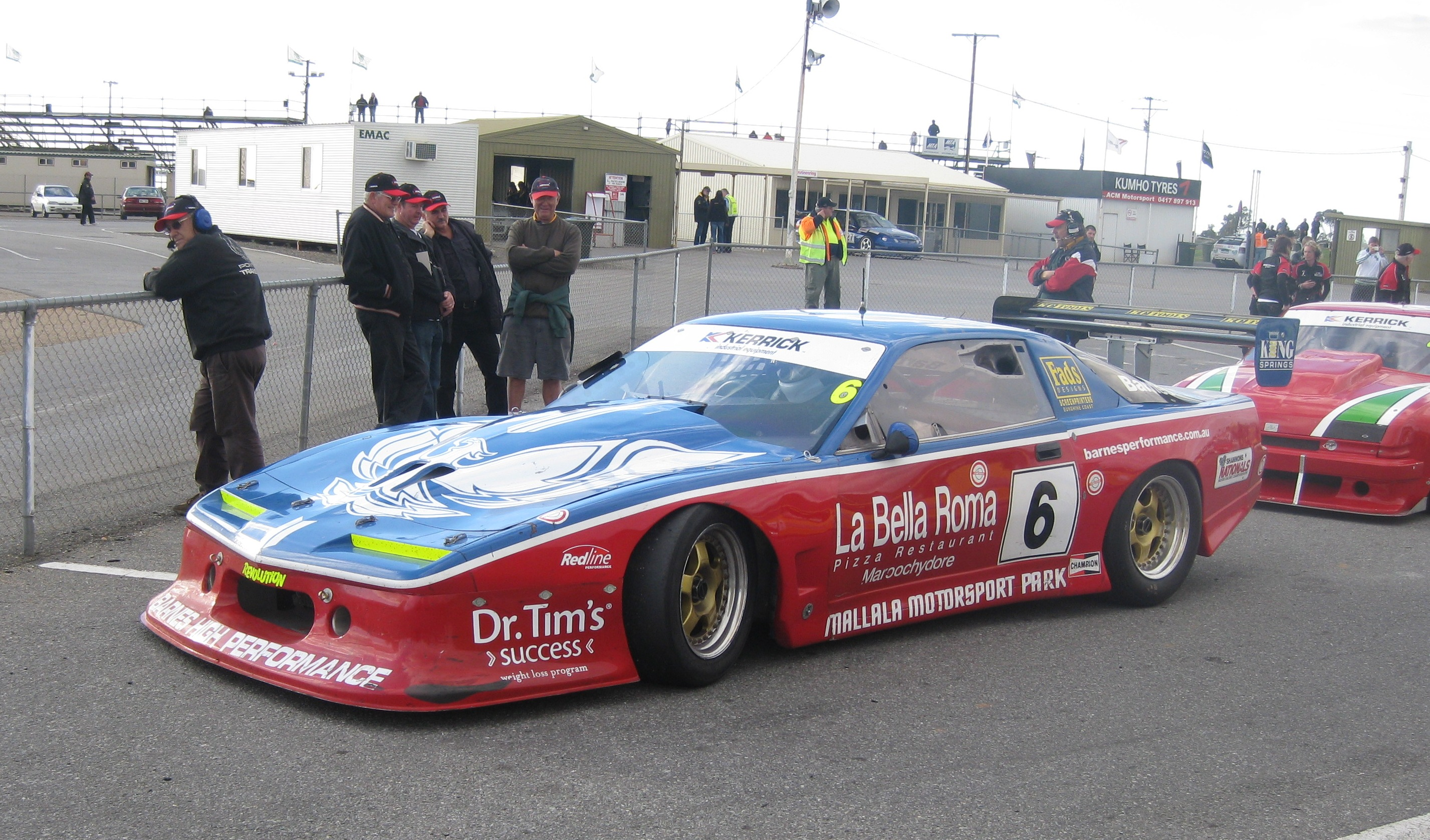
Jeff Barnes (Pontiac Firebird) placed 19th in the series

The following drivers competed in the 2011 Kerrick Sports Sedan Series.

Team	Car	No	Driver
Fuel 2 Race	Opel Calibra	1	Chris Jackson
Auto Union Deutsche	Audi A4	4	Darren Hossack
B&M Ricciardello Motors	Alfa Romeo GTV	5	Tony Ricciardello
Barnes High Performance	Pontiac Firebird	6	Jeff Barnes
Menai Blinds	Chevrolet Camaro	7	Scott Butler
Centreline Suspension	Mazda RX-7	9	Chris Muscat
Unitex Architectural Products	Opel Calibra	9	Daniel Tamasi
Industrie Clothing	Holden VZ Commodore	11	Simon Copping
Pakenham Tyrepower	Holden VN Commodore	12	Chas Talbot
Stuart Inwood	Ford AU Falcon	12	Stuart Inwood
Rosemount Smash Repairs	Saab 9-3 Aero	14	Anthony Cox
Rocklea Motors	Opel Calibra	16	Graham Smith
Johnson Motorsport	Holden LJ Torana GTR XU-1	19	Damien Johnson
P&L Mechanical	Mazda RX-7	21	Graeme Gilliland
Glenn Pro	Ford Escort MkII	21	Glenn Pro
Reds Racing Services	Holden VL Commodore	23	Geoff Whittaker
Jocaro Motors	Ford Mustang	25	Neil Bryson
Bell Real Estate	Holden Monaro	32	Michael Robinson
Sinoco LED Lighting	Holden VK Commodore	35	Grant Doulman
Aston Air Conditioning	Ford EB Falcon	43	Chris Donnelly
MR Automotive	Rover Vitesse	44	Colin Smith
Campbelltown Frames & Trusses	Jaguar XKR	45	Daniel Jameson
Coaststeer Automotive	Opel Calibra	46	David McGinniss
Interstate Finance & Leasing	Holden VK Commodore	46	Mark Bowen
Pipeline Plumbing	Chevrolet Camaro	49	Dave Pettit
Marinelli's Mechanical & Performance	Holden VS Commodore	51	Bob McLoughlin
Aston's Pharmacy	Holden VC Commodore	55	Chris Aston
BJ Banks Electrical	Mazda RX-7	56	Bruce Banks
FM Pumps	Mazda RX-7	57	Frank Mascadri
Holton Spares	Holden VZ Commodore	59	Jake Williams
Fivestar Fencing & Gates	Chevrolet Corvette GTS	66	Dean Camm
Aston Air Conditioning	Chevrolet Camaro	68	Shane Bradford
Dandy Engines	Ford Cortina	70	Keith Linnell
Ramsdale Wreckers	Holden LC Torana GTR XU-1	73	Garry Roberts
Ramsdale Wreckers	Holden LC Torana GTR XU-1	73	Lauren Gray
Dance Expressions	Fiat 131	76	Nick Smith
Austrack Motorsport	Holden VX Commodore	80	Alfred Axisa
Esjay Commercial Plastering	Holden VS Commodore	88	Ian Rice
Glenn White	Ford Capri MkI	93	Glenn White
Swedish Prestige	Saab 9-3 Aero	93	Dean Randle
Rosemount Smash Repairs	Holden Gemini	95	Anthony Cox
Bohler Uddeholm Australia	Nissan 300ZX	97	Anthony Macready
Wildridge Fabrications	Ford EF Falcon	98	Jeff Brown

== Race calendar ==
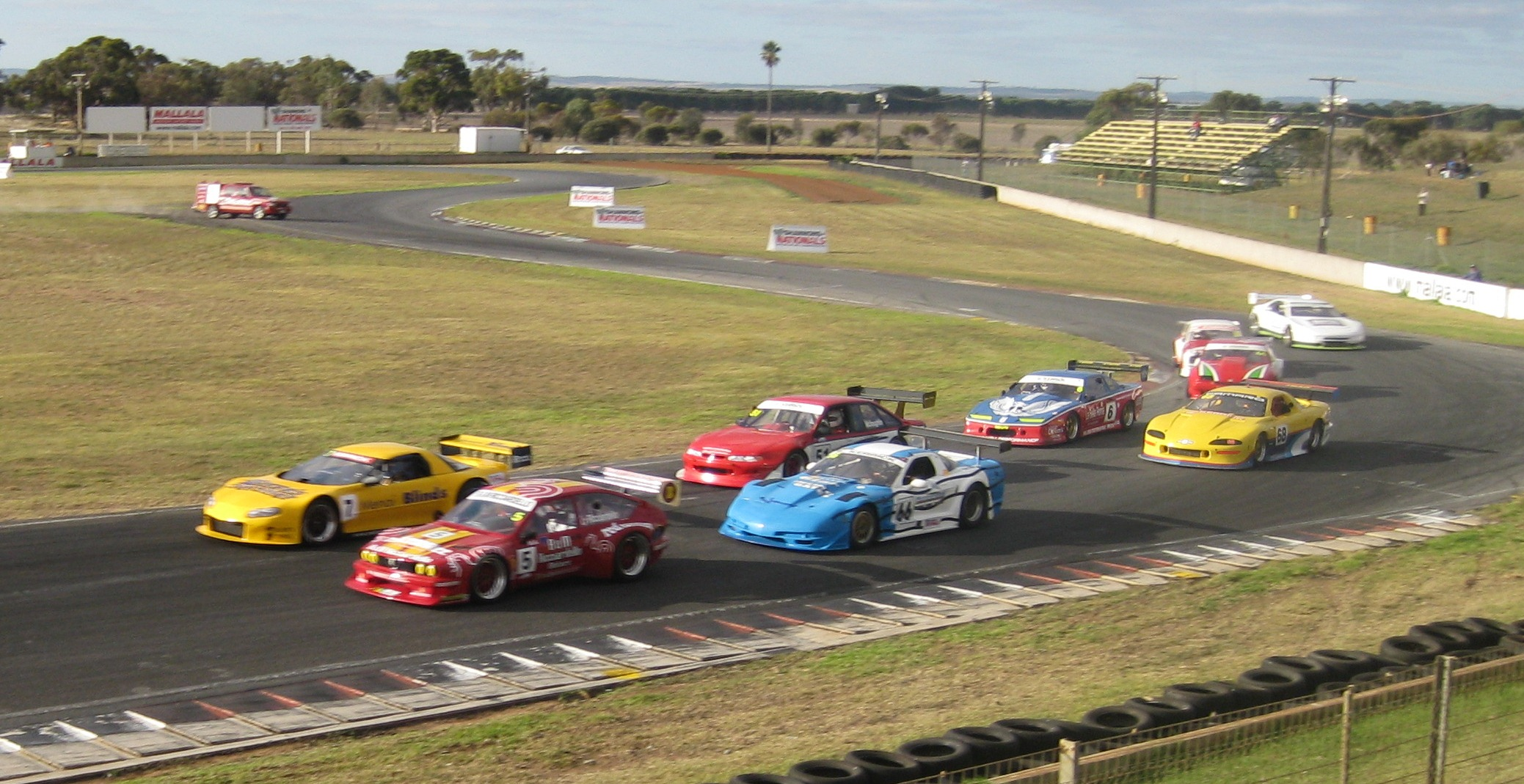
The rolling start for Race 3 of Round 1 at Mallala Motor Sport Park

The 2011 Kerrick Sports Sedan Series was contested over five rounds, each of which was held at Shannons Nationals Motor Racing Championships rounds.

Rd.	Circuit	Location / state	Date	Winner
1	(South Australia) Mallala Motor Sport Park	Adelaide, South Australia	14–15 May	Tony Ricciardello
2	(Victoria (state)) Winton Motor Raceway	Benalla, Victoria	25–26 June	Tony Ricciardello
3	(New South Wales) Eastern Creek Raceway	Sydney, New South Wales	16–17 July	Tony Ricciardello
4	(Queensland) Morgan Park Raceway	Warwick, Queensland	13–14 August	Tony Ricciardello
5	(Victoria (state)) Phillip Island Grand Prix Circuit	Phillip Island, Victoria	5–6 November	Darren Hossack

== Point system ==
Points were awarded 20–17–15–13–12–11–10–9–8–7–6–5–4–3–2 based on the top fifteen race positions in each race, with each other race finisher receiving 1 point. There were two bonus points allocated for pole position. Pole position is indicated in bold text.

== Series standings ==
Pos	Driver	Car	Round 1 – Mal			Round 2 – Win			Round 3 – Eas			Round 4 – Mor			Round 5 – Phi			Pts
Pos	Driver	Car	Race 1	Race 2	Race 3	Race 1	Race 2	Race 3	Race 1	Race 2	Race 3	Race 1	Race 2	Race 3	Race 1	Race 2	Race 3	Pts
1	Tony Ricciardello	Alfa Romeo GTV	**1st**	1st	3rd	**1st**	1st	1st	**1st**	1st	2nd	**1st**	1st	1st	**2nd**	2nd	2nd	293
2	Shane Bradford	Chevrolet Camaro	4th	5th	9th	7th	6th	4th	8th	10th	7th	2nd	3rd	2nd	5th	3rd	5th	181
3	Dean Camm	Chevrolet Corvette	5th	3rd	5th	5th	5th	6th	11th	6th	Ret	Ret	6th	4th	4th	4th	4th	154
4	Darren Hossack	Audi A4				2nd	2nd	Ret	2nd	2nd	1st				1st	1st	1st	148
5	Scott Butler	Chevrolet Camaro	2nd	2nd	1st	16th	3rd	2nd	Ret	Ret	Ret	4th	Ret	Ret				100
6	Colin Smith	Rover Vitesse	Ret	8th	6th	9th	Ret	9th	14th	13th	14th	6th	5th	6th				79
7	Bruce Banks	Mazda RX-7	Ret	7th	DNS	13th	12th	11th	15th	14th	10th	8th	Ret	Ret	8th	5th	6th	78
8	Bob McLoughlin	Holden Commodore VS	3rd	4th	9th	11th	9th	8th				3rd	Ret	DNS				74
9	Chris Donnelly	Ford Falcon EB										7th	2nd	3rd	7th	8th	7th	71
10	Damien Johnson	Holden Torana	7th	9th	7th	14th	13th	12th	16th	16th	12th	Ret	DNS	DNS	10th	9th	8th	70
11	Anthony Macready	Nissan 300ZX	6th	Ret	5th	4th	16th	7th	10th	Ret	Ret							53
12	Michael Robinson	Holden Monaro				8th	7th	5th							6th	7th	Ret	52
13	Chris Muscat	Mazda RX-7				3rd	4th	3rd										43
14	Daniel Tamasi	Holden Calibra							7th	3rd	3rd							40
15	Geoff Whittaker	Holden Commodore							4th	4th	5th							38
16	Mark Bowen	Holden Commodore										5th	4th	5th				37
17	Dameon Jameson	Jaguar XKR							3rd	11th	4th							34
18	Dean Randle	Saab													3rd	Ret	3rd	30
19	Jeff Barnes	Pontiac	DNS	6th	2nd													28
19	Frank Mascadri	Mazda RX-7										9th	7th	7th				28
21	Simon Copping	Holden Commodore							9th	9th	6th							27
22	Tony Cox	Holden Gemini & Saab										11th	DNS	DNS	9th	6th	Ret	25
23	Ian Rice	Holden Commodore				6th	8th	13th										24
24	David McGinniss	Holden Calibra							6th	7th	Ret							21
24	Lauren Gray	Holden Torana													11th	10th	9th	21
26	Fred Axisa	Holden Commodore				Ret	8th	8th										18
26	Grant Doulman	Holden Commodore							12th	12th	9th							18
28	Graeme Gilliland	Mazda RX-7				10th	11th	14th										16
28	Chris Aston	Holden Commodore										10th	8th	DNS				16
30	Neil Bryson	Ford Mustang				Ret	10th	10th										14
31	Chris Jackson	Holden Calibra							Ret	5th	Ret							12
31	Graham Smith	Opel Calibra							5th	Ret	DNS							12
33	Geoff Brown	Ford Falcon							DNS	15th	11th							8
34	Garry Roberts	Holden Torana				12th	15th	Ret										7
35	Jake Williams	Holden Commodore							17th	17th	13th							6
35	Dave Pettit	Chevrolet Camaro				17th	14th	15th										6
37	Nick Smith	Fiat 131							13th	Ret	DNS							4
38	Chas Talbot	Holden Commodore				15th	18th	DNS										3
38	Keith Linnell	Ford Cortina				18th	17th	16th										3
40	Glen Pro	Ford Escort RS2000							18th	Ret	DNS							1
	Stuart Inwood	Ford Falcon AU							Ret	DNS	DNS							0
	Glenn White	Ford Capri										DNS	DNS	DNS				0

Colour	Result
Gold	Winner
Silver	Second place
Bronze	Third place
Green	Points classification
Blue	Non-points classification
Blue	Non-classified finish (NC)
Purple	Retired, not classified (Ret)
Red	Did not qualify (DNQ)
Red	Did not pre-qualify (DNPQ)
Black	Disqualified (DSQ)
White	Did not start (DNS)
White	Withdrew (WD)
White	Race cancelled (C)
Blank	Did not practice (DNP)
Blank	Did not arrive (DNA)
Blank	Excluded (EX)
