= 2015 Kerrick Sports Sedan Series =

Motor racing competition

The 2015 Kerrick Sports Sedan Series was an Australian motor racing competition open to Sports Sedans and Trans Am style cars. It was sanctioned by the Confederation of Australian Motor Sport as a National Series and was the twelfth National Series for Sports Sedans to be contested following the discontinuation of the Australian Sports Sedan Championship at the end of 2003. The 2015 series was won by Tony Ricciardello driving an Alfa Romeo GTV.

== Calendar ==
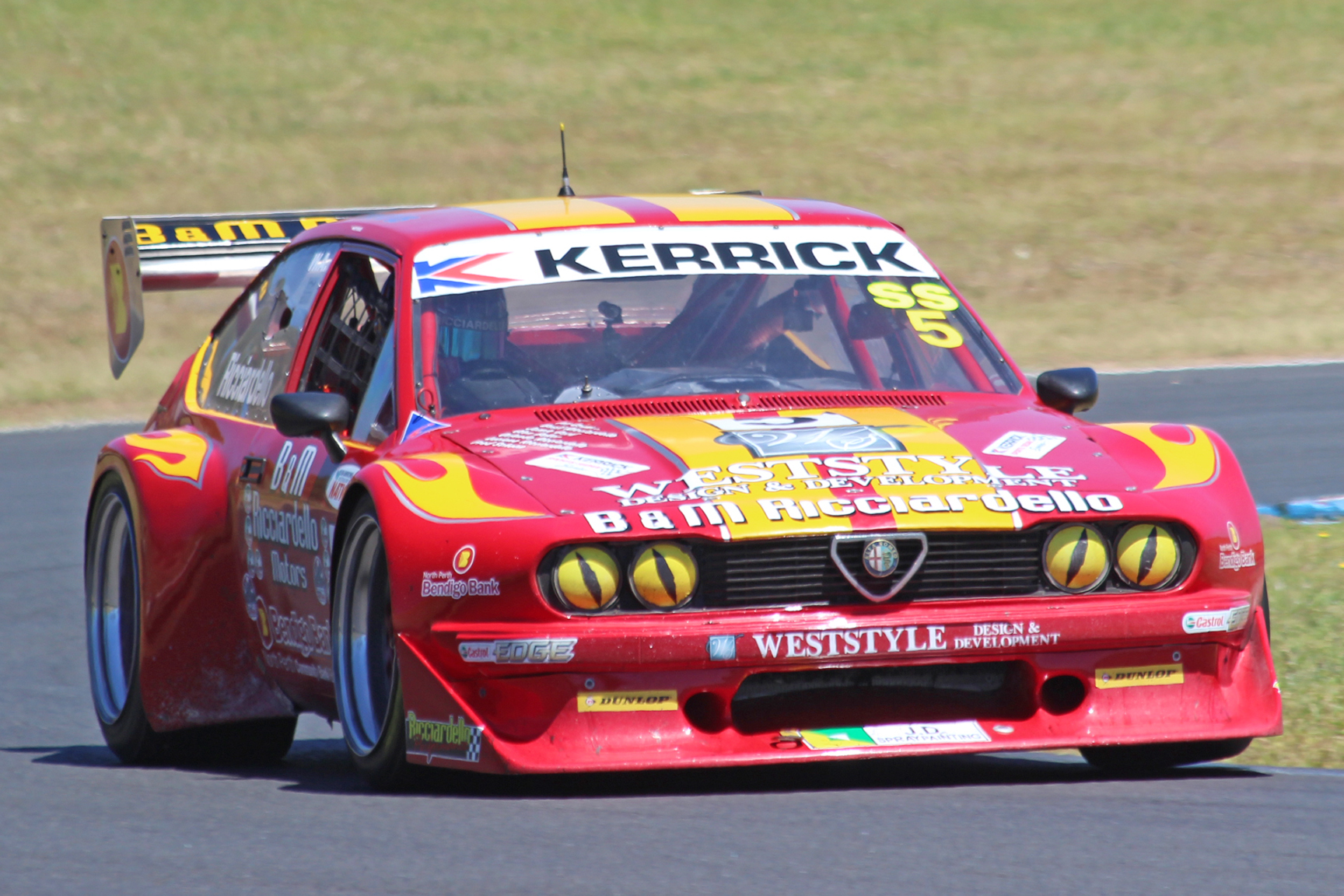
Tony Ricciardello placed first in the series driving an Alfa Romeo GTV (pictured above in 2014)

The series was contested over five rounds.

Round	Circuit	Date	Format	Round winner	Car
1	Sandown	27–29 March	Three races	Tony Ricciardello	Alfa Romeo GTV
2	Winton	15–17 May	Three races	Tony Ricciardello	Alfa Romeo GTV
3	Queensland Raceway	7–9 August	Three races	Jack Perkins	Audi A4
4	Wakefield Park	16–18 October	Three races	Jack Perkins	Audi A4
5	Sydney Motorsport Park	13–15 November	Three races	Jack Perkins	Audi A4

The results for each round were determined by the number of points scored by each driver at that round.

== Classes structure ==
Cars competed in the following classes:

- Class SS: Automobiles complying with the provisions of the CAMS Group 3D regulations for Sport Sedans.
- Class TA: Trans Am type automobiles complying with the 2015 Sports Sedan Series Technical Regulations for Class TA.
- Class M: MARC cars

== Points system ==
Series points were awarded to drivers for their outright finishing positions in each race on the following basis:

Position	1st	2nd	3rd	4th	5th	6th	7th	8th	9th	10th	11th	12th	13th	14th	15th & below
Race 1	30	28	26	24	22	20	18	16	14	12	10	8	6	4	2
Race 2	45	42	39	36	33	30	27	24	21	18	15	12	9	6	3
Race 3	60	56	52	48	44	40	36	32	28	24	20	16	12	8	4

== Series standings ==
Final series standings were as follows:

Position	Driver	No.	Car	Class	Competitor / Team	San	Win	Que	Wak	Syd	Total
1	Tony Ricciardello	1	Alfa Romeo Alfetta GTV	SS	B&M Ricciardello Motors	133	131	78	122	120	584
2	Steven Tamasi	9	Holden Calibra	SS	Domain Prestige Homes	119	107	117	110	70	523
3	Thomas Randle	93	Saab 9-3 Aero	SS	Kerrick / CKAS	115	128	92	95	84	514
4	Jack Perkins	4	Audi A4	SS	Auto Union Deutsche	0	0	135	135	135	405
5	Colin Smith	44	Holden Monaro	SS	MR Automotive	63	105	56	79	62	365
6	Bruce Banks	56	Mazda RX-7	SS	BJ Banks Electrical	66	80	59	70	59	334
7	Shane Woodman	16	BMW M3 GTR	SS	Landells Signs	0	100	60	101	0	261
8	Michael Robinson	32	Holden Monaro	SS	Bell Real Estate	0	69	83	82	0	234
9	Bruce Henley	43	Mazda RX-8	SS	Stawell Cartage	51	75	0	67	0	193
10	Kerry Baily	58	Aston Martin DBR9	SS	Rent Depot	110	0	48	0	0	158
11	Andrew Brown	60	Chevrolet Camaro	TA	Andrew Brown Motorsport	78	48	0	0	0	126
12	Phil Crompton	12	Ford Mustang	TA	Moonbi Oil Traders	0	0	74	0	24	98
13	Shane Bradford	68	Chevrolet Camaro	TA	Aston Air Conditioning	0	0	97	0	0	97
14	Paul Morris	91	Ford Focus	M	MARC Cars Australia	96	0	0	0	0	96
15	Dean Camm	66	Chevrolet Corvette	TA	Five Star Fencing & Gates	87	0	0	0	0	87
16	Michael Benton	92	Ford Focus	M	MARC Cars Australia	42	0	30	0	0	72
17	Keith Kassulke	91	Ford Focus	M	MARC Cars Australia	0	0	51	0	0	51
18	Darren Hossack	4	Audi A4	SS	Auto Union Deutsche	42	0	0	0	0	42
19	Tony Alford	54	Ford Focus	M	MARC Cars Australia	0	0	39	0	0	39
20	Peter McLeod	50	Mazda RX-7	SS	Slick 50	0	14	0	0	0	14

== Class TA award ==
Reference was made in the sporting regulations regarding a Class TA award however results for this were not included with the official published series points table.
