= 2002 Australian Sports Sedan Championship =

Motor racing competition

The 2002 Australian Sports Sedan Championship was an Australian motor racing competition open to Group 3D Sports Sedans. The title, which is recognised by the Confederation of Australian Motor Sport as the 18th Australian Sports Sedan Championship, was won by Tony Ricciardello driving an Alfa Romeo GTV Chevrolet.

== Calendar ==
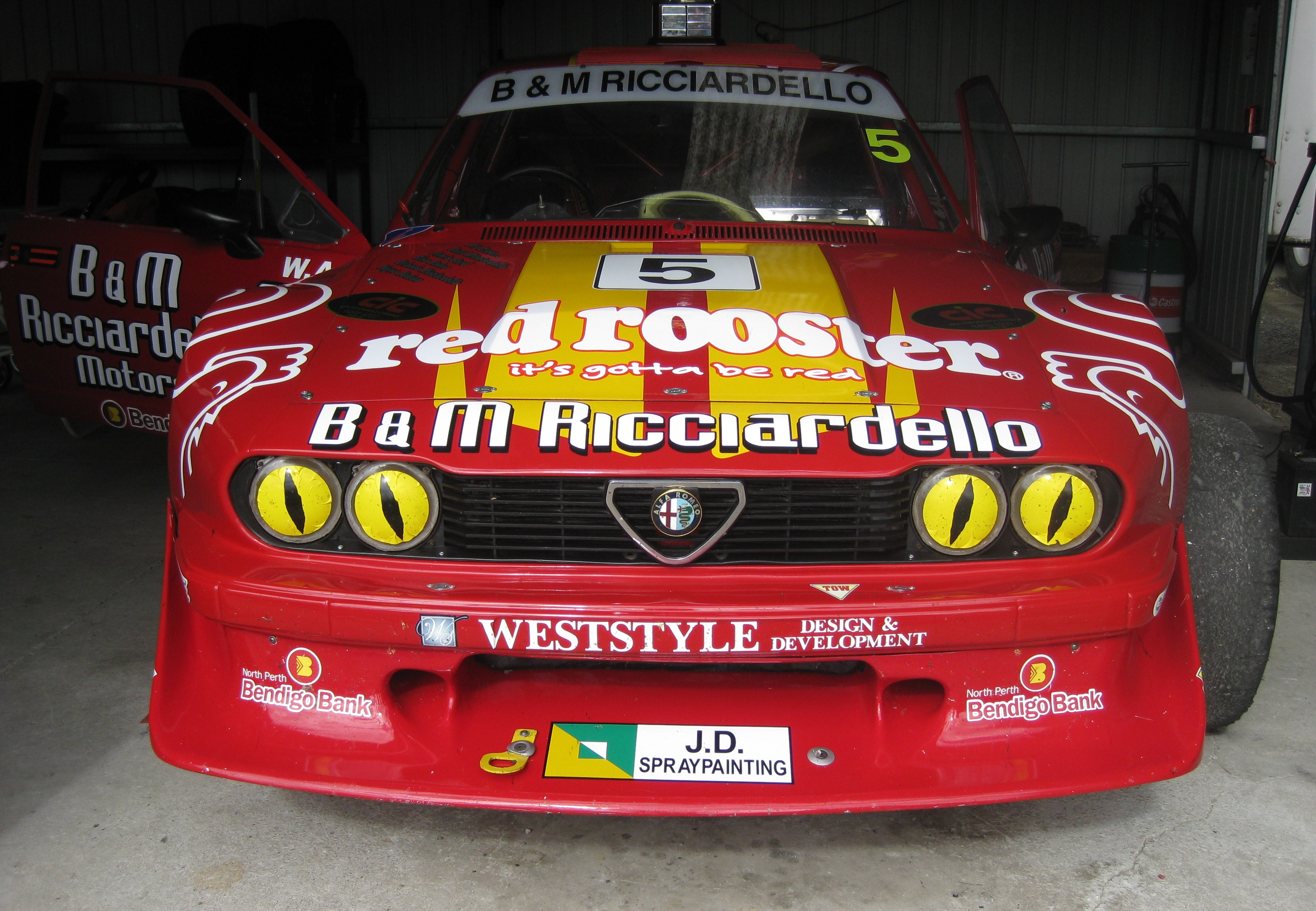
Tony Ricciardello won the 2002 title driving an Alfa Romeo GTV (pictured above in 2011)

The championship was contested over a five round series.

Rd.	Circuit	State	Date	Format
1	Phillip Island	Victoria	12–14 April	Two races
2	Oran Park	New South Wales	14–16 June	Three races
3	Oran Park	New South Wales	26–28 July	Two races
4	Queensland Raceway	Queensland	13–15 September	Two races
5	Sandown Raceway	Victoria	29 November - 1 December	Two races

== Points system ==
Championship points were awarded on a 20-17-15-14-13-12-11-10-9-8 basis for 1st through to 10th place in each race and an additional point was awarded to the driver setting the fastest time in Qualifying for each round.

Vehicles broadly similar to Group 3D Sports Sedans were able to compete in championship races by invitation, however, only drivers of cars issued with a Group 3D log book were eligible to score points.

== Standings ==
Position	Driver	No.	Car	Entrant	Points
1	Tony Ricciardello	1	Alfa Romeo Alfetta GTV Chevrolet	B&M Ricciardello Motors	200
2	Darren Hossack	4	Saab 9-3 Aero Chevrolet	Darren Hossack	145
3	Tony Wilson	27	Holden VS Commodore Chevrolet	The Smash Repair Centre	133
4	Kerry Baily	28	Nissan 300ZX Chevrolet	STS Signs	126
5	Dean Randle	93	Saab 9-3 Aero Chevrolet	Swedish Prestige	106
6	Daniel Jameson	45	Jaguar XKR Chevrolet	Daniel Jameson	91
7	Des Wall	20	Toyota Supra Chevrolet	Spies Hecker	78
8	Jeff Barnes	6	Pontiac Firebird Trans Am Chevrolet	Jeff Barnes	62
9	Mark Stinson	13	Holden Calibra Chevrolet	AGM Engineering	55
10	Mick Monterosso	2	Ford Escort RS2000 Chevrolet	Clipsal / Boffa & Russo	51
11	Ivan Mikac	42	Mazda RX-7	Quadron Motorsport	41
12	Luke Youlden	9	Mazda RX-7	Centreline Suspension	32
13	Glen Taylor	19	Holden VN Commodore Chevrolet	Glen Taylor	29
=	Raymond Ayton	99	Holden Calibra Chevrolet	Reward Insurance	29
15	Michael Robinson	32	Holden VN Commodore Chevrolet	Bell Real Estate	26
16	Geoff Gillespie	15	Fiat 131 Turbo	Euro Speed Motor Sport	23
17	Mike Roddy	33	Jaguar XJS	Mike Roddy Jag Service	21
=	Stephen Voight	5	Chevrolet Monza	Stephen Voight	21
19	Robert Smith	72	Holden VS Commodore	Smiths Trucks Pty Ltd	19
20	Mark Duggan	11	Holden Calibra Chevrolet	Mark Duggan	18
21	Milton Seferis	96	Holden VS Commodore	Highbury Automotive Service	17
=	Stephen Lichtenberger	5	Mazda RX-7 Chevrolet	Habib Bros Smash Repairs	17
23	Graeme Gilliland	21	Mazda RX-7	Greme Gilliland	11
24	Anton Abramovich	43	Mazda RX-7 Turbo	Mazprep Race Engines	10
=	David Walden	19	Honda Prelude	Electromaster	10
=	Steven Vines	77	Ford Cortina	Jor Pirotta	10
27	Terry Shiel	111	Mazda RX-7 Nissan Turbo	Terry Shiel	9
=	Shane Bradford	68	Mazda 121	Shane Bradford	9
