= 2014 Kerrick Sports Sedan Series =

Motor racing competition

The 2014 Kerrick Sports Sedan Series was an Australian motor racing competition open to Sports Sedans and Trans Am style cars. It was sanctioned by the Confederation of Australian Motor Sport as a National Series and was the eleventh National Series for Sports Sedans contested following the discontinuation of the Australian Sports Sedan Championship at the end of 2003. The 2014 series was won by Tony Ricciardello driving an Alfa Romeo GTV.

== Calendar ==
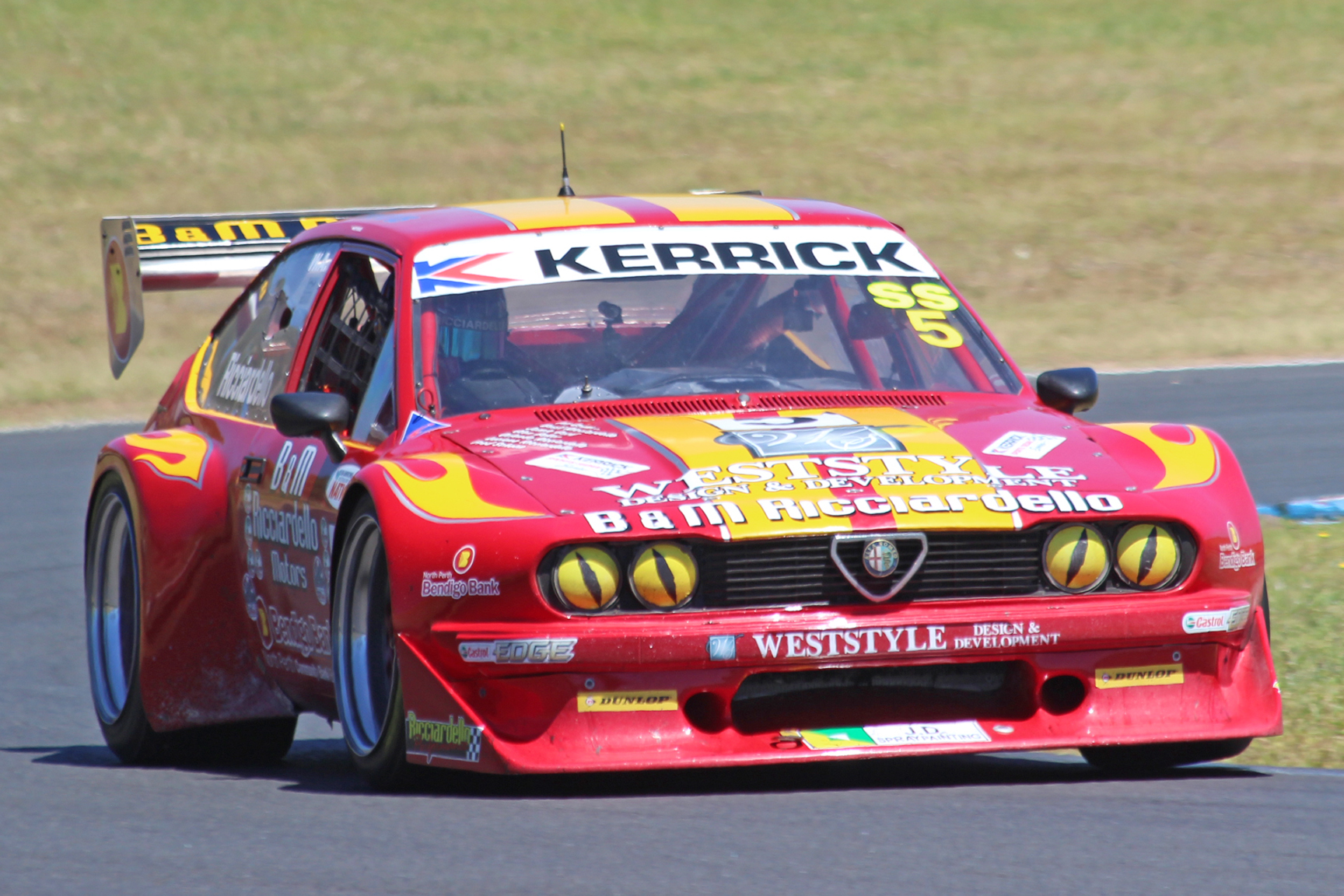
Tony Ricciardello placed first in the series driving an Alfa Romeo GTV

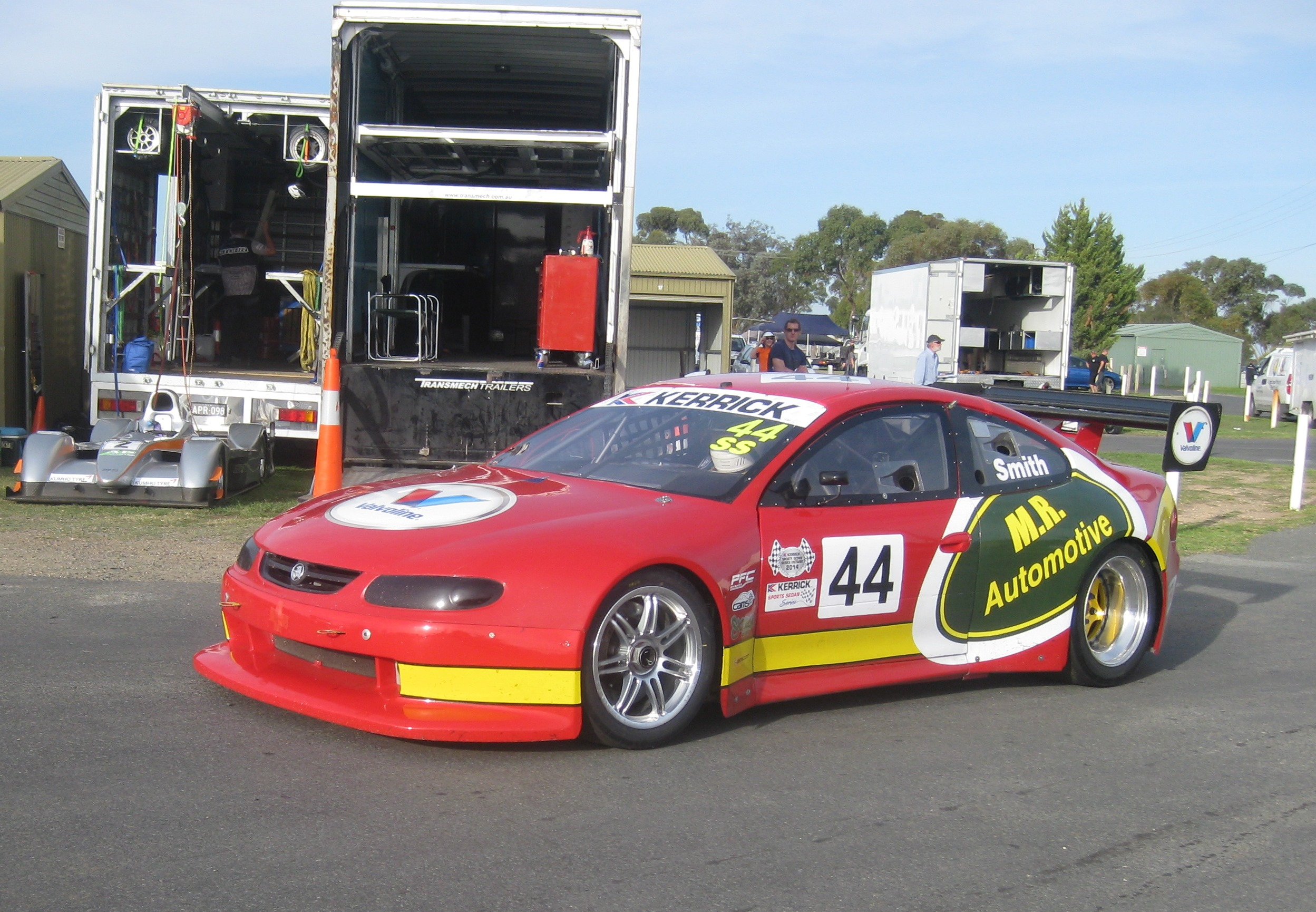
Colin Smith placed second driving a Holden Monaro

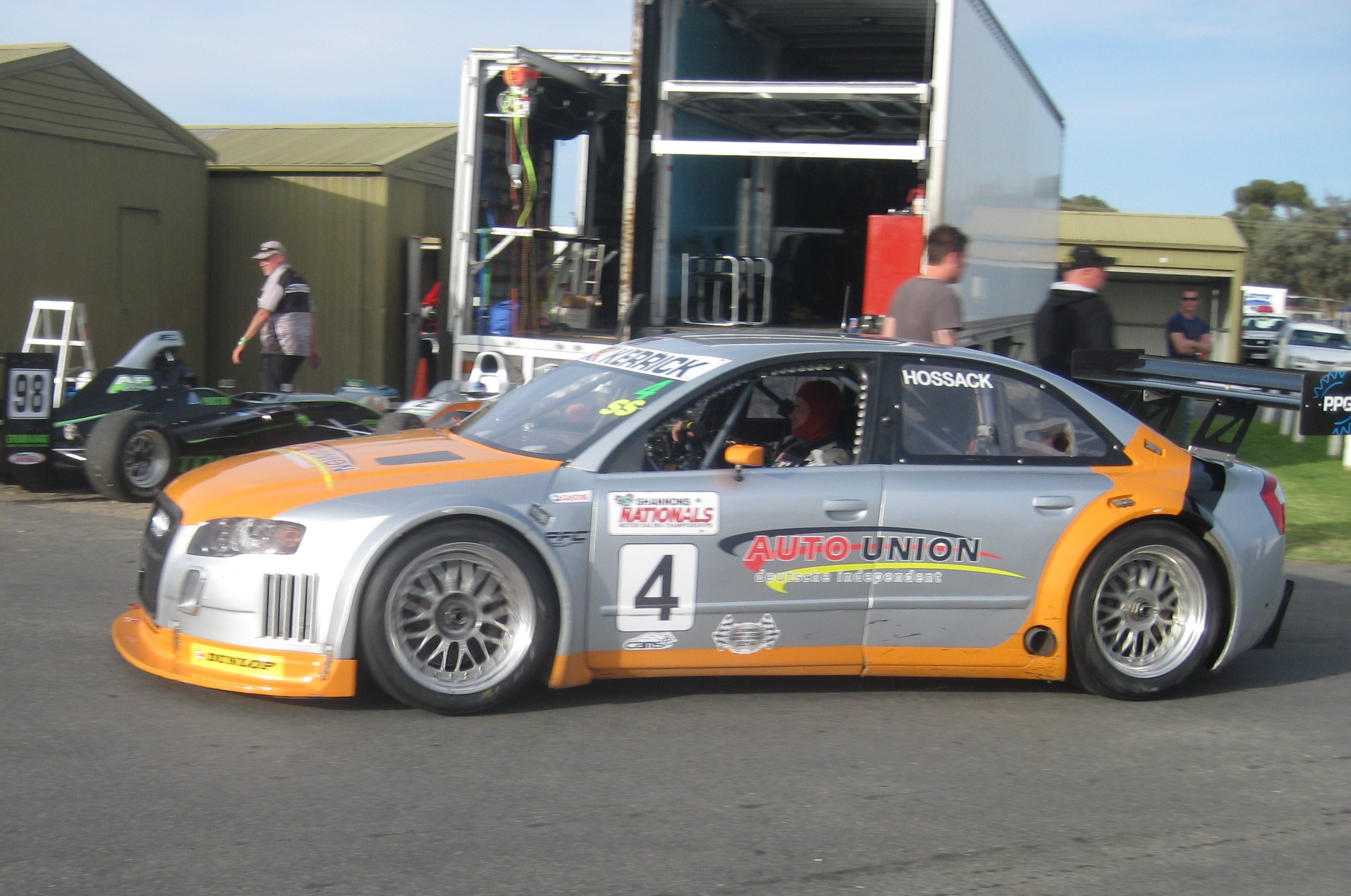
Darren Hossack placed third driving an Audi A4

The 2014 Kerrick Sports Sedan Series was contested over five rounds.

Round	Circuit	Date	Format	Round winner	Car
1	Mallala Motor Sport Park	26 – 27 April	Three races	Tony Ricciardello	Alfa Romeo GTV
2	Winton Motor Raceway	14 – 15 June	Three races	Tony Ricciardello	Alfa Romeo GTV
3	Queensland Raceway	9 – 10 August	Three races	Tony Ricciardello	Alfa Romeo GTV
4	Phillip Island Grand Prix Circuit	20 – 21 September	Three races	Michael Robinson	Holden Monaro
5	Sydney Motorsport Park	1 – 2 November	Three races	Tony Ricciardello	Alfa Romeo GTV

The results for each round were determined by the number of points scored by each driver at that round.

== Classes structure ==
Cars competed in two classes:

- Class SS: Automobiles complying with the provisions of the CAMS Group 3D regulations for Sport Sedans.
- Class TA: Trans Am type automobiles complying with the 2014 Sports Sedan Series Technical Regulations for Class TA.

== Points system ==
Series points were awarded to drivers for their outright finishing positions in each race on the following basis:

Position	1st	2nd	3rd	4th	5th	6th	7th	8th	9th	10th	11th	12th	13th	14th	15th & below
Race 1	30	28	26	24	22	20	18	16	14	12	10	8	6	4	2
Race 2	45	42	39	36	33	30	27	24	21	18	15	12	9	6	3
Race 3	60	56	52	48	44	40	36	32	28	24	20	16	12	8	4

== Series standings ==
Final series standings were as follows:

Pos.	Driver	No.	Car	Class	Competitor / Team	Mal	Win	Que	Phi	Syd	Total
1	Tony Ricciardello	5	Alfa Romeo Alfetta GTV	SS	B&M Ricciardello Motors	135	135	135	80	133	618
2	Colin Smith	44	Holden Monaro	SS	MR Automotive	101	101	92	76	89	459
3	Darren Hossack	4	Audi A4	SS	Auto Union Deutsche	122	28	126	30	128	434
4	Michael Robinson	32	Holden Monaro	SS	Bell Real Estate	86	48	100	84	72	390
5	Bruce Henley	67	Mazda RX-8	SS	Stawell Cartage	85	88	74	66	77	390
6	Steven Tamasi	9	Holden Calibra	SS	Domain Prestige Homes	117	124	26	26	91	384
7	Bruce Banks	1	Mazda RX-7	SS	BJ Banks Electrical	110	110	93	22	0	335
8	Phil Crompton	12	Ford Mustang	TA	Moonbi Oil Traders	0	0	115	0	106	221
9	Shane Bradford	68	Chevrolet Camaro	TA	Aston Air Conditioning	0	107	49	0	0	156
10	Simon Pfitzner	8	Ford EF Falcon	SS	Pfitzner Performance Gearbox	63	48	0	0	0	111
11	Ron Moller	7	Chevrolet Camaro	TA	AMS Racing	0	0	0	0	92	92
12	Charlie Senese	81	Chevrolet Corvette	TA	The Car Mine / Liqui Moly / Meguia	72	4	0	0	0	76

Race two at Phillip Island was cancelled due to an accident and no points were awarded.

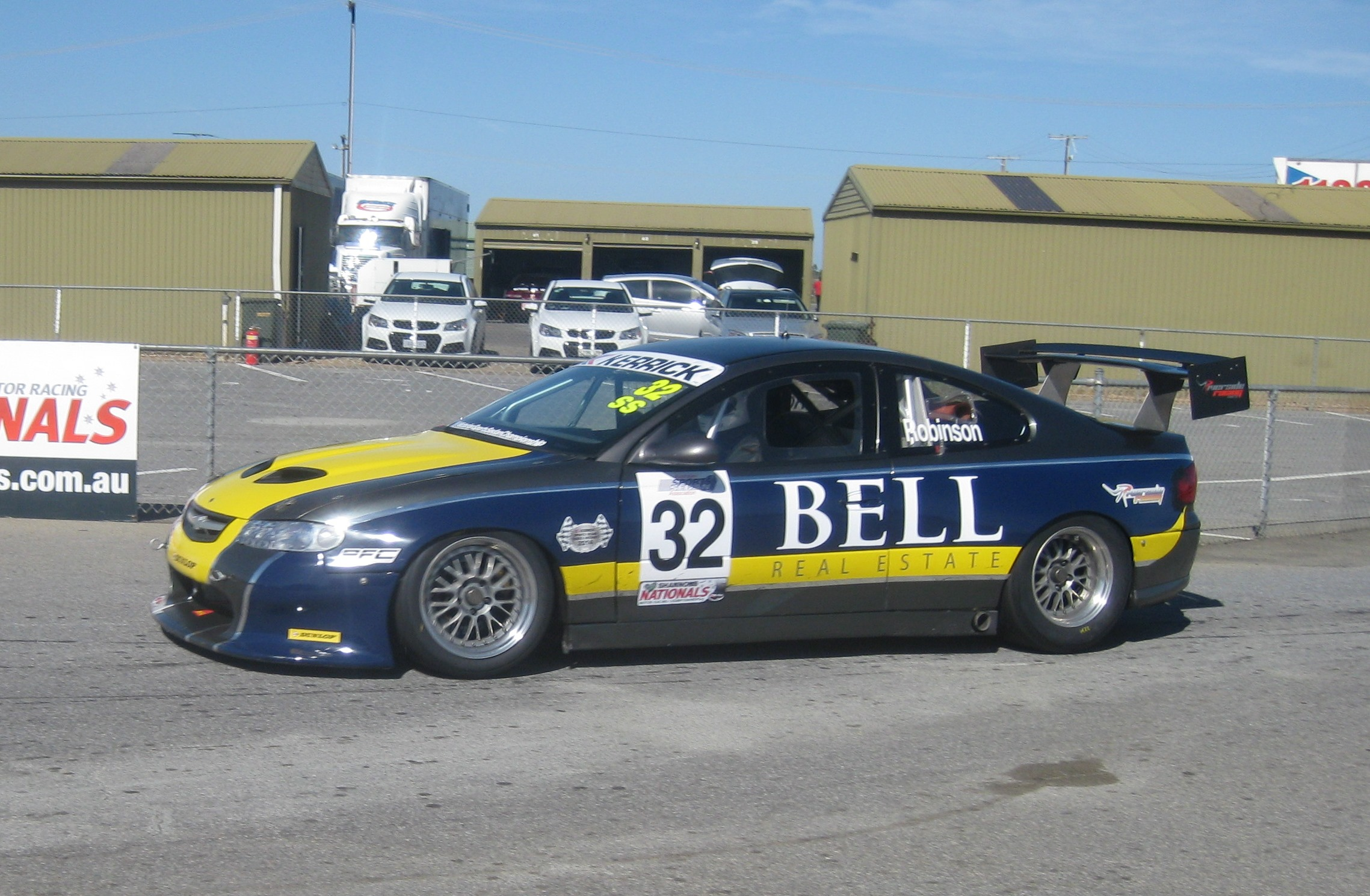
Michael Robinson placed fourth driving a Holden Monaro

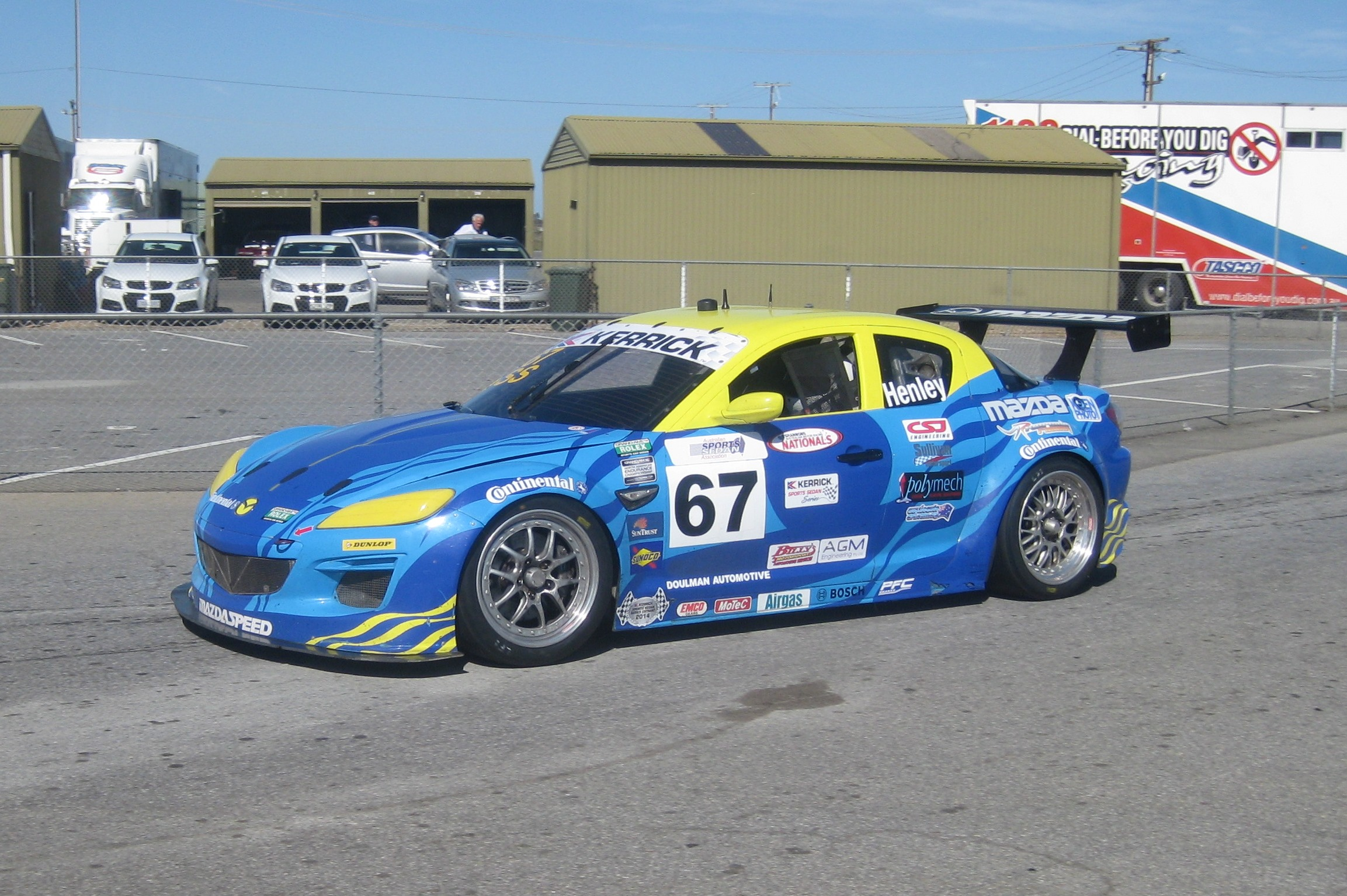
Bruce Henley placed fifth driving a Mazda RX-8

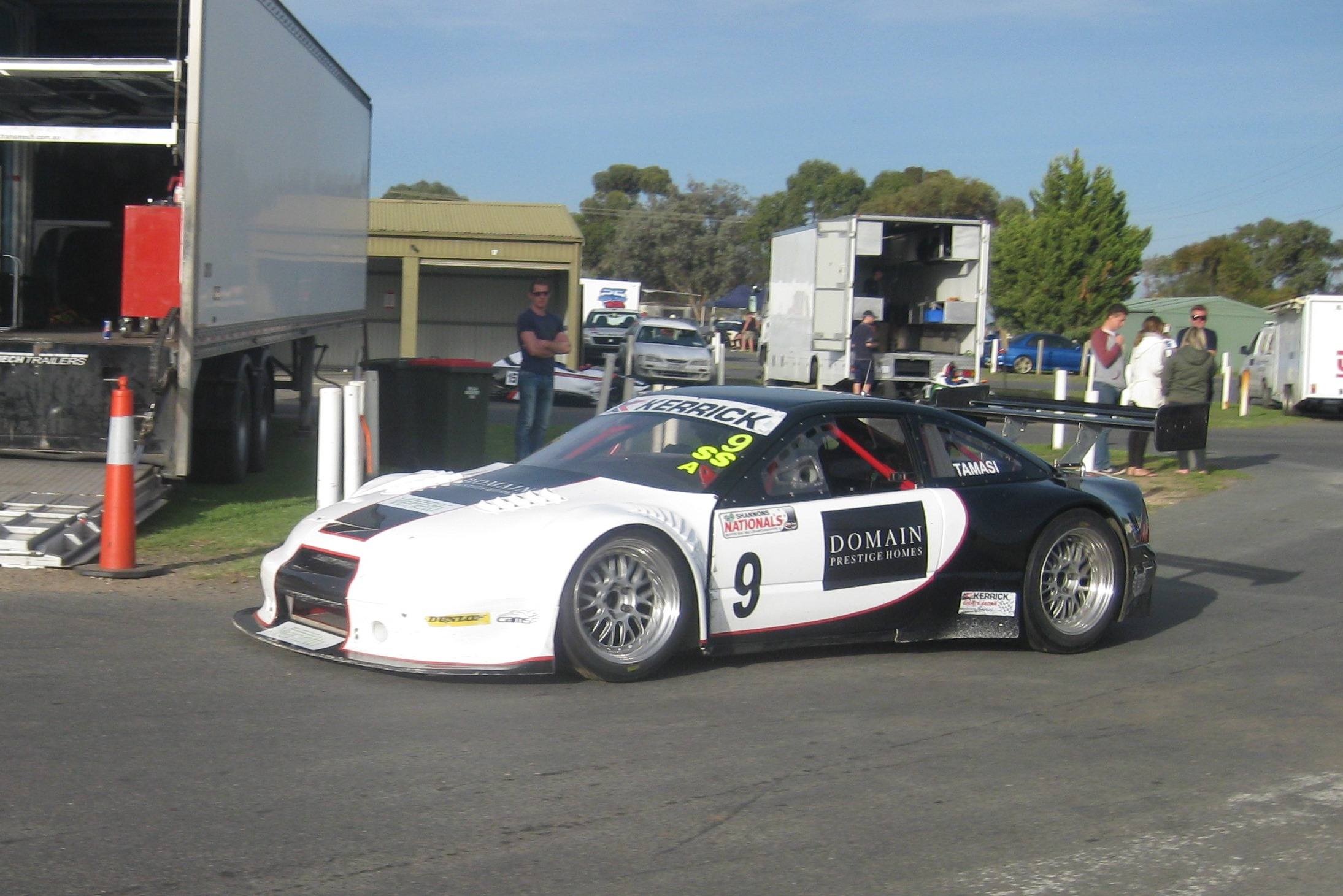
Steven Tamasi placed sixth in a Holden Calibra

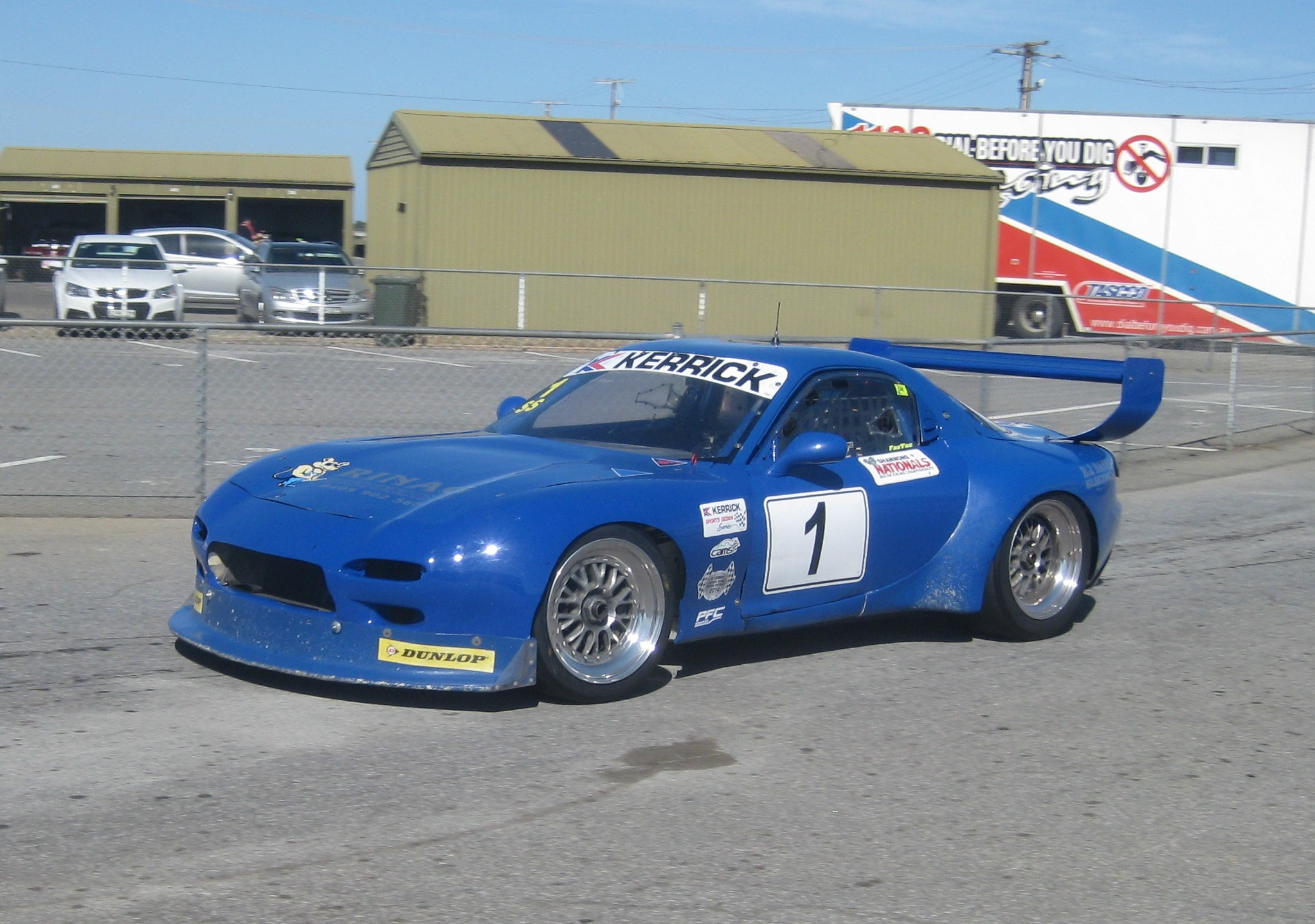
Bruce Banks placed seventh driving a Mazda RX-7

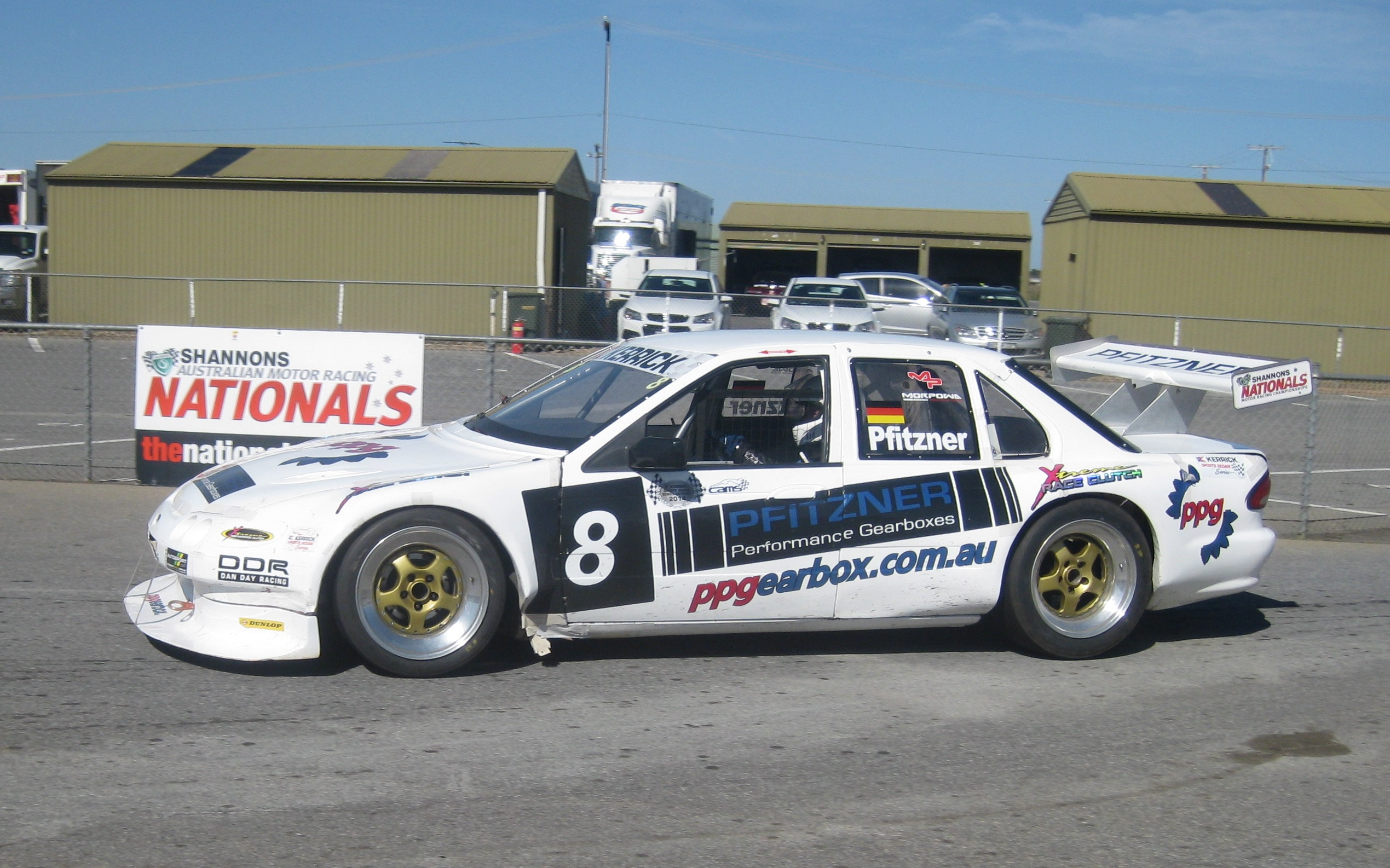
Simon Pfitzner placed tenth driving a Ford Falcon

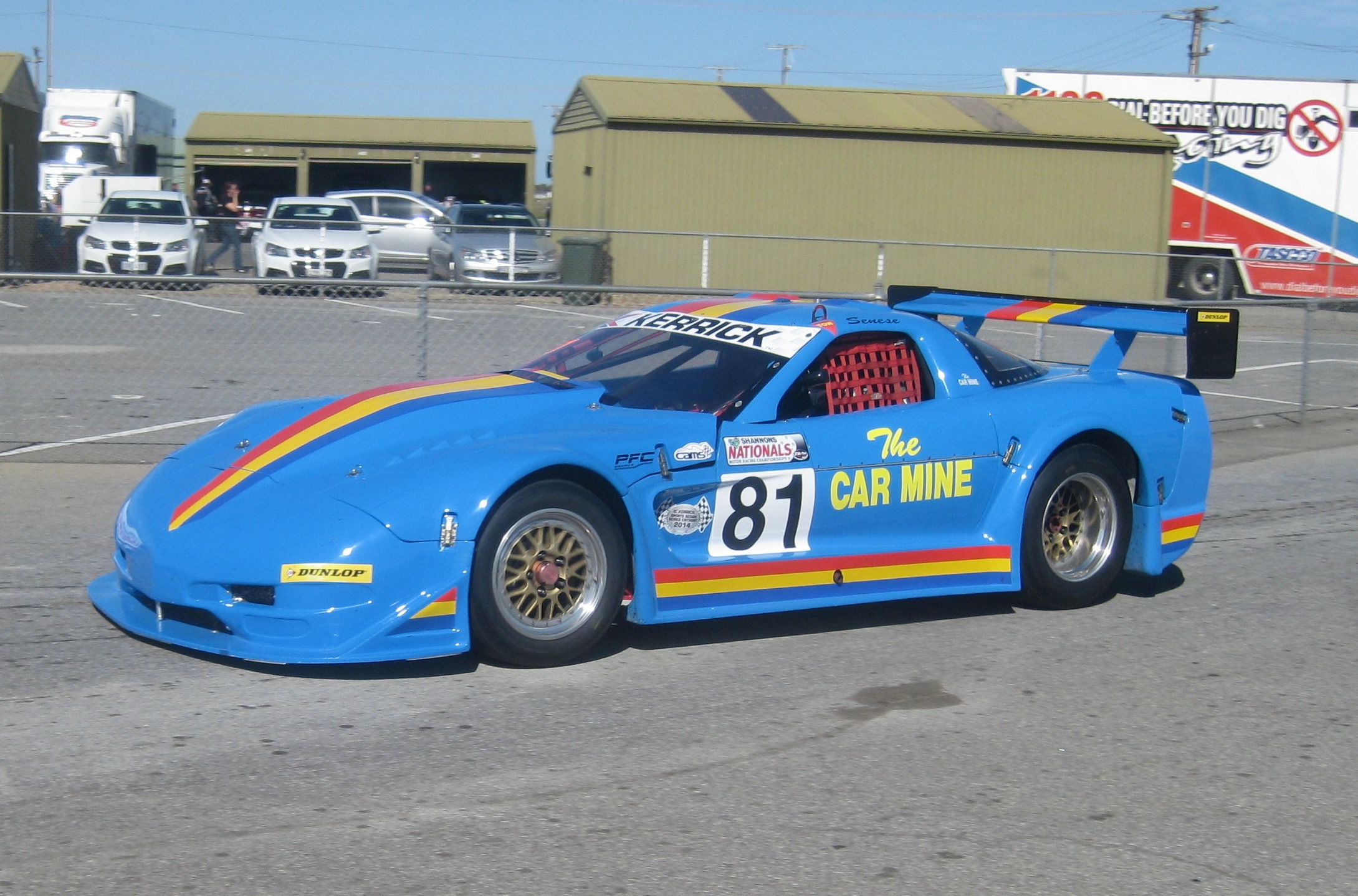
Charlie Senese placed twelfth driving a Chevrolet Corvette

== Class TA award ==
Reference was made in the sporting regulations regarding a Class TA award however results for this were not included with the official published series points table.
