= Tony Ricciardello =

Australian race car driver (born 1979)

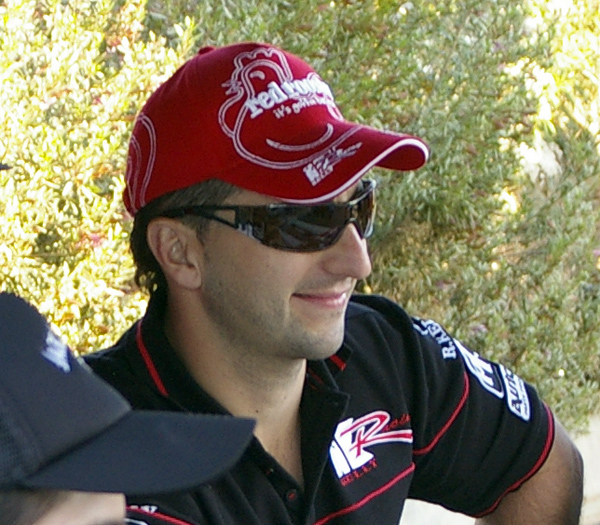
- Tony Riciardello in 2009
- Nationality: Australian
- Born: 19 March 1979 (age 47) Perth, Western Australia

Australian Sports Sedan Series career
- Years active: 1998–2009, 2011-2019, 2023
- Teams: Ricciardello Racing
- Best finish: 1st in 1998, 1999, 2001, 2002, 2005, 2007, 2011, 2014, 2015, 2016, 2019 & 2023

Previous series
- 2001,03,06,09–10 2003: V8 Supercars Championship Konica V8 Supercar Series

Championship titles
- 1998–99, 2001–02: Australian Sports Sedan Championship

Tony Ricciardello (born 19 March 1979) is a multiple-championship winning Australian race car driver.

Son of Sports Sedan racer and team owner Basil Ricciardello, Tony was brought up into the Western Australian racing scene. He eventually replaced Brian Smith as the driver of the Ricciardello Racing, Chevrolet V8 powered, space-frame constructed, Alfa Romeo Alfetta GTV bodied Sports Sedan in the national series. Ricciardello has won the national series twelve times, the all-time record for the category, and has finished inside the top-three positions in each of the thirteen series which he contested. Ricciardello is one of just two drivers to win a title seven times in the same class of Australian bitumen-surface circuit racing.

Ricciardello has also raced in the V8 Supercar category. He contested a number of races with Britek Motorsport in the 2006 V8 Supercar Championship Series and has spent several seasons as a co-driver in the two annual two-driver endurance races. In 2010, Ricciardello contested his first full season in V8 Supercars, driving the #16 Holden Commodore (VE) for Kelly Racing in the Championship. The relationship did not continue into 2011 and Ricciardello returned to the Sports Sedans category, winning the 2011 Kerrick Sports Sedan Series.

== Career results ==
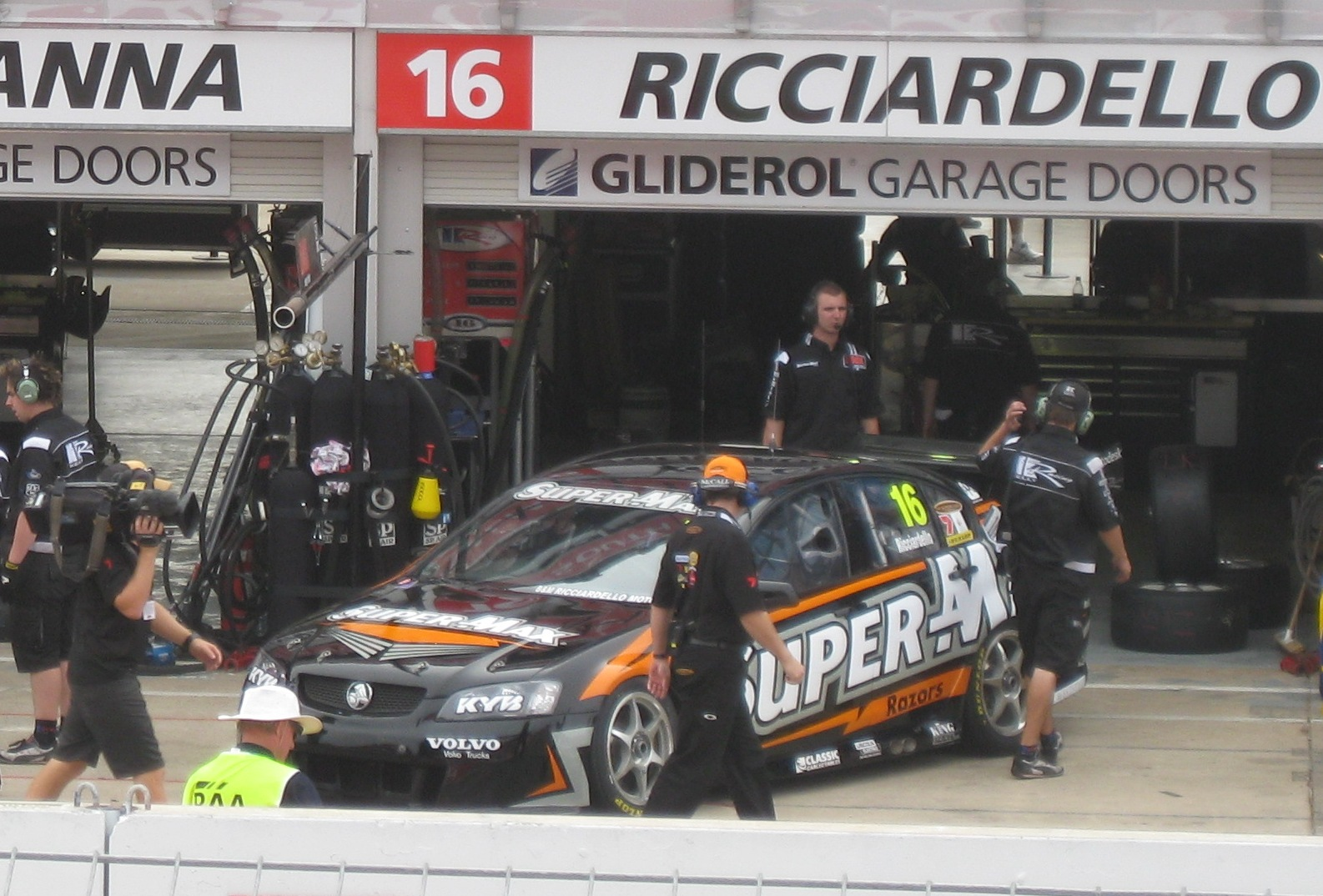
The Holden Commodore (VE) driven by Tony Ricciardello in the 2010 V8 Supercar Championship Series.

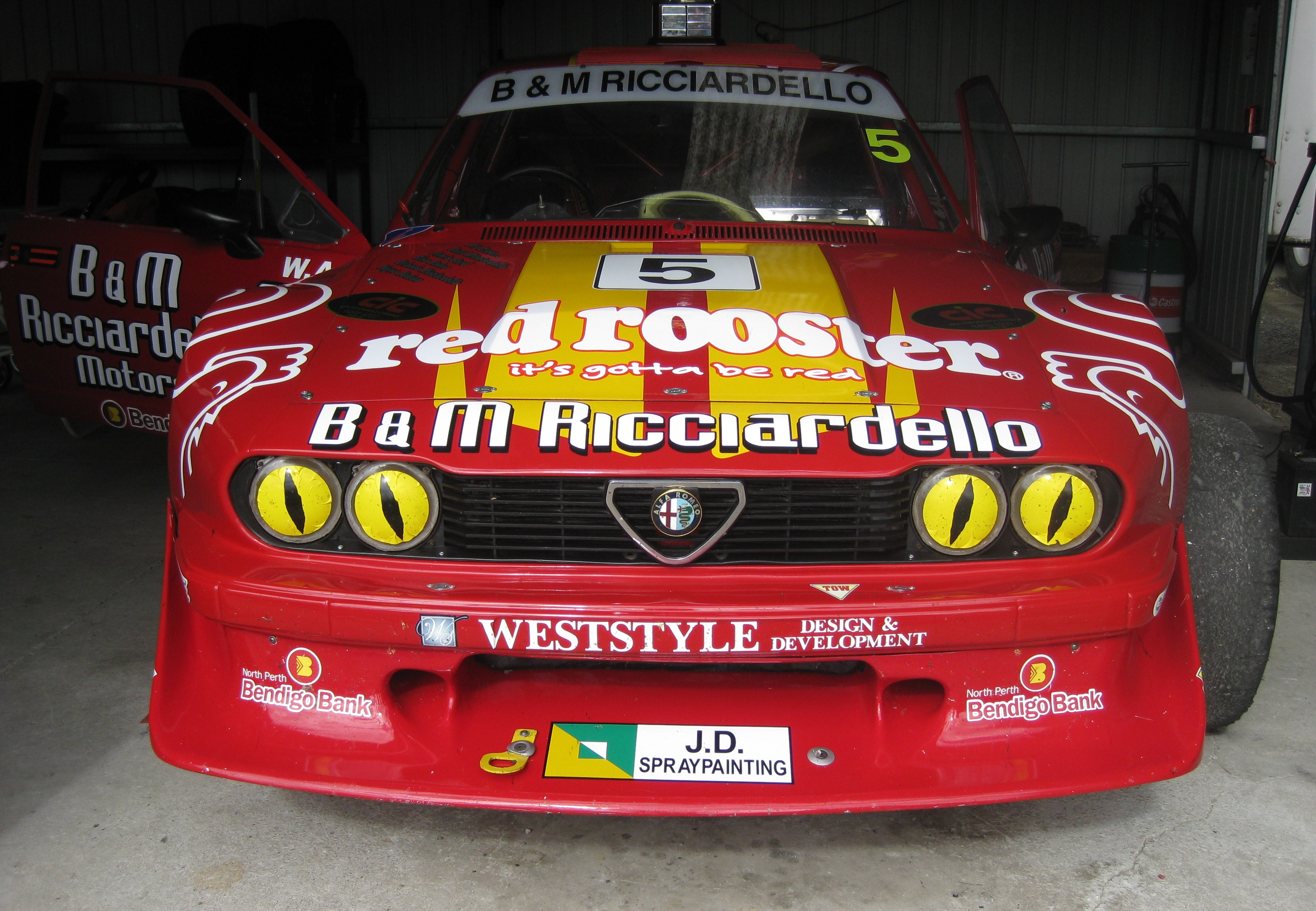
The Alfa Romeo Alfetta GTV of Tony Ricciardello at Mallala Motor Sport Park for the opening round of the 2011 Kerrick Sports Sedan Series

| Season | Series | Position | Car | Team |
|---|---|---|---|---|
| 1997 | Australian Formula Ford Championship | NC | Swift SC93F – Ford Kent | Ricciardello Racing |
| 1998 | Australian Sports Sedan Championship | **1st** | Alfa Romeo Alfetta GTV – Chevrolet | Ricciardello Racing |
| 1999 | Australian Sports Sedan Championship | **1st** | Alfa Romeo Alfetta GTV – Chevrolet | Ricciardello Racing |
| 2000 | Australian Sports Sedan Championship | **2nd** | Alfa Romeo Alfetta GTV – Chevrolet | Ricciardello Racing |
| 2001 | Australian Sports Sedan Championship | **1st** | Alfa Romeo Alfetta GTV – Chevrolet | Ricciardello Racing |
| 2001 | Shell Championship Series | 57th | Holden Commodore (VX) | Imrie Motor Sport; Rod Nash Racing |
| 2002 | Australian Sports Sedan Championship | **1st** | Alfa Romeo Alfetta GTV – Chevrolet | Ricciardello Racing |
| 2003 | Australian Sports Sedan Championship | **3rd** | Alfa Romeo Alfetta GTV – Chevrolet | B & M Ricciardello |
| 2003 | Konica V8 Supercar Series | 17th | Ford Falcon (AU) | Dick Johnson Racing |
| 2003 | V8 Supercar Championship Series | 63rd | Holden Commodore (VX) | John Faulkner Racing |
| 2004 | Tranzam Sports Sedan Series | **2nd** | Alfa Romeo Alfetta GTV – Chevrolet | Ricciardello Racing |
| 2005 | Tranzam Sports Sedan Series | **1st** | Alfa Romeo Alfetta GTV – Chevrolet | Ricciardello Racing |
| 2005 | Sepang 12 Hours | **1st** | Lotus Exige 300RR | Proton R3 Apex |
| 2006 | Kerrick Sports Sedan Series | **2nd** | Alfa Romeo Alfetta GTV – Chevrolet | Ricciardello Racing |
| 2006 | V8 Supercar Championship Series | 34th | Ford Falcon (BA) | Britek Motorsport |
| 2007 | Kerrick Sports Sedan Series | **1st** | Alfa Romeo Alfetta GTV – Chevrolet | Ricciardello Racing |
| 2008 | Kerrick Sports Sedan Series | **2nd** | Alfa Romeo Alfetta GTV – Chevrolet | Ricciardello Racing |
| 2009 | Kerrick Sports Sedan Series | **2nd** | Alfa Romeo Alfetta GTV – Chevrolet | Ricciardello Racing |
| 2009 | V8 Supercar Championship Series | 47th | Holden Commodore (VE) | Kelly Racing |
| 2010 | V8 Supercar Championship Series | 27th | Holden Commodore (VE) | Kelly Racing |
| 2011 | Kerrick Sports Sedan Series | **1st** | Alfa Romeo Alfetta GTV – Chevrolet | Ricciardello Racing |
| 2012 | Kerrick Sports Sedan Series | **2nd** | Alfa Romeo Alfetta GTV – Chevrolet | Ricciardello Racing |
| 2013 | Kerrick Sports Sedan Series | **2nd** | Alfa Romeo Alfetta GTV – Chevrolet | Ricciardello Racing |
| 2014 | Kerrick Sports Sedan Series | **1st** | Alfa Romeo GTV | B&M Ricciardello Motors |
| 2015 | Kerrick Sports Sedan Series | **1st** | Alfa Romeo GTV | B&M Ricciardello Motors |
| 2016 | Kerrick Sports Sedan Series | **1st** | Alfa Romeo GTV | Ricciardello Racing |
| 2018 | Skye Sands National Sports Sedan Series | 7th | Alfa Romeo GTV | Ricciardello Racing |
| 2019 | DEA Performance National Sports Sedan Series | **1st** | Alfa Romeo GTV | Ricciardello Racing |
| 2023 | Precision National Sports Sedan Series | **1st** | Alfa Romeo GTV | Ricciardello Racing |

=== Complete V8 Supercars results ===
(key) (Races in bold indicate pole position) (Races in italics indicate fastest lap)

| Year | Team | Car | 1 | 2 | 3 | 4 | 5 | 6 | 7 | 8 | 9 | 10 | 11 | 12 | 13 | 14 | 15 | 16 | 17 | 18 | 19 | 20 | 21 | 22 | 23 | 24 | 25 | 26 | 27 | 28 | 29 | 30 | 31 | 32 | 33 | 34 | Pos | Points |
|---|---|---|---|---|---|---|---|---|---|---|---|---|---|---|---|---|---|---|---|---|---|---|---|---|---|---|---|---|---|---|---|---|---|---|---|---|---|---|
| 1999 | Tomas Mezera Motorsport | Holden Commodore (VS) | EAS; R1 | EAS; R2 | EAS; R3 | ADE; R4 | BAR; R5 | BAR; R6 | BAR; R7 | PHI; R8 | PHI; R9 | PHI; R10 | HDV; R11 | HDV; R12 | HDV; R13 | SAN; R14 | SAN; R15 | SAN; R16 | QLD; R17 | QLD; R18 | QLD; R19 | CAL; R20 | CAL; R21 | CAL; R22 | SYM; R23 | SYM; R24 | SYM; R25 | WIN; R26 | WIN; R27 | WIN; R28 | ORA; R29 | ORA; R30 | ORA; R31 | QLD; R32 | BAT; R33; Ret | | N/A | 0 |
| 2001 | Imrie Motorsport | Holden Commodore (VX) | PHI; R1 | PHI; R2 | ADE; R3 | ADE; R4 | EAS; R5 | EAS; R6 | HDV; R7 | HDV; R8 | HDV; R9 | CAN; R10 | CAN; R11 | CAN; R12 | BAR; R13; 29 | BAR; R14; 29 | BAR; R15; 29 | CAL; R16 | CAL; R17 | CAL; R18 | ORA; R19 | ORA; R20 | QLD; R21 | WIN; R22 | WIN; R23 | BAT; R24 | PUK; R25 | PUK; R26 | PUK; R27 | SAN; R28 | SAN; R29 | SAN; R30 | | | | | 57th | 180 |
| 2001 | Rod Nash Racing | Holden Commodore (VX) | PHI; R1 | PHI; R2 | ADE; R3 | ADE; R4 | EAS; R5 | EAS; R6 | HDV; R7 | HDV; R8 | HDV; R9 | CAN; R10 | CAN; R11 | CAN; R12 | BAR; R13 | BAR; R14 | BAR; R15 | CAL; R16 | CAL; R17 | CAL; R18 | ORA; R19 | ORA; R20 | QLD; R21; 18 | WIN; R22 | WIN; R23 | BAT; R24; Ret | PUK; R25 | PUK; R26 | PUK; R27 | SAN; R28 | SAN; R29 | SAN; R30 | | | | | 57th | 180 |
| 2003 | John Faulkner Racing | Holden Commodore (VX) | ADE; R1 | ADE; R1 | PHI; R3 | EAS; R4 | WIN; R5 | BAR; R6 | BAR; R7 | BAR; R8 | HDV; R9 | HDV; R10 | HDV; R11 | QLD; R12 | ORA; R13 | SAN; R14; 24 | BAT; R15; Ret | SUR; R16 | SUR; R17 | PUK; R18 | PUK; R19 | PUK; R20 | EAS; R21 | EAS; R22 | | | | | | | | | | | | | 63rd | 100 |
| 2006 | Britek Motorsport | Ford Falcon (BA) | ADE; R1 | ADE; R2 | PUK; R3 | PUK; R4 | PUK; R5 | BAR; R6; 29 | BAR; R7; 27 | BAR; R8; Ret | WIN; R9 | WIN; R10 | WIN; R11 | HDV; R12; 30 | HDV; R13; 23 | HDV; R14; 29 | QLD; R15 | QLD; R16 | QLD; R17 | ORA; R18 | ORA; R19 | ORA; R20 | SAN; R21; 22 | BAT; R22; 16 | SUR; R23 | SUR; R24 | SUR; R25 | SYM; R26; 26 | SYM; R27; Ret | SYM; R28; 19 | BHR; R29 | BHR; R30 | BHR; R31 | PHI; R32 | PHI; R33 | PHI; R34 | 34th | 398 |
| 2009 | Kelly Racing | Holden Commodore (VE) | ADE; R1 | ADE; R2 | HAM; R3 | HAM; R4 | WIN; R5 | WIN; R6 | SYM; R7 | SYM; R8 | HDV; R9 | HDV; R10 | TOW; R11 | TOW; R12 | SAN; R13 | SAN; R14 | QLD; R15 | QLD; R16 | PHI; Q Ret | PHI; R17; 22 | BAT; R18; 17 | SUR; R19 | SUR; R20 | SUR; R21 | SUR; R22 | PHI; R23 | PHI; R24 | BAR; R25 | BAR; R26 | SYD; R27 | SYD; R28 | | | | | | 47th | 183 |
| 2010 | Kelly Racing | Holden Commodore (VE) | YMC; R1; 24 | YMC; R2; 25 | BHR; R3; 25 | BHR; R4; 21 | ADE; R5; 20 | ADE; R6; 21 | HAM; R7; 23 | HAM; R8; Ret | QLD; R9; 26 | QLD; R10; 22 | WIN; R11; 27 | WIN; R12; 20 | HDV; R13; 25 | HDV; R14; 27 | TOW; R15; 25 | TOW; R16; 20 | PHI; R17; 25 | BAT; R18; 22 | SUR; R19; Ret | SUR; R20; 18 | SYM; R21; 26 | SYM; R22; Ret | SAN; R23; 26 | SAN; R24; 23 | SYD; R25; Ret | SYD; R26; 17 | | | | | | | | | 26th | 857 |

=== Complete Bathurst 1000 results ===
| Year | Team | Car | Co-driver | Position | Laps |
|---|---|---|---|---|---|
| 1999 | Tomas Mezera Motorsport | Holden Commodore (VT) | (Australia) Tomas Mezera | DNF | 41 |
| 2001 | Rod Nash Racing | Holden Commodore (VX) | (Australia) Rod Nash | DNF | 62 |
| 2003 | Holden Young Lions | Holden Commodore (VX) | (Australia) Dale Brede | DNF | 72 |
| 2006 | Britek Motorsport | Ford Falcon (BA) | (Australia) José Fernández | 16th | 159 |
| 2009 | Kelly Racing | Holden Commodore (VE) | (Australia) Mark McNally | 17th | 160 |
| 2010 | Kelly Racing | Holden Commodore (VE) | (Australia) Taz Douglas | 22nd | 158 |
