= Austin Rover Group =

British motor manufacturer

Austin Rover Group Limited
- The "chevron" logo of the Austin Rover Group, which originally represented all of the former British Leyland marques
- Industry: Automotive
- Predecessor: BL Cars Ltd
- Founded: 1982; 44 years ago
- Defunct: 1989; 37 years ago
- Fate: renamed
- Successor: Rover Group
- Headquarters: Longbridge, Birmingham, West Midlands, England
- Key people: Harold Musgrove; Graham Day
- Products: Automobiles
- Parent: British Leyland (1982–1986); Rover Group (1986–1989)

The Austin Rover Group (abbreviated ARG) was a British motor manufacturer. It was created in 1982 as the mass-market car manufacturing subsidiary of British Leyland (BL). Previously, this entity had been known as BL Cars Ltd (formerly Leyland Cars) which encompassed the Austin-Morris and Jaguar-Rover-Triumph divisions of British Leyland. After a major restructuring of BL's car manufacturing operations, Jaguar regained its independence (leading to its eventual de-merger in 1984) whilst the Triumph and Morris marques were retired. The new, leaner car business was rechristened as the Austin Rover Group and focused primarily on the Austin and Rover marques. The Morris and Triumph marques continued briefly within ARG until 1984 when both were dropped.

The Austin Rover brand was intended as a new public face for British Leyland, which had become tainted by the infamous industrial unrest and poor quality cars of the 1970s, although "BL" still existed as the name of the holding company "BL plc".

In 1989, two years after the Austin brand was also discontinued, ARG assumed the name of its parent company Rover Group plc, from which point the two entities were generally considered one and the same, although they continued to be legally separate – the holding company "BL plc" became Rover Group plc which also owned Land Rover.

== History ==
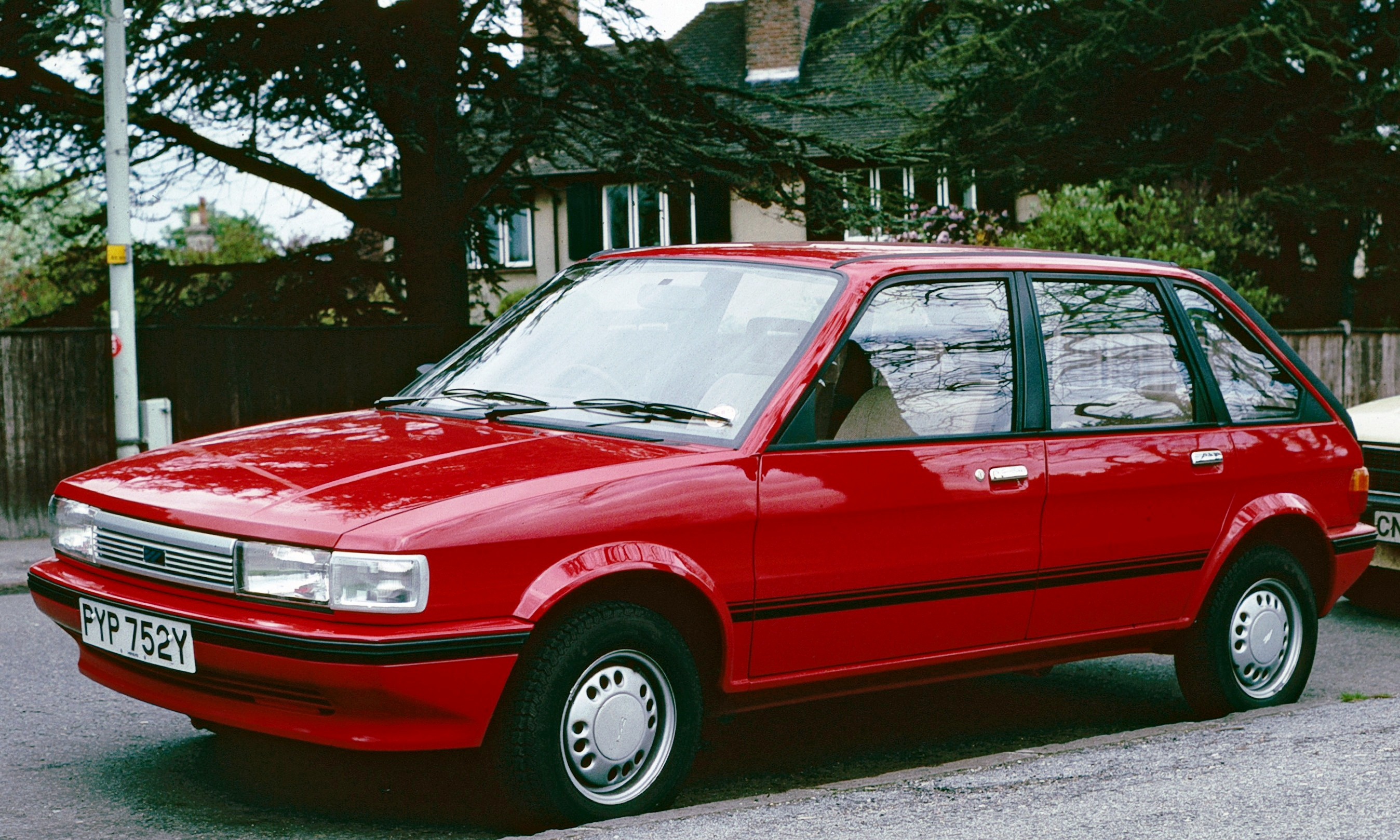
1983 Austin Maestro

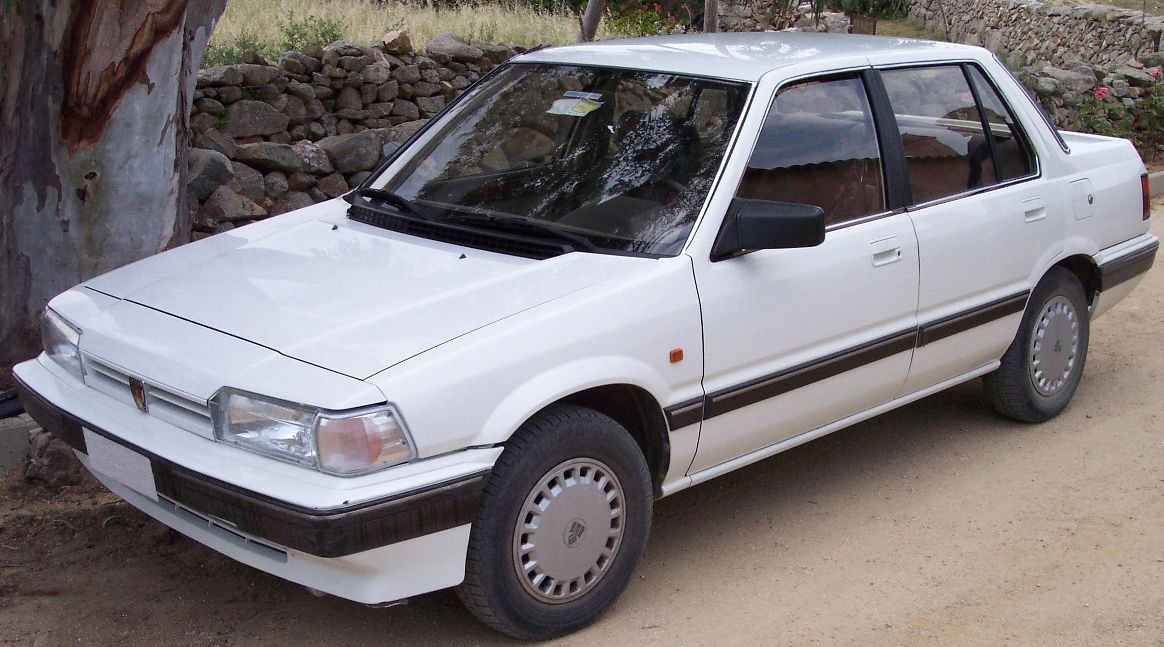
Rover 213SE

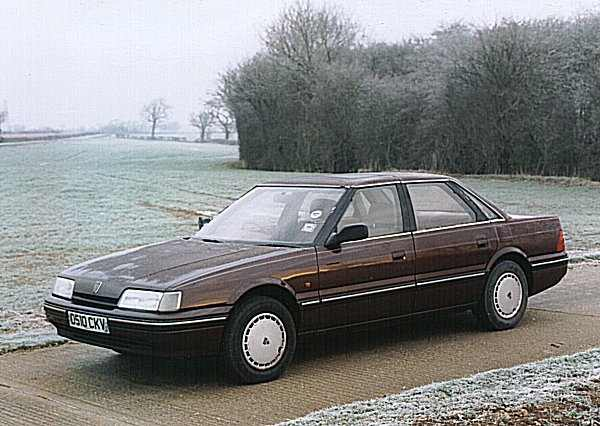
1986 Rover 820Si

Following the financial collapse of the British Leyland Motor Corporation (BLMC) in 1975 and the stark Ryder Report on the ailing firm, the resulting government bail-out and nationalisation saw the company being renamed British Leyland (BL). The car manufacturing subsidiary of BL became Leyland Cars, and later BL Cars Ltd, and it was this entity which ultimately became Austin Rover.

However, the huge industrial relations problems, ineffectual management and product duplication that had plagued the company up to the nationalisation continued throughout the late 1970s. The problems centered on Longbridge union leader and shop steward Derek Robinson (nicknamed "Red Robbo" by the British press). Robinson had assumed a greater level of control over BL's manufacturing base than any of its senior managers, and his network of union leaders in the various BL plants had the power to stop production if he had instructed them to do so.

The incumbent government of the time ran out of patience with Robinson, and appointed South African-born corporate troubleshooter Sir Michael Edwardes to turn BL around. His first task was to curb the large amount of power that the trade unions had over the company. After discovering Robinson's links with various communist groups, the company amassed sufficient evidence claiming that his actions were intended to deliberately damage both BL itself and the UK economy. As a result of this, he was dismissed in 1979. Secondly, Edwardes began a ruthless programme of factory closures and sell-offs. The biggest casualties of this were the MG assembly plant in Abingdon, and the Triumph plants in Speke (Liverpool) and Canley (Coventry). BL pulled out of entire markets – for example the large Leyland tractors range was sold-off wholesale to Marshall, and Jaguar was privatised in 1984. Many of BL's non-core subsidiaries (such as refrigerator company Prestcold and industrial engine manufacturer Coventry Climax) were also culled during Edwardes' tenure.

Thirdly, he entered into a collaborative agreement with Honda, the first product of this alliance being the Triumph Acclaim, which paved the way for the joint development of a range of cars which spearheaded the company's revival in the 1980s and 1990s. Lastly, the number of BL dealerships in the UK was trimmed down drastically.

The new, slimmer British Leyland was organised into a series of groups. Austin Rover handled the mass production of cars, with the smallest and cheapest models being sold under the Austin brand, while the more upmarket models carried a Rover badge. High performance version of the Austin hatchbacks and saloons made use of a revived MG badge. Light commercial vehicle production (4x4s and vans) was managed by the Land Rover Group, whilst full-size commercial vehicles were built by Leyland Trucks and Leyland Bus. The luxury manufacturer Jaguar was demerged from BL in 1984 and privatized, later taken over by Ford in 1989, and was ultimately reunited with former BL stablemate Land Rover in 2000 to form what is now Jaguar Land Rover.

Sales of Austin Rover products were reasonably strong, though not quite as high as the sales achieved by some of the earlier British Leyland products – the Maestro and Montego for instance did not sell as well as their predecessors, the Austin Allegro and Morris Marina, despite being fundamentally superior vehicles for their time. The Austin/MG Metro was regularly among the top five selling cars in Britain throughout the 1980s, and for two years in the early part of the decade it was the best selling supermini in Britain. The Metro, which was launched in 1980, gave the firm a much-needed competitor in modern supermini market and filled a gap in the range vacated by a scaling down of Mini and Austin Allegro production. At its peak in 1983, the Metro was Britain's third best selling car with more than 130,000 sales.

The Austin Maestro, launched in March 1983, was initially very popular, but sales dipped towards the end of the decade and in 1989 it was the 19th best selling new car in the UK with less than 40,000 sales, having peaked in 1984 at more than 80,000 sales as Britain's sixth best selling car. This was less of a problem thanks to the follow-up of the Triumph Acclaim with the first generation Rover 200 of 1984 – the second product of the Honda alliance and one of the few strong-selling small family saloons of its era. So in effect, Austin Rover was selling around 100,000 cars of this size every year in Britain during the mid to late 1980s, regaining its share of the sector after the scaling-down of Austin Allegro production from 1980. The similarly sized Austin Maxi had already been discontinued in 1981 to allow the Triumph Acclaim to take over its production lines.

The Austin Montego went on sale in April 1984 and sold well, being Britain's seventh best selling car in 1985 and 1986, though it was unable to match the sales success of the sector's established favourites – the Ford Sierra and Vauxhall Cavalier. The car had been in the pipeline since the late 1970s when the company's main competitors in this sector were the Morris Marina and Princess, but the Montego actually replaced the Morris Ital and Austin Ambassador which were the respective facelifted versions of those two cars.

Austin Rover's executive car, the Rover 800, was launched in July 1986 as the third product of its venture with Honda, sharing its development with the Honda Legend. This car also sold well, being a popular competitor for the likes of the Ford Granada and Vauxhall Carlton. It was also sold in America under the Sterling brand, but this project was quickly shelved due to unacceptable product quality issues that led to low sales.

Austin Rover's decision not to replace sports cars like the MG MGB and Triumph TR7 was justified by the fact that sports cars were no longer popular in the early 1980s, and many other manufacturers had also stopped – or were about to stop – production of sports coupes and roadsters. Buyers were instead being guided to "hot hatchbacks", following a trend set by the Volkswagen Golf GTI since 1976. By 1985, Austin Rover had launched a line-up of performance variants of its Metro and Maestro hatchbacks and the Montego saloon. These cars were badged as MG models and proved popular, especially in the form of the MG Metro. MG models accounted for approximately 10% of Metro, Maestro and Montego production between 1982 and 1991. The Rover Group continued production of the MG Metro until 1990 when it was replaced by the Rover Metro GTi. MG Maestro and Montego production continued at Cowley until 1991, when these models were discontinued to make way for the GTi variants of the Rover 200 and 400. However, the last Maestro and Montego models survived in production until December 1994, just before the 200 and 400 ranges – which had been expected to replace them – were themselves replaced.

=== Consolidation and renaming ===
In 1986, Austin Rover's parent company, BL plc, was renamed "Rover Group", and the truck and bus businesses were subsequently demerged and sold off to DAF and Volvo, respectively. The spare parts and logistics arm Unipart was also spun out in 1987. After an abortive attempt in 1988 to divest Land Rover to General Motors, the entire Rover Group was sold off by the British government in 1988 to British Aerospace. The car making subsidiary Austin Rover Group Ltd was renamed "Rover Group Ltd", which saw the effective disappearance of the Austin Rover name and brand, even though the Austin badging had been removed from the Mini, Metro, Maestro and Montego models after 1987. By 1991, all Austin Rover dealer signage had been changed to the new claret and beige "Rover" branding, and use of the old blue and green "chevron" logo had ceased, although it made sporadic appearances on the cars themselves (see below).

The combine now known as Rover Group remained in BAe ownership until January 1994, when it was sold to BMW. It remained in BMW ownership for six years before being sold to the "Phoenix Consortium" in May 2000, incorporating the MG and Rover marques and becoming MG Rover, which lasted five years before going bankrupt. The ownership of the Mini brand, however, remained in BMW ownership, as did ownership of the Cowley factory, which began production of an all-new Mini in the summer of 2001. Land Rover, meanwhile was sold to Ford, who had already purchased Jaguar in 1989.

MG production was revived in 2007 by new owner Nanjing Automobile, while the rights to use the Rover marque were purchased by Ford in 2006, only to be transferred to ownership of Indian carmaker Tata in 2008, as Tata also took over Land Rover and Jaguar to form Jaguar Land Rover. The Rover marque has yet to be revived more than a decade after its demise that was brought about by the collapse of MG Rover.

== Branding and logo ==
In 1968 British Leyland had created Austin Morris Ltd as an operating company that managed all the previous operations of the British Motor Corporation which it had absorbed, but it was not until 1978 that as part of Michael Edwardes' restructuring plan the Austin-Morris division was given a formal corporate identity (distinct from the Jaguar Rover Triumph (JRT) division of the company) with the blue "chevron" logo (officially known as the "wing"), which began appearing on Austin and Morris-badged BL cars in that year – the Princess 2 and the van/pick-up versions of the Morris Marina were the first vehicles to wear the logo, with the Allegro 3 and Maxi 2 following shortly after. However, this separate branding strategy was later abandoned and by 1983 the logo would be later expanded to represent virtually all of BL's marques - with each "slash" of the logo representing a marque - the blue section representing Austin and Morris, the green slashes for Rover, Triumph and originally Jaguar.

It eventually supplanted BL's own roundel logo (affectionately known as the "flying plughole" or "the plughole of despair") in the public domain, and would ultimately become the logo of the entire Austin Rover Group.

The ARG chevron officially remained in use until 1988, when ARG's rename and reprivatisation into the Rover Group saw it gradually disappear and replaced by Rover's historic "longship" logo. The Austin name was retired after 1987, however the chevron logo still appeared on the badging of the former Austin models, and the VIN plates of the cars still read "Austin Rover Group Ltd", since this was still the manufacturer's official name until 1989. For that model year the chevron logo was finally dropped in favour of a black silhouetted version of the Rover "longship" badge upon which the model name (Metro, Maestro, Montego) was applied, although with the exception of the reengineered R6 Metro of 1990, the Rover name was never officially used for these models.

One interesting anomaly from the ARG era is that the chevron logo was stamped into thousands of BL/Rover Group vehicle components, many of which survived on Rover and Land Rover models into the 21st century; indeed there are still some components – most notably on the Land Rover Defender until it finished production in 2016 – which still bear both it and some still even bear the older BL roundel logo.

A number of new models were in development at the time that Austin Rover Group ceased to exist – including the second generation Rover 200 Series, launched in October 1989 and the new Metro which was launched in May 1990.

== Timeline ==
- 1981: BL Cars Ltd is renamed Austin Rover Group Ltd.
- 1981: Launch of the Triumph Acclaim, successor of the Dolomite and rebadged version of the Japanese Honda Ballade, built in Cowley, Oxford.
- 1981: Demise of the Princess model range after nearly seven years in production.
- 1981: Production of the long-running Austin Maxi ends after 12 years.
- 1982: Launch of the Austin Ambassador, a facelifted version of the discontinued Princess.
- 1982: Michael Edwardes steps down as chairman and is replaced by Harold Musgrove. MG badge is relaunched, two years after being discontinued, on the MG Metro 1300. The Austin Allegro is discontinued after nine years in production.
- 1983: Launch of Austin Maestro, which replaces the defunct Allegro and Maxi ranges. The MG badge is used for the MG Maestro 1600 sports model. Austin Ambassador production ends in November.
- 1984: Launch of the second Honda-ARG joint venture car, the Mk1 Rover 200-series. It succeeds the Triumph Acclaim and in doing so spells the end of the Triumph marque.
- 1984: Launch of the Austin Montego as successor to the Morris Ital. This means the end of the Morris marque after 72 years. The MG Maestro 1600 is replaced by the MG Maestro 2.0 EFi. The Austin Metro receives a mild facelift and a five-door version is added to the range, an all-new model is planned to enter production by the end of the decade.
- 1985: Production begins at Cowley of the Honda Ballade, which is visually identical to the Rover 200 but uses some of its own engines and has a higher level of specifications. The MG version of the Montego goes on sale.
- 1986: Launch of the Rover 800-series, jointly developed with Honda and based on the Honda Legend; Rover SD1 production ceases after 10 years.
- 1986: BL renamed "Rover Group PLC"
- 1987: Unipart, ARG's spare parts brand is sold off via management buyout.
- 1987: The Austin marque is shelved, with the Metro, Maestro and Montego ranges now selling under just their model names. The Rover badge is not used on these cars in the UK market.
- 1988: Rover Group PLC sold by the British government to British Aerospace.
- 1988: A fastback version of the Rover 800 launches.
- 1989: Austin Rover Group is rebranded "Rover Group". Its final launch is the MG Maestro Turbo, powered by a 2.0 turbocharged engine and one of the fastest hatchbacks in the world with a top speed of nearly 130 mph (210 km/h). The Land Rover Discovery and the new Rover 200 Series enter production and launching around the time of the rebranding, with the Rover 200 Series and the new Rover Metro just months away from launch.

== See also ==
- Rover (marque)
- MG Rover
- British Leyland Motor Corporation
- Leyland Trucks
- Leyland Bus
