= Honda Civic (sixth generation) =

Sixth generation of Honda Civic

Honda Civic Sixth generation
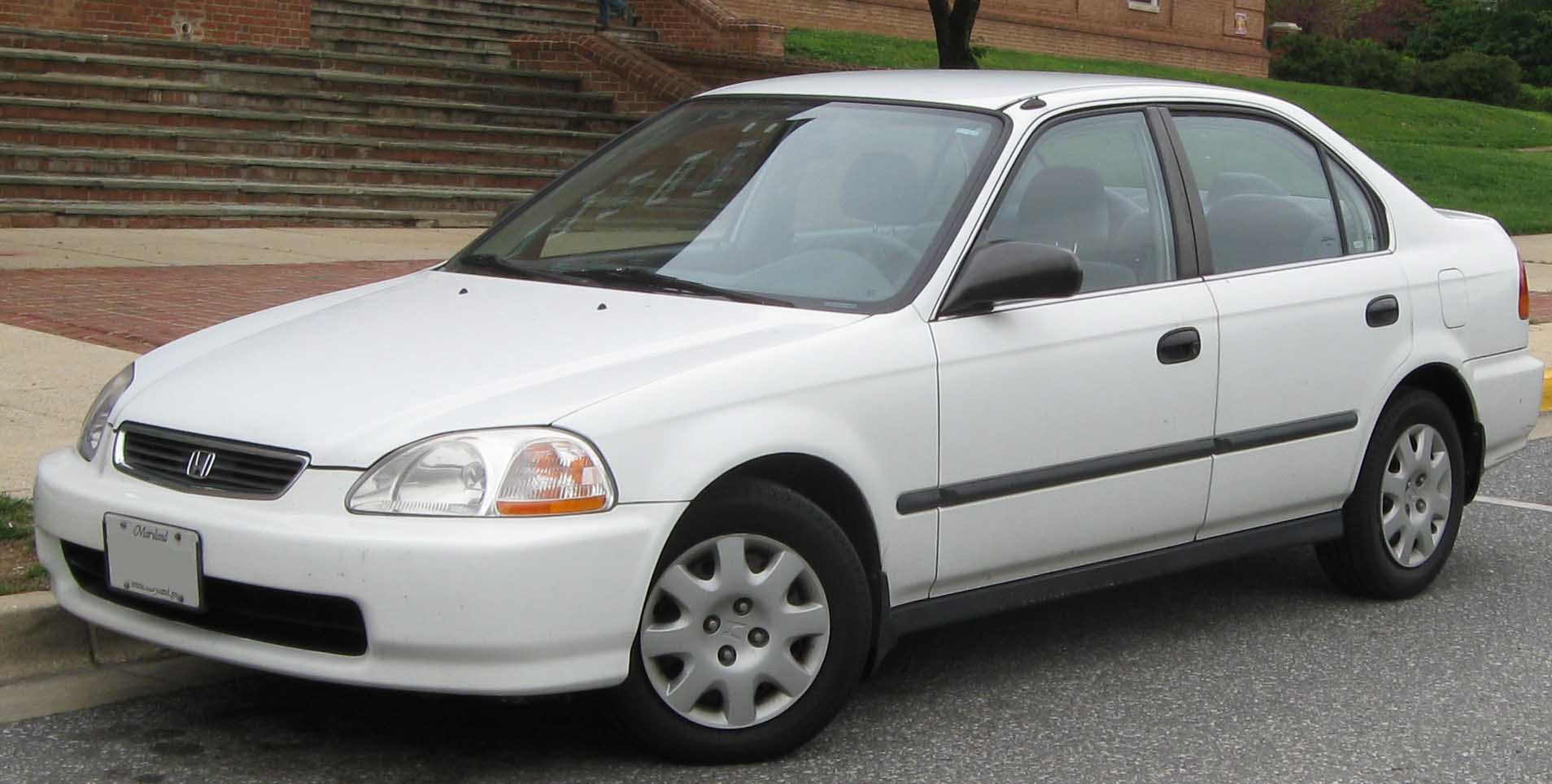
- 1998 Honda Civic LX

Overview
- Manufacturer: Honda
- Model code: EM (coupe); EK (sedan/hatchback); EJ (sedan/hatchback/coupe); MA; MB; MC (Aerodeck/Fastback 5dr)
- Also called: Honda Ballade (sedan, South Africa); Honda Civic Ferio (sedan, Japan, Malaysia & Indonesia); Yancheng YC7150 (China; JV); Xinkai HXK6360 (China; rebadged import)
- Production: September 1995 – August 2000
- Model years: 1996–2000
- Assembly: Swindon, United Kingdom (HUM); Suzuka, Japan; East Liberty, Ohio, U.S. (ELAP); Alliston, Ontario, Canada (HCM); Ayutthaya, Thailand; North Jakarta, Indonesia; Lahore, Pakistan (Honda Atlas); Aragua, Venezuela; Sumaré, Brazil (Honda Brazil); East London, South Africa (Mercedes-Benz South Africa); Hsinchu, Taiwan; Nelson, New Zealand (Honda New Zealand); Gebze, Turkey (Honda Gebze Plant); Santa Rosa City, Philippines (Honda Cars Philippines); Kuala Lumpur, Malaysia; Guangzhou, China
- Designer: Masakazu Udagawa; Yoshi Kigoyoshi (1993)

Body and chassis
- Class: Compact car
- Body style: 2-door coupé (EJ6/7/8/EM1); 3-door hatchback (EJ6/EK1/2/3/4/9); 4-door sedan (EJ6/8/9); 5-door liftback (Domani-based, MA/MB/MC); 5-door wagon (Orthia); 5-door wagon (Aerodeck; Domani-based)
- Layout: Front-engine, front-wheel-drive / four-wheel-drive
- Related: Honda Domani; Honda Integra SJ; Honda Orthia; Honda Partner; Acura EL; Isuzu Gemini; Isuzu Vertex; Rover 200; Rover 400

Powertrain
- Engine: petrol: 1.3 L D13B4 SOHC I4; 1.4 L D14A3/A4/A7/A8 SOHC I4; 1.5 L D15Z4/Z6 SOHC VTEC I4; 1.6 L D16Y4/Y5/Y7/Y8 SOHC VTEC I4; 1.6 L B16A2/B16B DOHC VTEC I4; 1.8 L B18A/B DOHC I4; diesel: 2.0 L 20T2N/T2R turbodiesel I4
- Transmission: 5-speed manual 4-speed automatic CVT - HX only

Dimensions
- Wheelbase: 2,620 mm (103 in)
- Length: 4,178 mm (164.5 in) (1995-98 hatchback); 4,171 mm (164.2 in) (1999–2000 hatchback); 4,450 mm (175 in) (coupé/sedan)
- Width: 1,704 mm (67.1 in) (Int'l); 1,695 mm (67 in) (Japan)
- Height: 1,374 mm (54.1 in) (coupé); 1,389 mm (54.7 in) (sedan)
- Curb weight: 1,008–1,185 kg (2,222–2,612 lb)

Chronology
- Predecessor: Honda Civic (fifth generation)
- Successor: Honda Civic (seventh generation)

The sixth-generation Honda Civic is an automobile produced by Honda from 1995 until 2000. It was introduced in 1995 with 3-door hatchback, 4-door sedan and 2-door coupe body styles, replicating its predecessor's lineup. The sixth-generation Civic offered two new 1.6-liter 4-cylinder engines and a new continuously variable transmission (CVT) on the HX model. The coupe and sedan are 2.3 in (58 mm) longer and the hatchback is 4.3 in (109 mm) longer than the previous-generation Civic. This was the last generation of Civic to have front double-wishbone suspension, as the succeeding seventh generation would change the front suspension to a MacPherson strut.

A 5-door hatchback was also on offer, replacing the Honda Concerto hatchback in Europe. This model utilized the same design language as the rest of the Civic range but was actually a hatchback version of the Honda Domani, sharing that car's platform which was derived from the previous-generation (EG/EH/EJ) Civic. The Domani replaced the sedan version of the Concerto in Japan while the sedan version of the Concerto was directly replaced by the sixth-generation Civic sedan in other markets. Two wagons were also made available; the JDM Orthia, based on the Civic sedan/3-door hatchback line, and a 5-door hatchback/Domani-based model for Europe, sold as the Civic Aerodeck. Neither type was offered in North America. The Civic 5-door hatchback also formed the basis for the 1995 Rover 400 although the 4-door sedan version of the Rover was quite distinct from the Domani. The sixth generation Civic was the first one where Honda made a dedicated version for the European market.

== Trim packages and equipment (North America) ==
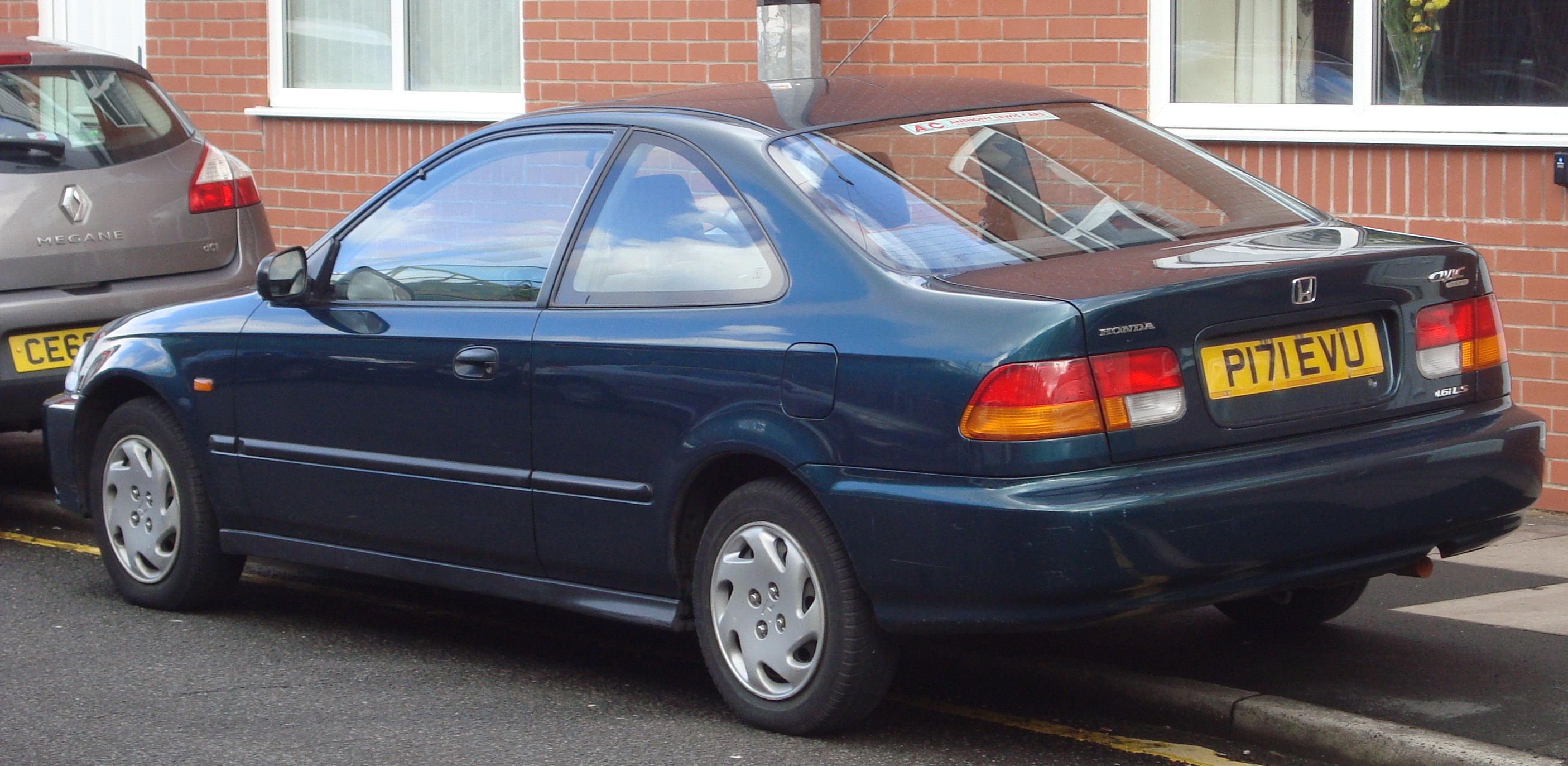
1996-1998 coupe (pre-facelift)

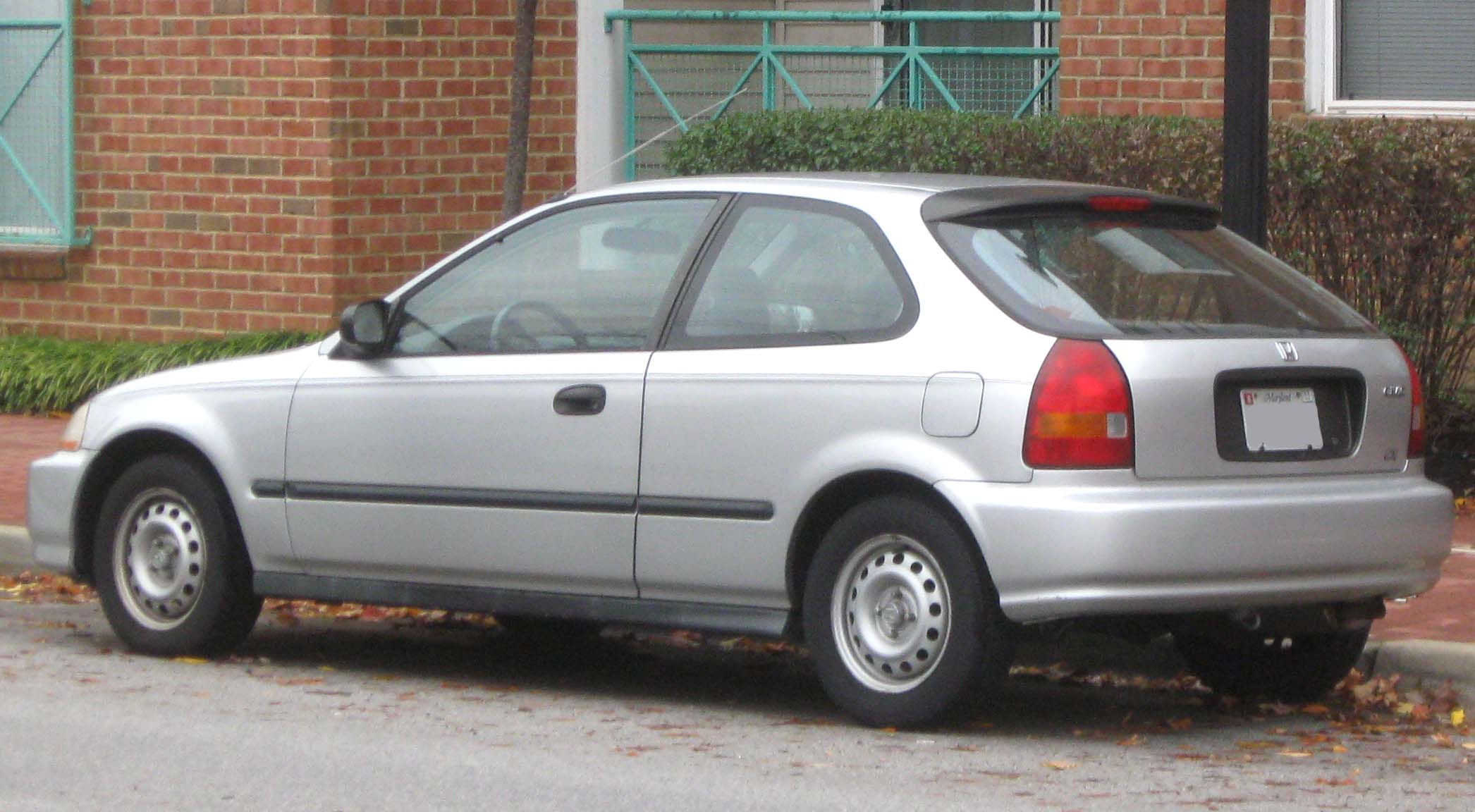
Hatchback (pre-facelift)

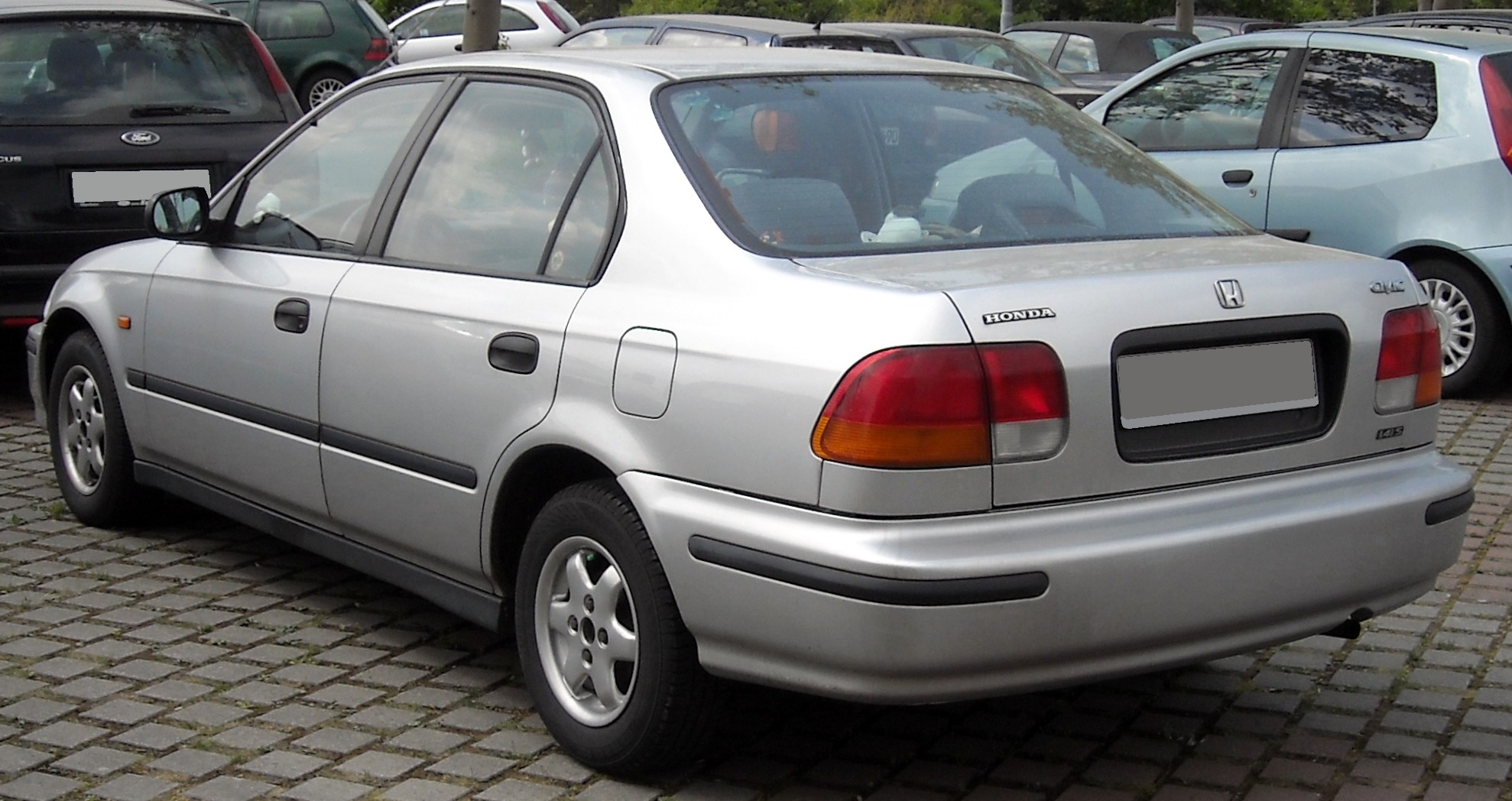
Sedan (pre-facelift)

CX: The base trim package, available as a hatchback only. Appointed sparingly, without radio or power steering, the CX included 13-inch wheels, 4-wheel double-wishbone suspension, dual airbags, split/folding rear seat, and seating for five. In 1997, the CX added 14-inch wheels as standard equipment. In 2000, the CX added tilt steering as standard equipment.

DX: Available as a hatchback, coupé, or sedan. DX models included all standard equipment from CX plus tilt steering and AM/FM high-power (4 x 20-watt) stereo with clock. Power steering was standard on all sedans, and on the coupes when ordered with automatic transmission. For 1997, the DX added 14-inch wheels as standard equipment.

LX: Available as a sedan only. LX models included all standard equipment from DX plus 14-inch wheels, power windows, power locks, power mirrors, power steering, front stabilizer bar, front center armrest with storage compartment, cargo area light, cruise control, and tachometer. For 1997, the LX added air conditioning as standard equipment.

HX: Available as coupé only, this trim package was specially tooled for higher fuel efficiency. The HX was available with a 5-speed manual transmission or with a CVT (continuously variable transmission) as a $1,000 option. The HX was the only trim package available with the CVT. It included all standard equipment from DX, plus a 115 hp (86 kW) VTEC-E 4-cylinder engine, 14-inch alloy wheels, power windows, power locks, power mirrors, power steering, a cargo-area light and a tachometer.

EX: Available as a coupé or sedan. EX models included all standard equipment from the LX plus a 1.6-liter SOHC VTEC 16-valve 4-cylinder D16Y8 engine producing 127 hp (95 kW), power moonroof, air conditioning, 6-speaker stereo (coupe only), cruise control, remote entry system, auto-down driver's window, plus body-colored side mirrors and side molding. ABS was standard on the sedan and optional on the coupe if equipped with an automatic transmission. For 1999, the EX added a CD player as standard equipment.

GX: Introduced in 1997 and available as a sedan for fleet-purchase only, this trim package was specially designed to run on natural gas. See Honda Civic GX for detail and references.

VP: Introduced in 1998 and available only as a sedan, this trim was designed as a “Value Package” above the DX. It included all standard equipment from DX plus an automatic transmission, power door locks, CD player, air conditioning, keyless entry, and special paint.

Si: The Civic Si returned to the lineup in 1999 (in Canada badged as an SiR), available only as a coupé. With the adoption of the VTi badge in Europe and the SiR and Type R badges in Japan for the sports variants of Civics, the Si became primarily a US-specific badge, a branding trend that would continue in subsequent Civic generations. Accelerating from 0-60 mph (97 km/h) in 7.1 seconds, the 1999 Civic Si featured a 1.6-liter DOHC VTEC B16A2 four-cylinder engine that made 160 hp (119 kW) at 8,000 rpm and 111 lb⋅ft (150 N⋅m) of torque at 7,000 rpm. While similar to the powerplant in the del Sol VTEC, the Civic Si saw some notable differences, which included a larger throttle body, improved intake manifold, strengthened connecting rods, low-friction/high-silicon pistons, a fully counterweighted crankshaft, and an exhaust system with larger-diameter piping. Due to its good fuel economy (27/31 city/hwy MPG), and a more popular coupe form, the trim package garnered a dedicated following in spite of its short production cycle.

Changes from the Civic EX included stiffer, progressive-rate springs, stiffer front and rear anti-roll bars, and a tower brace, which contributed to a flatter-cornering ride. It was available with a 5-speed manual transmission only, the exhaust-piping diameter was increased to 2 1/4 inches to reduce back pressure, standard equipment also included 4-wheel disc brakes. Aesthetic exterior changes from the LX/EX trims were minimal, with the Si trim package featuring a lower-profile and wider 15-inch wheel/tire package, a subtle chin-spoiler, painted side sills, and Si badging. The Si would only be available in three exterior colors: Electron Blue Pearl, Flamenco Black Pearl and Milano Red. There are power locks, power windows, a CD player, cruise control, air conditioning, power moonroof, and tilt steering. For the interior, the sixth-generation Civic Si also had tilt adjustment for the bottom cushion, a leather-wrapped steering wheel, remote keyless entry, and red-faced instrumentation with Si branding.

=== Canada ===
Canadian trim packages were mostly similar to the United States, though with different designations. Canadian Civic sedans came in LX and EX, which roughly correspond to the American DX and LX; there was no Honda-branded Canadian equivalent to the American EX sedan – the Canadian-market only Acura EL filled this spot. Canadian Civic coupes came in LX, Si, and SiR, the equivalent of the DX, EX, and Si in the United States. Only the EX sedan, Si coupe, and SiR coupe had power locks and power windows, the Si and SiR coupes were the only Canadian Civic trims with a power moonroof. All sedans and coupes had a group option package available that added air conditioning and anti-lock brakes. The hatchbacks, available only in CX and DX trims, were sold as economy cars; as in the US, they had none of the amenities of other trims in the Civic lineup, not even as options. All sedans, coupes, and the hatchback DX had dual front airbags; while the CX hatchback had the driver's side airbag only.

Canadian Si and SiR trims included ABS and heated mirrors. The Canadian SiR also was available in New Vogue Silver Metallic.

A Canadian SE sedan trim that slotted between the LX and EX was available for the 1999-2000 model years, which included all standard equipment from DX plus automatic transmission, power locks, CD player, air conditioning, and keyless entry.

The Civic DX Special Edition (SE) hatchback was a special trim package released for the model year 2000 only. The car was similar to the Canadian DX hatchback, but came with additional standard features including mesh 14-inch wheels (identical to an optional wheel in the Japanese market beginning with the previous generation of Civic, and similar in design to the common third generation 15-inch Integra mesh wheels), body-colored side mirrors and side mouldings, a mid-wing and a Special badge on the rear of the hatch.

== Facelift ==
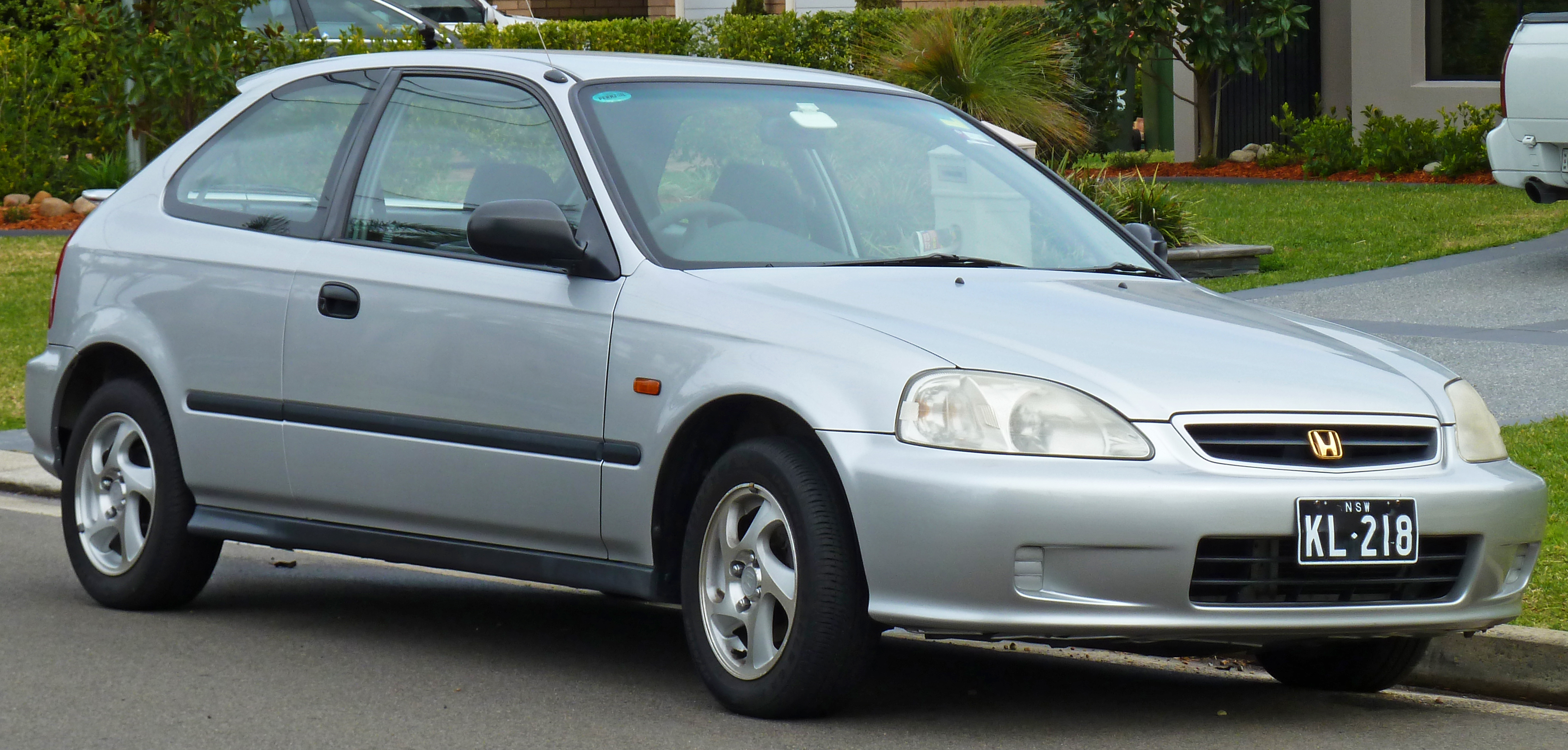

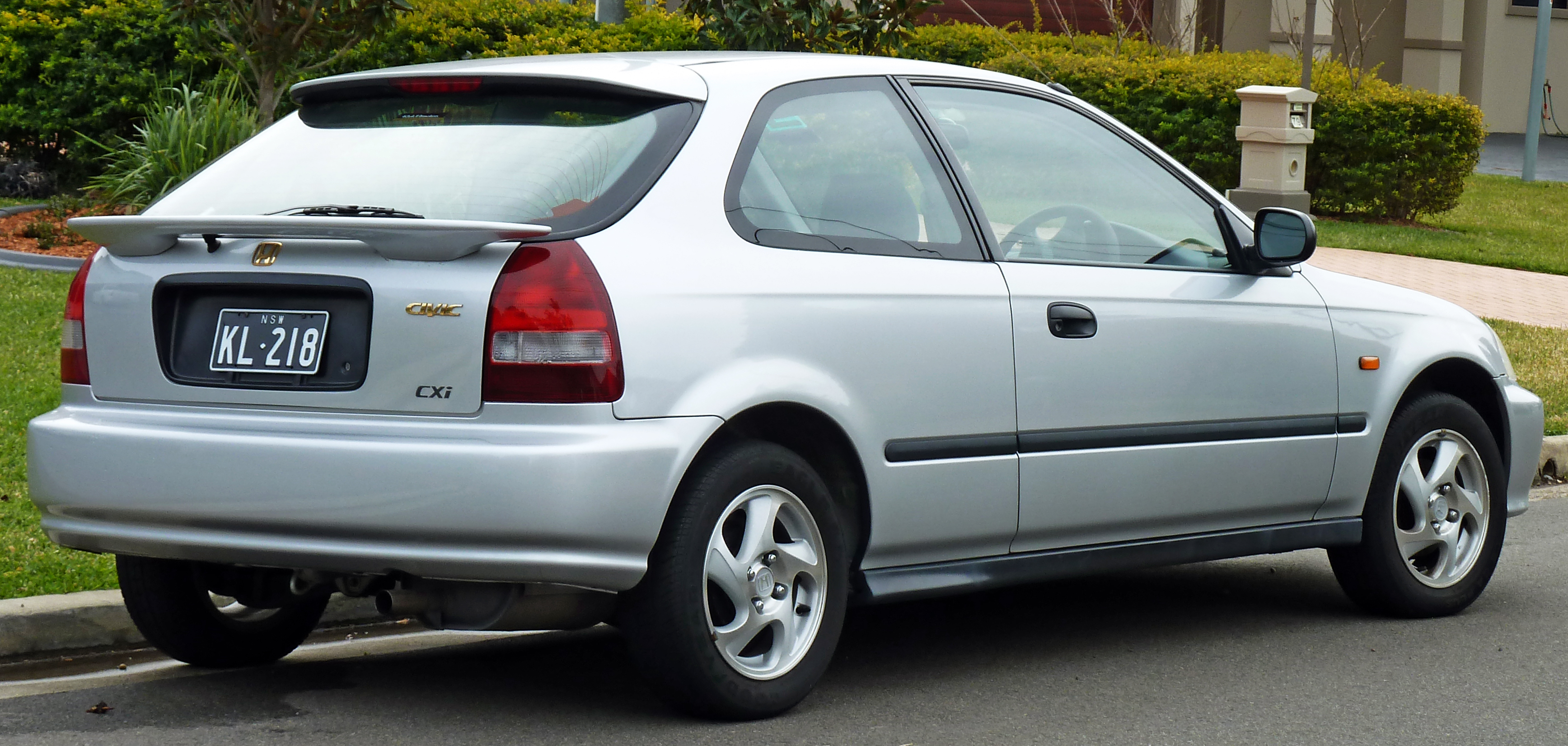
Australian-market hatchback (post facelift)

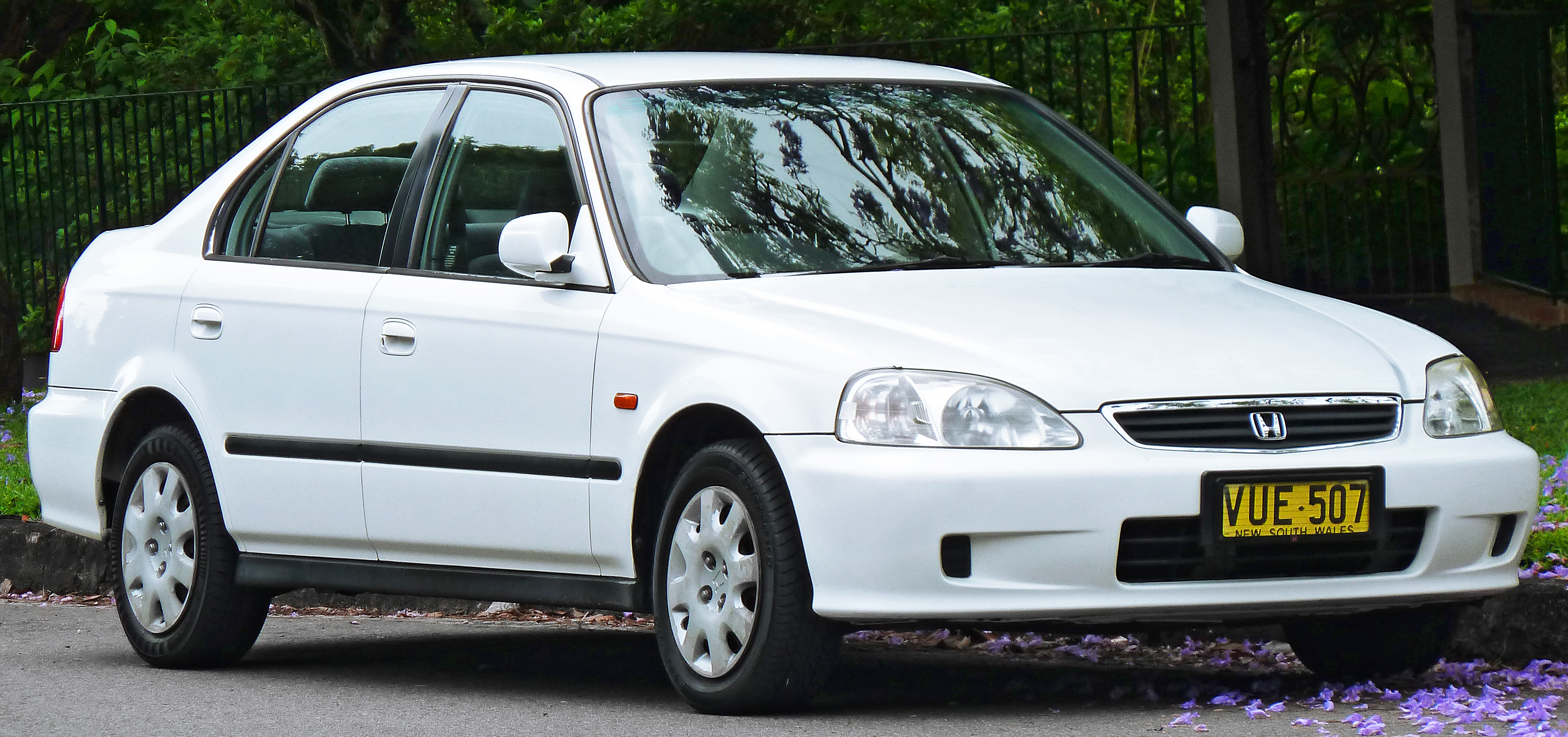

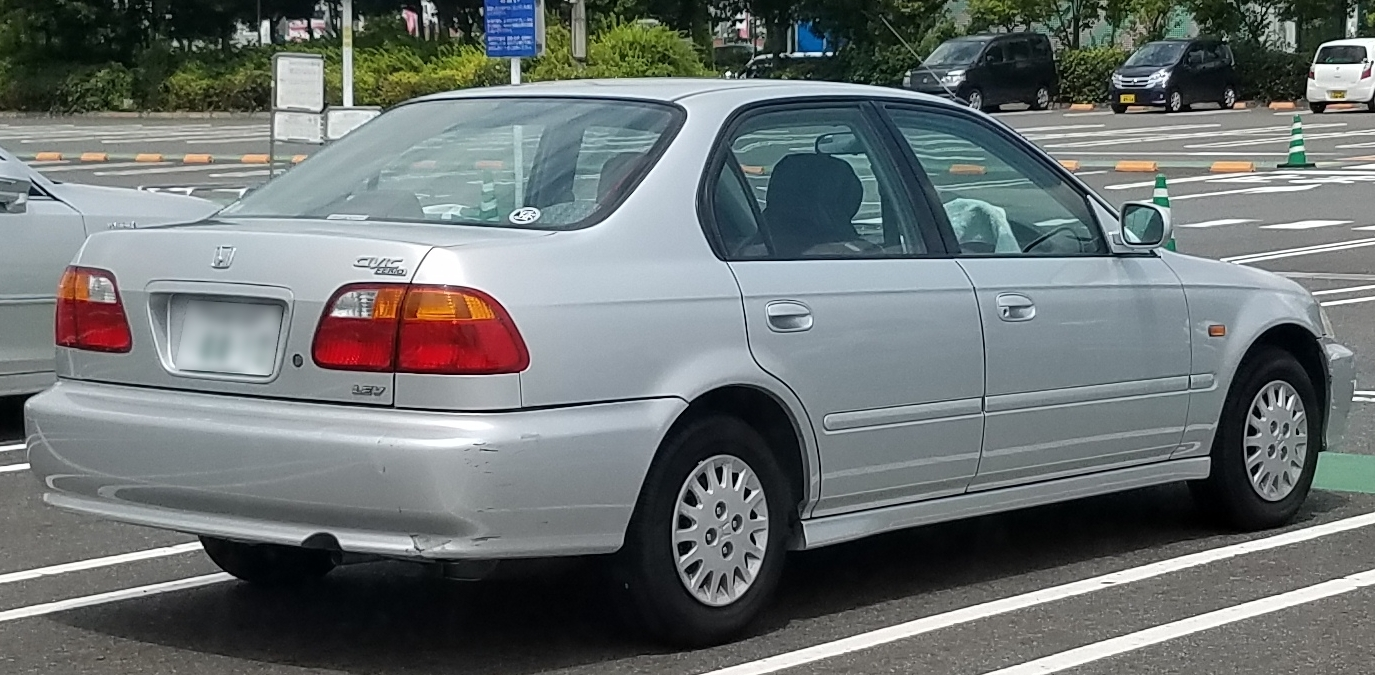
Sedan (post facelift)

In 1998, for the 1999 model year, the Civic received updates for both the interior and exterior.

The Civic received a facelift which included a new grille, new headlights, new front bumper, fenders and hood and redesigned taillights. The coupe and sedan models also received a slight redesign to the bottom of the rear bumper. On the pre-facelift sedans, the brake lights were on top of the reverse lights and turn signals; for the facelift version, the reverse and turn signals were on top of the brake lights. For the coupe and hatchback, the layouts remained as before; however, the rear turn signal lenses became clear/white instead of amber to match the reverse lights (the turn light bulbs themselves now were amber).

Inside, the center console had a makeover. The sliding HVAC controls were replaced by rotary knobs and relocated, which freed up space to accommodate an enlarged radio, which included the cassette player or Compact Disc player. Previously, the large size of the ventilation controls reduced the size of the radio, necessitating a slave cassette player or Compact Disc player at the bottom of the console.

These redesigns could vary according to the country of origin for the car. In some European countries there was no redesign to the climate control area or to the rear of the sedan models.

== Engines ==
=== Japan ===
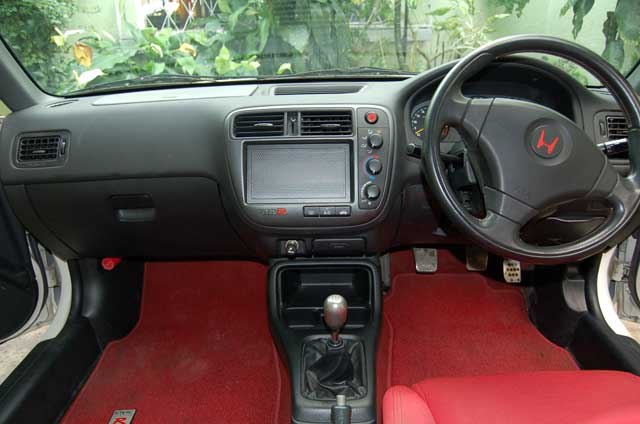
Type R interior

In Japan, the least expensive trim package was the EL (and also a short-lived special EL-II trim), powered by a 1,343 cc D13B engine with 91 PS (67 kW) at 6,300 RPM. As for most of the sixth-generation Civics, it was a SOHC 16-valve design.

In Japan, the Civic Ferio SiR used the second-generation B16A engine while the other trims used D15B, D16A or D13B engines.

=== United States ===
The CX, DX, VP and LX trim packages were equipped with the 1.6-liter SOHC 16-valve D16Y7 4-cylinder engine. It produced 106 hp (79 kW) at 6,200 RPM and 103 lb⋅ft (140 N⋅m) of torque at 4,600 RPM, with a compression ratio of 9.6:1. Fuel injection was multi-point.

The HX trim was equipped with the 1.6-liter SOHC VTEC-E 16-valve D16Y5 lean-burn 4-cylinder engine. It produced 115 hp (86 kW) at 6,300 RPM and 104 lb⋅ft (141 N⋅m) of torque at 5,400 RPM, with a compression ratio of 9.4:1. Fuel injection was multi-point.

The EX trim (Canadian Si trim) came equipped with the 1.6-liter SOHC VTEC 16-valve D16Y8 4-cylinder engine. It produced 127 hp (95 kW) at 6,600 RPM and 107 lb⋅ft (145 N⋅m) of torque at 5,500 RPM, with a compression ratio of 9.6:1. Fuel injection was multi-point.

The Si trim (Canadian SiR trim) used the 1.6-liter DOHC VTEC 16-valve B16A2 4-cylinder engine. It produced 160 hp (119 kW) at 7,600 RPM and 111 lb⋅ft (150 N⋅m) of torque at 7,000 RPM, with a compression ratio of 10.2:1. Fuel injection was multi-point.

The GX trim had the D16B5 engine designed to run on compressed natural gas. It had a compression ratio of 12.5:1.

=== Australia ===
in Australia, the CXi and GLi trims came with the D16Y4 engine across both hatchback and sedans; the VTi sedan trim had the D16Y5, the GLi coupe the D16Y7, the VTI coupe the D16Y8 and the VTi-R EK4 Hatchback and Coupe had the B16A2 engine.

=== Other markets ===
In the UK, Europe, and South Africa, there were a number of sedans and Aerodecks between 1996 and 2000 produced with the B16A1, B16A2, B18B and even B18C motors.

In the European and UK market, the lowest end models, the 1.4i (available up until 1998) and 1.4iS, were equipped with various configurations of the D14A (for those before 1998) and D14Z (for those after 1998) engine, with respectively 75hp and 90hp for each trim.

Some of the sedans and Aerodecks offered in the European market were equipped with the Rover derived 20T2R (86hp) and 20T2N (105hp) 2.0l I4 Turbo Diesel engines.

The Russian market 1.4l sedans were equipped with the D14A6, which offered higher torque and a lower compression ratio compared to the European market D14 engines.

In the Middle East market, the Civic came with a 105 PS (77 kW) D15Z4 engine for LXi and EXi trims.

== Transmissions ==
Most trim packages (DX, LX, EX) were available with a standard 5-speed manual transmission with a hydraulic clutch, or an optional 4-speed automatic transmission. The Si however was only available with a 5-speed manual transmission. Various gear sets and final drives were used between trims and model years.

The HX trim was offered with the 5-speed manual or a CVT Continuously Variable Transmission which offered three driving ranges, D (standard transmission ratios for normal driving), S (secondary ratios for spirited driving with higher engine speeds), and L (lowest ratios to provide maximum engine braking and peak power). The conventional 4-speed automatic was not available on the HX trim. A JDM variant called the Civic RTi was also produced and it featured either manual and automatic transmissions coupled to a Honda real-time all-wheel-drive layout.

== Colors and trim ==
Sixth-generation Civics came in as many as ten different exterior colors (Note: Nine colors were available from 1996-1998 but a 10th exterior color was added to the Si model beginning in 1999.) and available color options changed during the mid-cycle refresh in 1999. Interior trim was dictated based on the exterior color and trim package selected. Some models had as few as three exterior choices while other models had as many as six exterior colors.

Colors available in the US were as follows:

1996: Cyclone Blue Metallic (sedan), Cypress Green Pearl (coupe and sedan), Midori Green Pearl (hatch), Granada Black Pearl (hatch, coupe), Frost White (coupe and sedan), New Vogue Silver Metallic (hatch), Milano Red (coupe), Island Coral Pearl (coupe and sedan) and Roma Red (hatch).

1997: Cyclone Blue Metallic (DX and LX sedan), Cypress Green Pearl (DX and EX coupe and sedan), Granada Black Pearl (LX and EX sedan, coupe and DX hatch) Frost White (DX and EX coupe and sedan), New Vogue Silver Metallic, Dark Amethyst Pearl (hatch), Milano Red (coupe), Inza Red Pearl (LX sedan) and Roma Red (hatch).

1998: Cyclone Blue Metallic (sedan), Cypress Green Pearl (coupe and sedan), Taffeta White (coupe and sedan), New Vogue Silver Metallic, Flamenco Black Pearl, Dark Amethyst Pearl (hatch), Milano Red (coupe) and Roma Red (hatch).

1999: Electron Blue Pearl (Si coupe only), Iced Teal Pearl (sedan), Clover Green Pearl (coupe and sedan), Taffeta White (coupe and sedan), New Vogue Silver Metallic (hatch), Flamenco Black Pearl(hatch and coupe), Dark Amethyst Pearl (hatch), Milano Red (coupe) and Roma Red (hatch).

2000: Electron Blue Pearl (Si coupe only), Iced Teal Pearl (sedan), Clover Green Pearl (coupe and sedan), Taffeta White (coupe, hatch and sedan), New Vogue Silver Metallic, Flamenco Black Pearl, Milano Red (coupe), Roma Red (hatch), Vintage Plum Pearl (sedan) and Titanium Metallic (sedan).

== Weights ==
	CX Hatch		DX Hatch		DX Coupe		HX Coupe		EX Coupe	
	Auto	Manual	Auto	Manual	Auto	Manual	Auto	Manual	Auto	Manual
1996	2,297 lb (1,042 kg)	2,222 lb (1,008 kg)	2,317 lb (1,051 kg)	2,242 lb (1,017 kg)	2,339 lb (1,061 kg)	2,262 lb (1,026 kg)	no data	2,313 lb (1,049 kg)	2,513 lb (1,140 kg)	2,483 lb (1,126 kg)
1997	2,304 lb (1,045 kg)	2,238 lb (1,015 kg)	2,319 lb (1,052 kg)	2,253 lb (1,022 kg)	2,271 lb (1,030 kg)	2,337 lb (1,060 kg)	2,399 lb (1,088 kg)	2,324 lb (1,054 kg)	2,496 lb (1,132 kg)	2,460 lb (1,116 kg)
1998	2,357 lb (1,069 kg)	2,295 lb (1,041 kg)	2,392 lb (1,085 kg)	2,339 lb (1,061 kg)	2,385 lb (1,082 kg)	2,342 lb (1,062 kg)	2,429 lb (1,102 kg)	2,361 lb (1,071 kg)	2,551 lb (1,157 kg)	2,504 lb (1,136 kg)
1999	2,423 lb (1,099 kg)	2,359 lb (1,070 kg)	2,434 lb (1,104 kg)	2,388 lb (1,083 kg)	2,405 lb (1,091 kg)	2,335 lb (1,059 kg)	2,445 lb (1,109 kg)	2,370 lb (1,075 kg)	2,560 lb (1,161 kg)	2,513 lb (1,140 kg)
2000	2,423 lb (1,099 kg)	2,359 lb (1,070 kg)	2,434 lb (1,104 kg)	2,388 lb (1,083 kg)	2,405 lb (1,091 kg)	2,359 lb (1,070 kg)	2,445 lb (1,109 kg)	2,370 lb (1,075 kg)	2,560 lb (1,161 kg)	2,513 lb (1,140 kg)

	DX Sedan		LX Sedan		EX Sedan		Si Coupe	Value Package Sedan
	Auto	Manual	Auto	Manual	Auto	Manual	Manual	Auto
1996	2,370 lb (1,075 kg)	2,319 lb (1,052 kg)	2,430 lb (1,102 kg)	2,387 lb (1,083 kg)	2,568 lb (1,165 kg)	2,518 lb (1,142 kg)		
1997	2,319 lb (1,052 kg)	2,370 lb (1,075 kg)	2,387 lb (1,083 kg)	2,438 lb (1,106 kg)	2,568 lb (1,165 kg)	2,518 lb (1,142 kg)		
1998	2,385 lb (1,082 kg)	2,339 lb (1,061 kg)	2,458 lb (1,115 kg)	2,412 lb (1,094 kg)	2,558 lb (1,160 kg)	2,511 lb (1,139 kg)		
1999	2,388 lb (1,083 kg)	2,339 lb (1,061 kg)	2,456 lb (1,114 kg)	2,410 lb (1,093 kg)	2,562 lb (1,162 kg)	2,513 lb (1,140 kg)	2,612 lb (1,185 kg)	
2000	2,388 lb (1,083 kg)	2,339 lb (1,061 kg)	2,456 lb (1,114 kg)	2,410 lb (1,093 kg)	2,562 lb (1,162 kg)	2,513 lb (1,140 kg)	2,612 lb (1,185 kg)	2,418 lb (1,097 kg)

== Worldwide ==
=== Japan ===
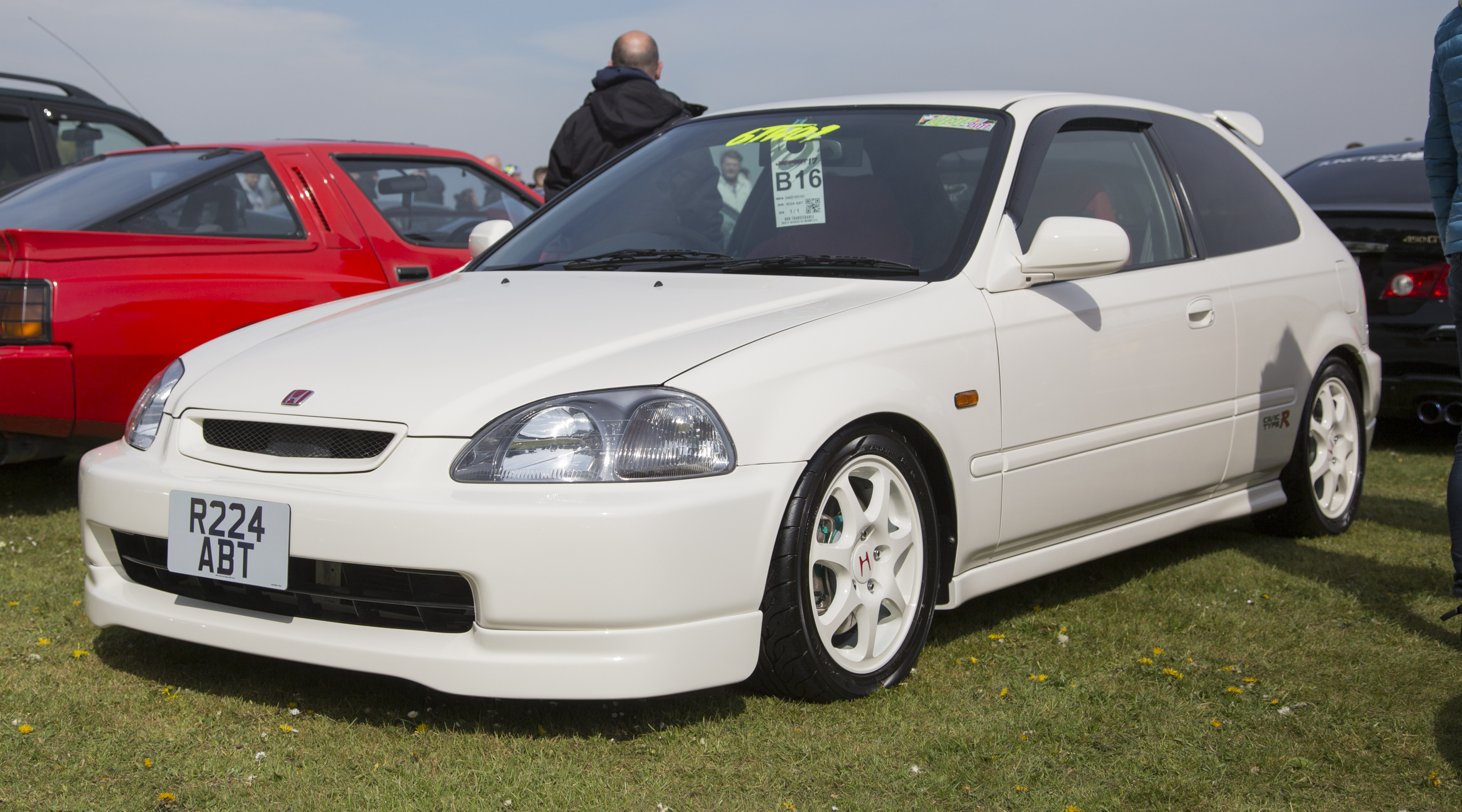
Honda Civic Type R

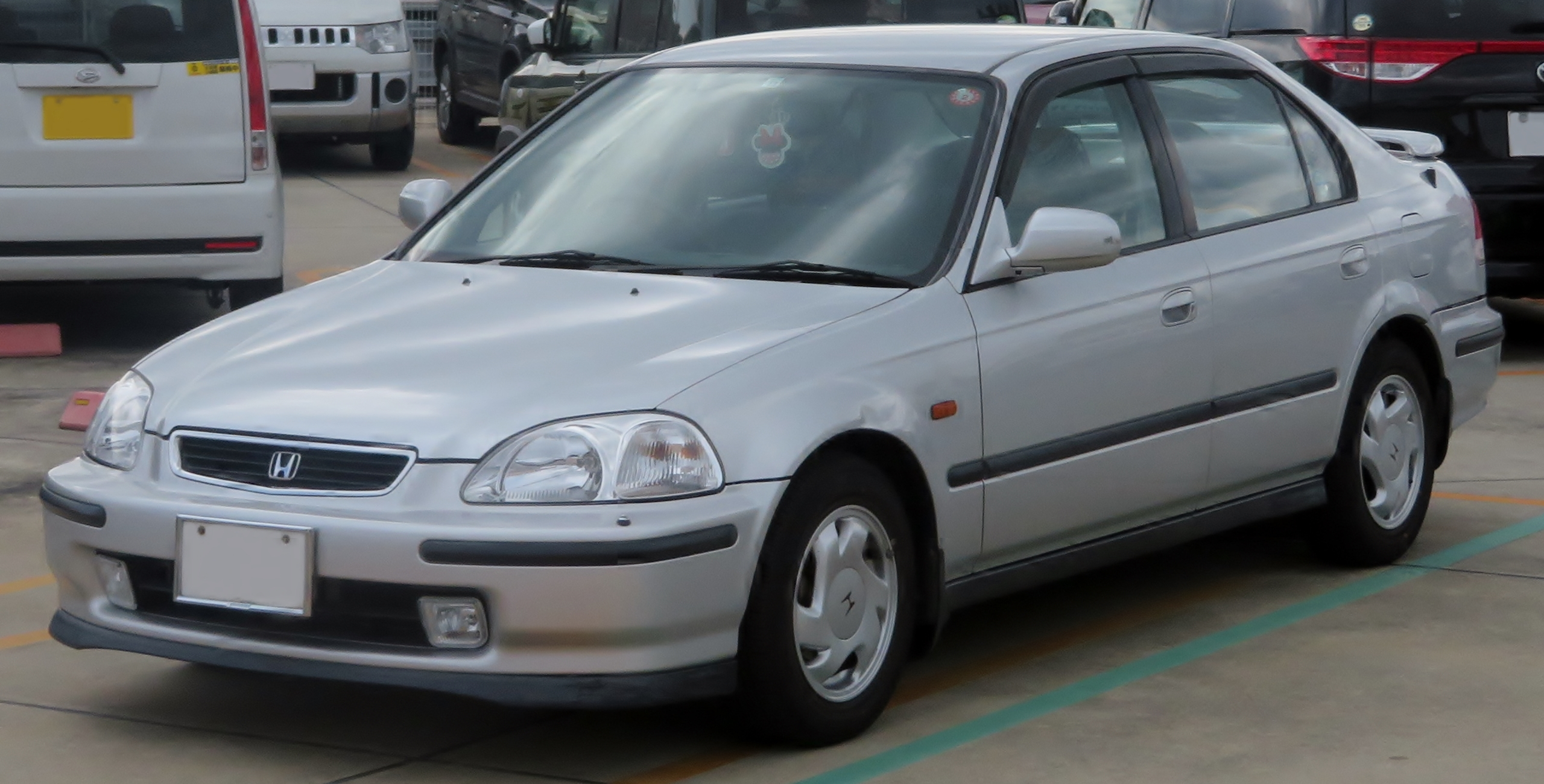

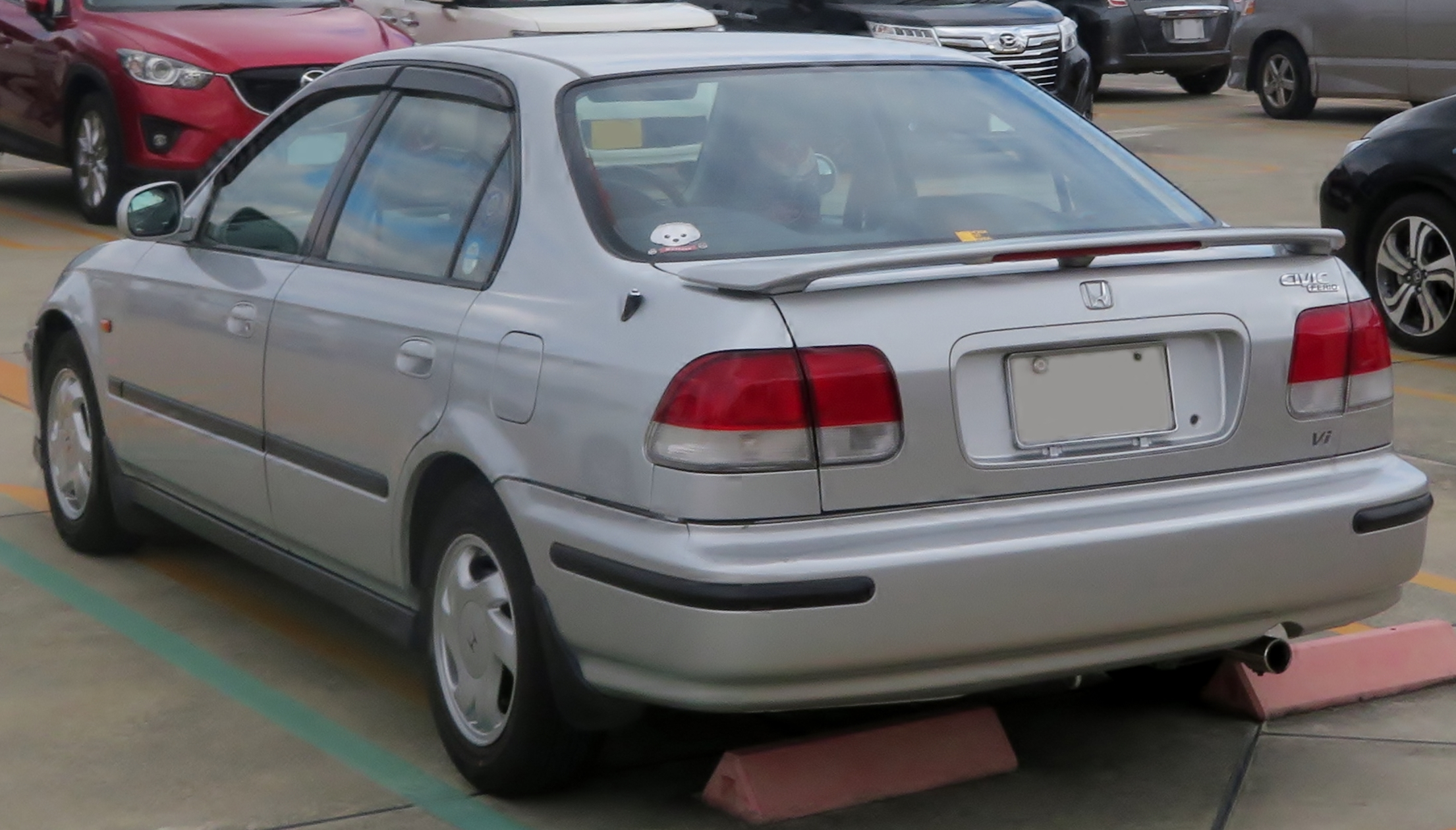
Honda Civic Ferio Vi (EK3, Japan)

The JDM Civic Sedan (known as the Civic Ferio Si) featured a 170 PS (125 kW; 168 hp) 1.6-liter DOHC VTEC B16A 4-cylinder engine, rear headrests, an Integra Type-R style shift knob, unique seating fabric and the same 15-inch alloy wheels that also appeared on the 1999–2000 US market Civic Si Coupé. Other JDM Ferio models included a model with the RealTime 4-wheel drive and a rear wiper on the sedan, which was not seen in other markets.

==== Civic Type R ====
In 1997, the Honda Civic Type R was introduced. The Civic Type R was sold only in the Japanese domestic market and only available as a hatchback with a 5-speed manual transmission with a helical-type limited-slip differential. This model was equipped with a hand-built 1.6-liter DOHC VTEC B16B 4-cylinder engine producing (185 PS (136 kW; 182 hp) at 8,200 rpm) (AKA PCT), which is essentially a destroked version of the B18C engine from the Integra Type R. The B16B engine featured a hand-polished cylinder head, lighter flywheel, redesigned cam profiles, high-compression pistons and balanced crankshaft. The chassis was given the designation EK9. The EK9 was unique as it was based on the JDM EK4 SiR but taken out of the production line and given additional reinforcement to the chassis and body shell. Weight was also meticulously removed to create a lightweight racecar feel. Other additions were larger brakes, 5-stud wheel hubs, quicker steering ratio, specially tuned suspension, Recaro seats, MOMO steering wheel, titanium shift knob, front lip spoiler, rear wing, and smoked headlights.

==== Civic Ferio Vi-RS ====
Considered as the "extra sporty" version of the Honda Civic Ferio, the Honda Civic Ferio Vi-RS 1.5-liter, 4-door sedan was sold in the Japanese domestic market only. It has the 1.5-liter D15B three-stage VTEC 4-cylinder engine, a CVT or a 5-speed manual transmission. The Civic Vi-RS had a three-way switch installed on the right side of the steering wheel marked D, S1, or S2. These settings affected which cam was used, the ECU's air-fuel mapping, and gearbox behaviour (on CVT). S2 was the sportiest mode.

=== Australia ===
The Civic was introduced in 1996 initially with two 1.6-liter engines; the 1.6-liter SOHC VTEC D16Y8 4-cylinder engine producing 95 kW (127 hp) was found in the VTI coupe (EJ8), while the 1.6-liter SOHC D16Y4 4-cylinder engine producing 88 kW (118 hp) was standard across the range in the GLi and CXi models (EK1), with an optional 4-speed automatic transmission in both the CXi and GLi or CVT in the VTi. The high output 118 kW (158 hp) 1.6-liter DOHC VTEC B16A2 4-cylinder engine was introduced later and available in the EK4 hatchback, known as the VTi-R. In 2000, the Vti-R body was no longer available as a EK4 hatchback and instead sold as the EM1 2-door coupe.

==== Indy Special ====
Also available in Australia was a special edition yellow version of the EK1 civic called the Indy Special. The name was inspired by Indy car racing.

=== Asian SiR-II ===
From 1996 until 2000, Honda produced the Civic SiR-II which came with a B16A, B16A5 and B16A6 engine, but it was only available in Asian market. This engine produced 160 PS (118 kW; 158 hp) at 7,800 rpm and 175 PS (129 kW; 173 hp) with a displacement of 1,595 cc.

=== Philippines ===
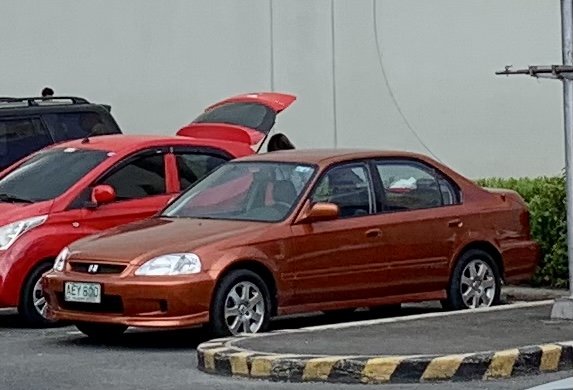
A Honda Civic SiR in Passion Orange (Philippines)

The sixth-generation Civic was initially launched in 1996 with two trim packages: the LXi with a 1.5-liter SOHC PH15 (D15Z4) four-cylinder engine, and the VTi with a 1.6-liter SOHC PH16A (D16Y8) VTEC 4-cylinder engine. Both came with front disc brakes and rear drum brakes. Transmission choices were a 5-speed manual or a 4-speed automatic, available in both trims. With the 1999 facelift, an SiR version was introduced. It came with a P6ZD1 (B16A2) 1.6L DOHC VTEC 4-cylinder engine and was initially available in Nighthawk Black, Tafetta White and Passion Orange variants. Formula Red and Sunburst Yellow color variants followed afterwards with silver accents on the center console. Other notable differences were a mesh grille (similar with the EK9), three-spoke red-stitched steering wheel, 15-inch Enkei alloy wheels (similar to the USDM Si & JDM Vi-RS), leather-stitched shift knob (similar to the JDM SiR), front upper strut bar, Kenwood CD player, bigger front and rear disc brakes, unique interior fabric colors and an optional front chin and spoiler. The only transmission available was a 5-speed manual.

=== South Africa ===
In South Africa, the 3-door hatchback was sold under the "Civic Coupe" (pre-facelift) and "Civic" (facelift) nameplates. The 4-door sedan was marketed under the "Ballade" nameplate. The Type R and the 2-door Civic coupe (Si) was not available. Chassis codes also differed to other markets: SO3 (civic hatchback) and SO4 (Civic sedan/Ballade). South African model options were Civic 150i (D15Z4), Civic 160i (D16Y9), Civic VTEC (B16A6), Ballade 150i (D15Z4), Ballade 160i (D16Y9), Ballade 180i (B18B4) and Ballade VTEC (B16A6). The VTEC model Civic and Ballade were the highest specification model one could purchase at the time. Leather seats, electric power windows and better performance all came with the VTEC models (Civic or Ballade). As Honda were manufactured and distributed by Mercedes Benz South Africa at the time, many models used some Mercedes trim, such as their leather trim and alarm system on the Ballade and Civic VTEC models. An AMG option was available and later a Sport version Ballade was also released featuring a performance exhaust system, Type R style gearshift knob and AMG badges and different paint styles.

=== European-market / Civic Aerodeck ===
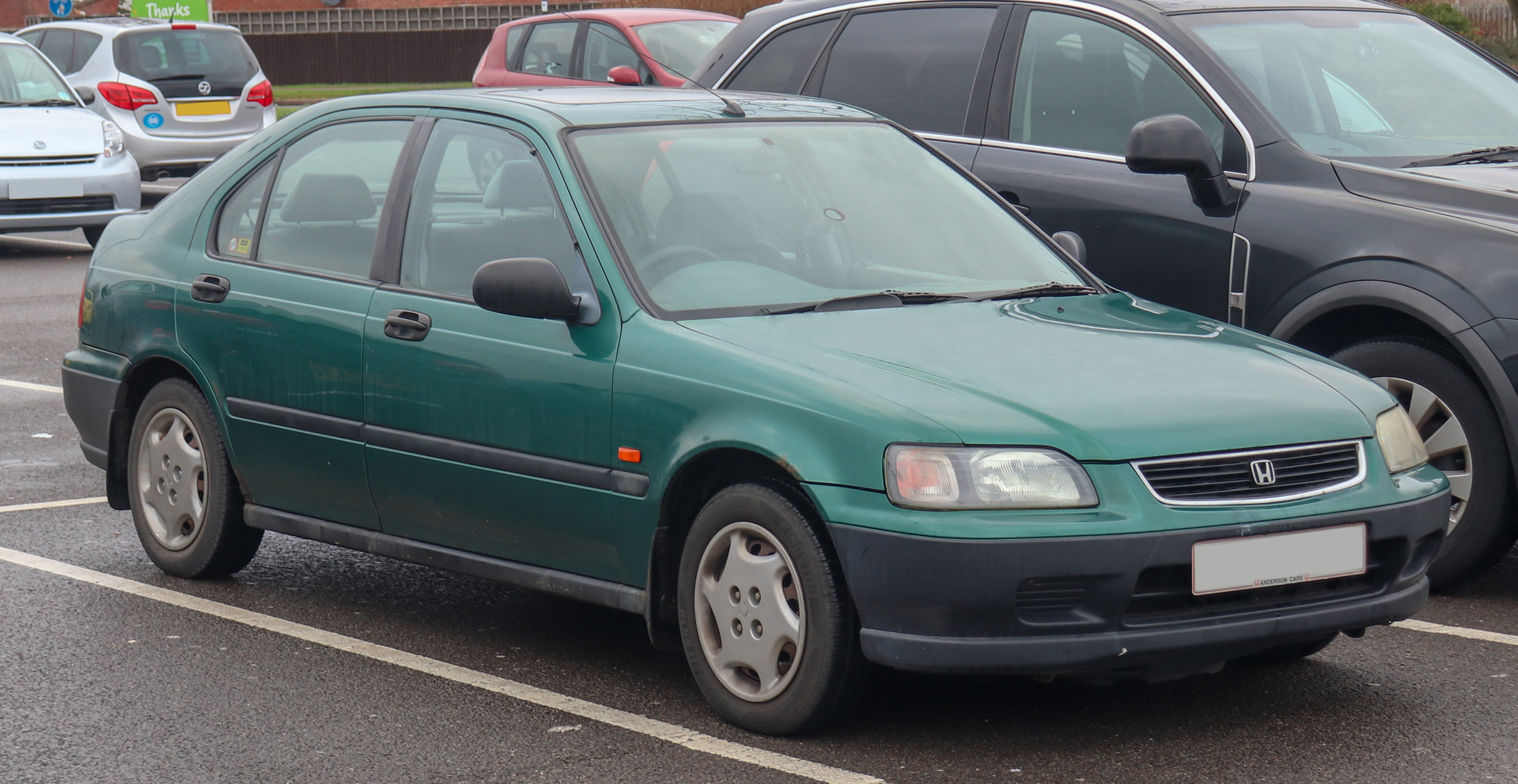

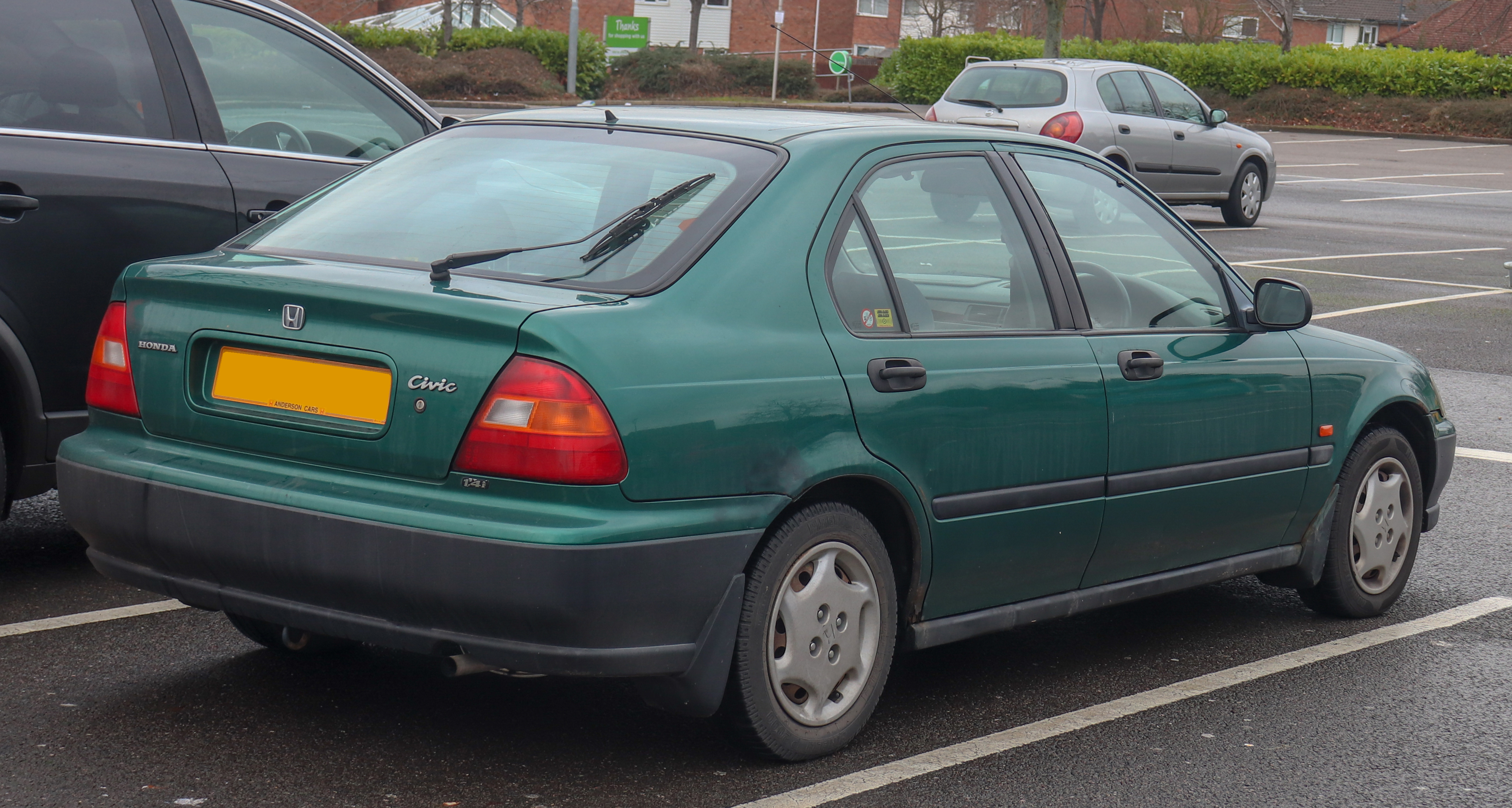
The European Honda Civic 5-door liftback (rebadged Domani)

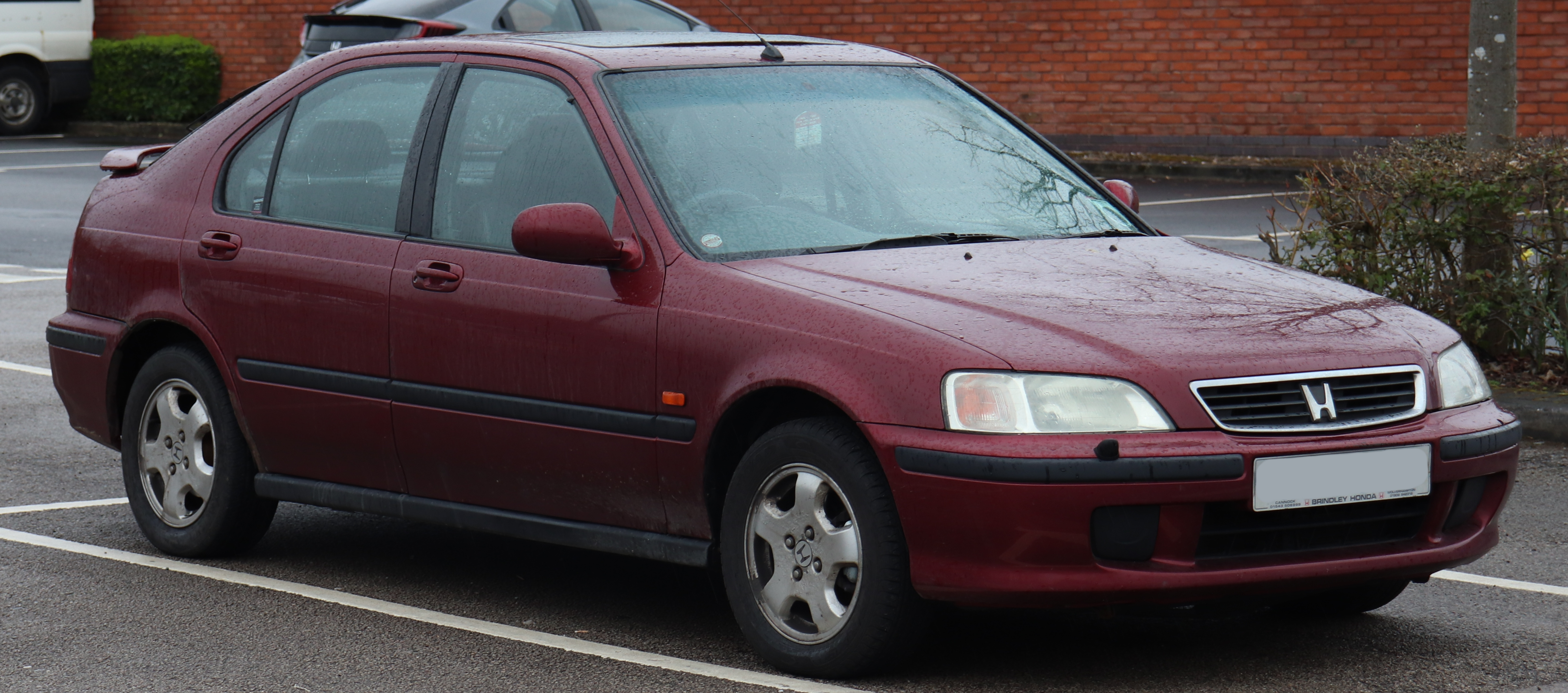

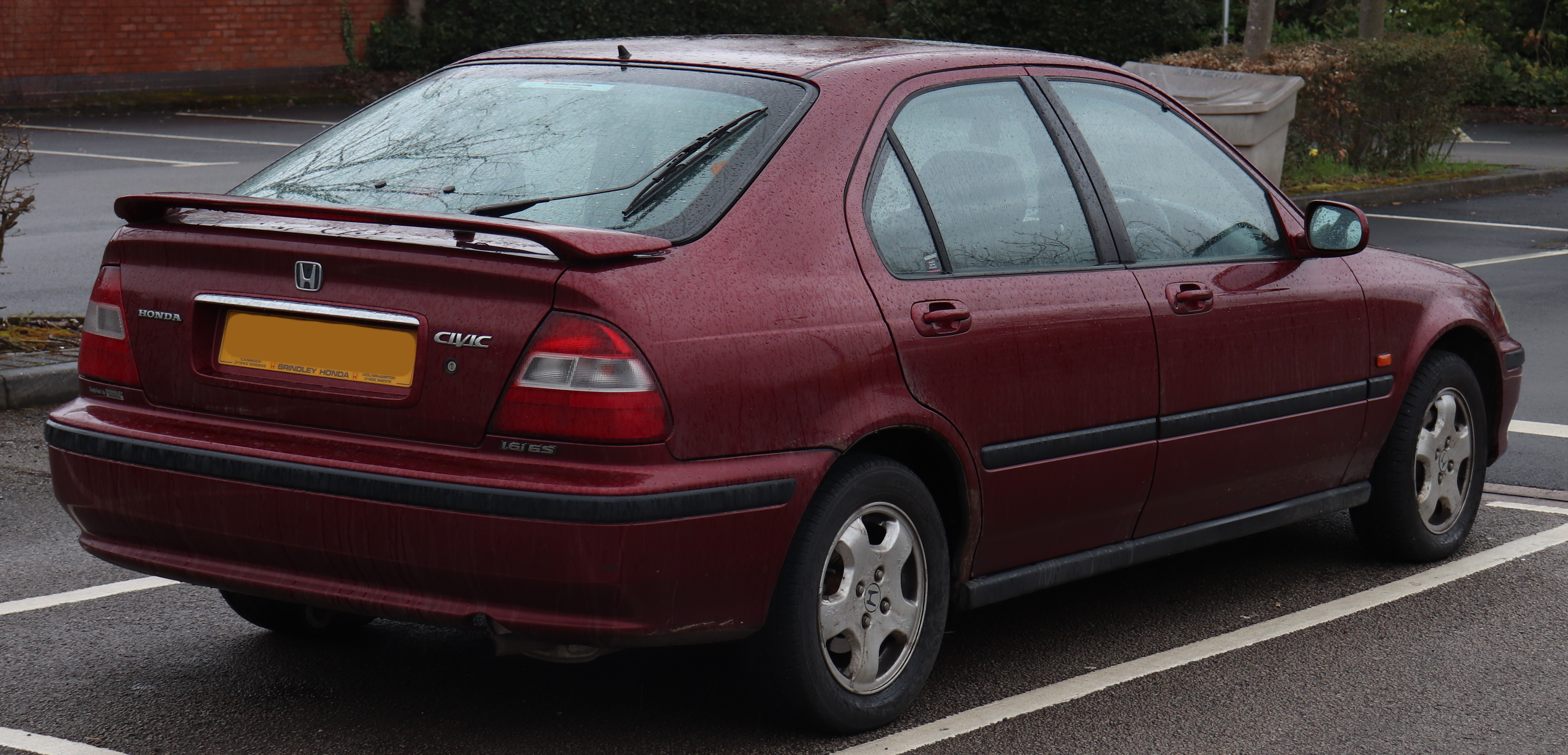
1997 Honda Civic ES 1.6 (UK)

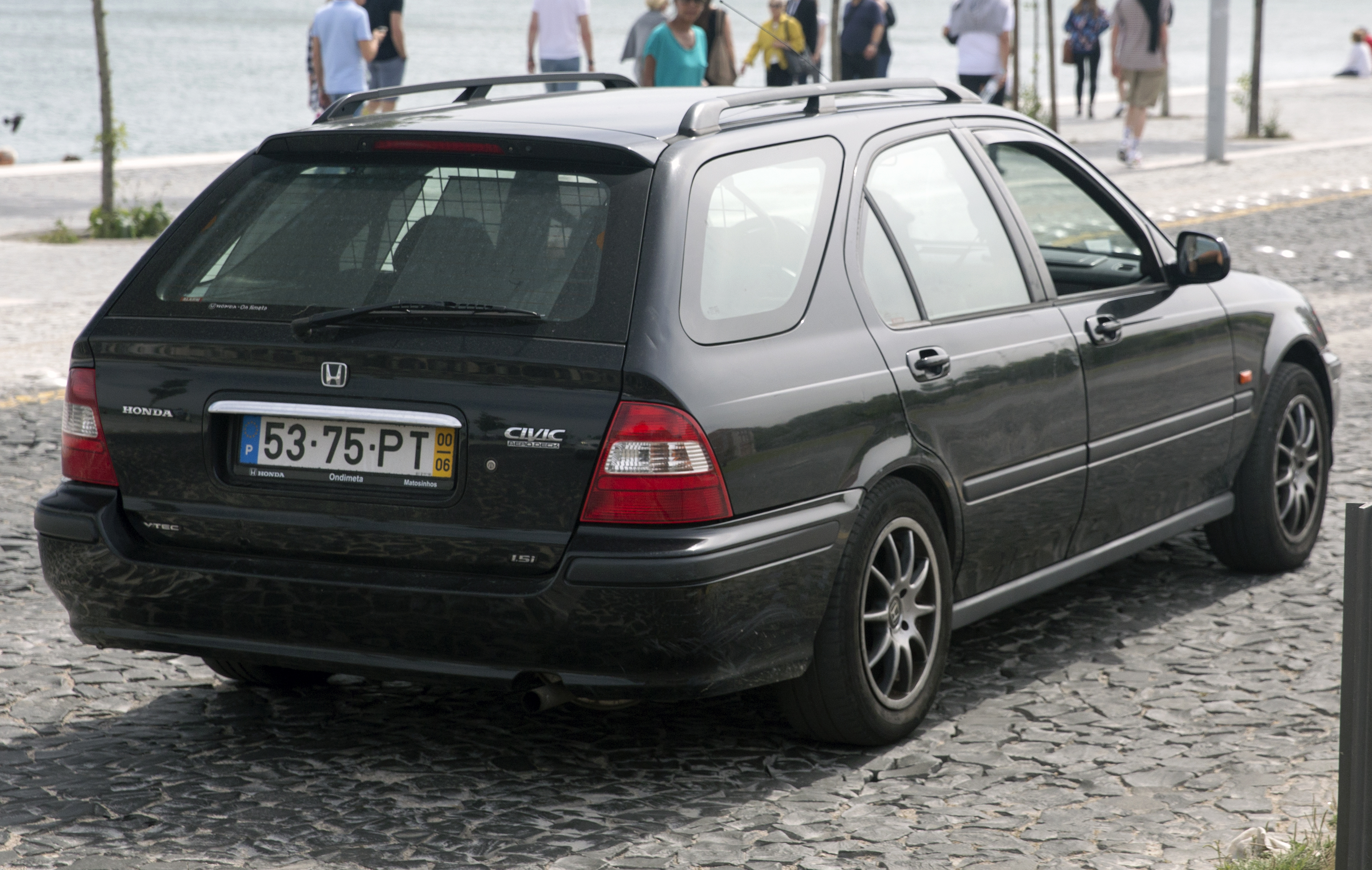
2000 Honda Civic Aerodeck 1.5i (Portugal)

Based on the Domani, which in turn was mechanically similar to the fifth generation Civic, this version was marketed in Europe as the MA/MB/MC Civic and Civic Aerodeck. It was built in five-door hatchback and Aerodeck (Estate) models in various trim levels and engine sizes. The Aerodeck name was previously used on the Honda Accord Aerodeck, which was a two-door station wagon, popularly known in Europe as a shooting-brake. 1.4 L (D14A2/A5/A7, and D14Z4 in the Sport model), 1.5 L (D15Z8/Z6), 1.6 L (D16Y2/Y3, D16W2/W3, D16B2 etc.) and 1.8 liter (B18C4) petrol engines were available. These came with five-door body and fifty-five liter fuel tank, ABS, driver and passenger air bags, power steering and electric door mirrors, amongst other things. The later models came with air conditioning as standard. The 1.8 VTi model was the flagship model (explained in detail below) with the biggest petrol engine to be given to MA MB MC Civics. The Domani-based Civics were also available with the Rover L-Series diesel engine which was a 2-liter, eight-valve, direct-injection turbocharged unit (20T2N, 20T2R); an essential addition in the European market. Later diesel engines came with intercoolers. The chassis codes designated to this model and generation of Civics were chassis codes MA8, MA9, MB1, MB2, MB3, MB4, MB6 and MB7 for the liftback, while the Aerodeck chassis codes are MB8, MB9, MC1, MC2 and MC3. Compared to the original Domani, the Liftback and Aerodeck featured a new interior, similar to that of the more upmarket Rover 400. Honda had a long-serving partnership with the Rover group, who at the time didn't have enough funds for the tooling to produce an all new car, which allowed Rover to produce its own C-segment competitor based around the design of the Domani shell and using a lot of its underpinnings to produce the Rover 400/45 and later MG ZS. Rover made mostly cosmetic changes (which included front fenders/wings, bonnet, headlights, bumpers, rear lights and tailgate were different on the Rover as well as more upmarket cabin materials and greater use of wood and decals) to have a brand new design in the showrooms, which was very cost effective but divided opinion amongst brand enthusiasts.

==== 1.8 /1.6 VTi ====
As with all Honda models of the age, VTi denoted the inclusion of Honda's VTEC technology. There was a rear VTi badge, and decals of "DOHC VTEC" on the rear doors, as well as front and rear bumper lips and side skirts (in VTI-S models). 1996 saw the introduction of the VTi model and then a limited edition VTI-S. The VTI came in two different trim levels – the DOHC 1.6 VTi hatchback and sedan (B16A2 engine) and the DOHC 1.8 VTi five-door (with the larger B18C4). The 1.6 VTi car was actually slightly faster in acceleration than the 1.8 due to the different gear ratios. The 1.6 was also a lighter engine in a lighter car, helping to reduce the 0-60 mph (97 km/h) acceleration time by about 0.3 seconds. Front and rear disc brakes were standard on all VTi/VTi-S versions. The five-door versions (VTi/VTi-S) included a Torsen limited-slip differential, which meant they were quicker out of corners than the 1.6 (three-door) due to being able to accelerate out of corners more effectively.

The 1.8 VTi Civic came with a host of standard equipment, some of which was not available on the three-door (1.6) equivalents. Standard 1.8 spec includes:

Exterior: Front lip/spoiler, rear-boot spoiler with integral brake light, headlight washers, electric sunroof, color-coded mirrors, color-coded door handles, color-coded front rear bumpers, front fog lights and lightweight Speedline 5-spoke alloy wheels.

Interior: Unique half leather sports style seats (full leather optional), front and rear electric windows, heated side mirrors, air conditioning, dashboard instrument light dimmer, front and rear head rests and a leather-wrapped steering wheel with red stitching.

==== United Kingdom limited editions ====
VTi-S

The MB6 VTi-S 5-door was made in a limited run of 500 of each body type, and only sold in the Honda color 'Pirates Black', with body colored bumpers. The VTI-S improved on the appearance of the standard Civic VTi 5-door with a more pronounced front lip and also a rear lip on the bumpers, and different side skirts. The VTi-S specification also included chrome/aluminium gear-knob(silver/black plastic on later VTiS models), VTI-S floor-mats and tailgate badging. It also came fitted with lightweight 15-inch Speedline Chrono alloy wheels, with a split spoke design. The later VTi-S models came fitted with the lightweight Speedline "fan" alloy wheels. Other than this, it is identical to the regular VTi. The instrument dials on later VTi-S models changed slightly, now with italic numbering.

The 3-door EK4 VTi-S was produced in 1998 only and 200 were produced in this time, all on 'R' registration plates. Like the MB6 VTi-S, the EK4 VTi-S was based on the standard VTi hatch, with differences being the Starlight Black paint, front and rear bumper lips/skirts, rear mid-spoiler, 15-inch Speedline chrono alloy wheels, the dashboard cluster used white numbering on the speedometer, fuel gauge etc., rather than orange/red as in the regular VTi, however it still retained the red needles. The boot badges spelling out 'Honda' 'Civic' '1.6VTi' and 'VTEC' were all replaced with a single VTi-S badge, and there was an alloy gear knob and VTi-S floor mats. Mechanically and in performance terms it is identical to a regular EK4 VTi. Due to a problem with the registration process, many genuine VTi-S' were not on the log books as a VTi-S, but a VTi, and regular VTi Civics were logged as VTi-S; this problem also affected the special edition EK4 Civic Jordan, of which some were also logged as a VTi-S.

Civic Jordan

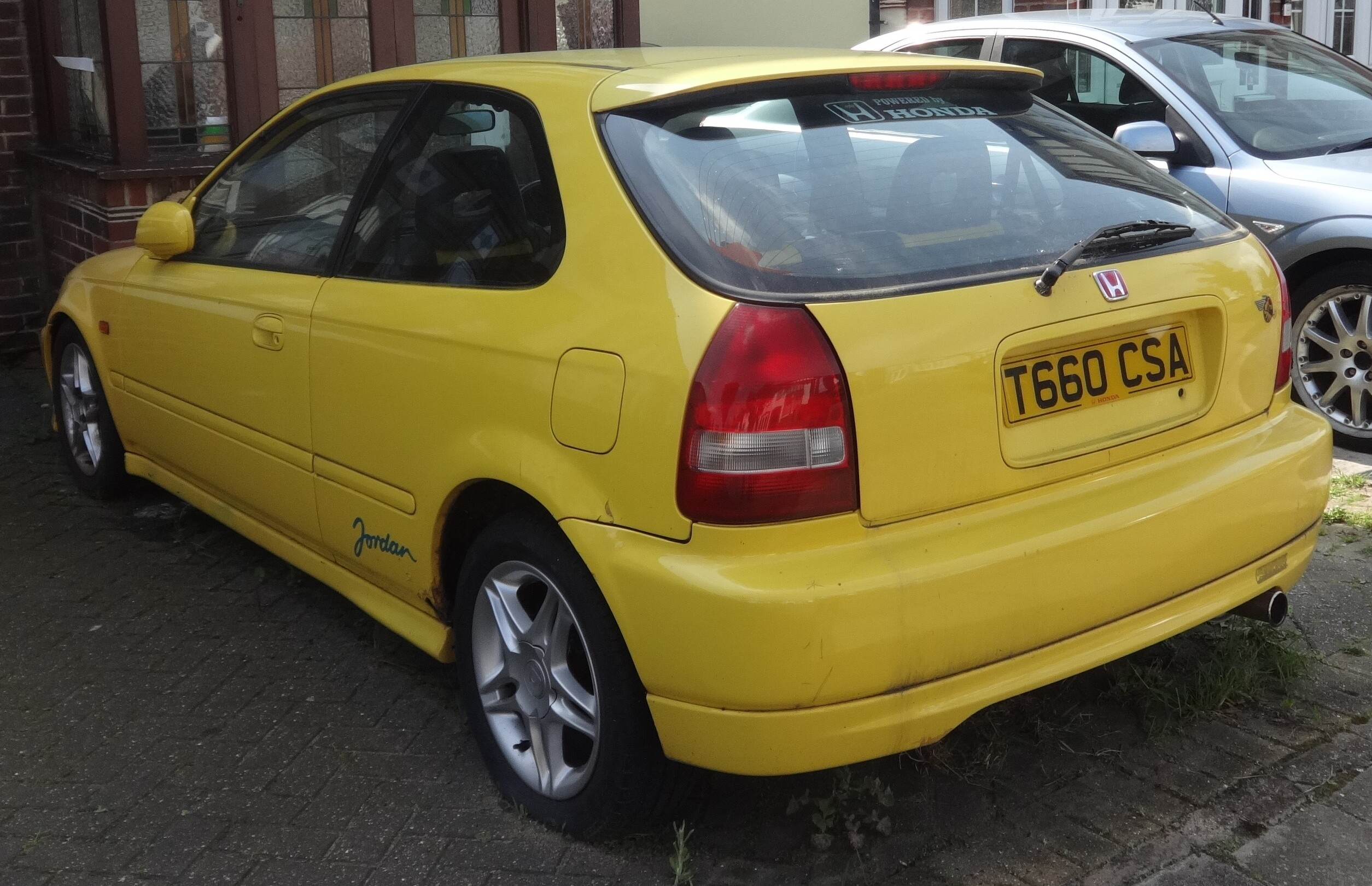
1999 Honda Civic Jordan

To commemorate the Honda (Mugen) Jordan F1 team, a limited edition Honda Civic VTi (EK4 3-door model) was created with their own signed Eddie Jordan plaque with the specific number stamped on it in the center console. This car was sold in 1999–2000. It had the same basic spec as the EK4 VTi, but the extras included: Sunlight Yellow paint work, yellow-and-black leather interior, Jordan decals on the sides and rear of the car as well as stitched into the seats and floor carpets. Only 500 units were made. Like the Renault Clio Williams, the Jordan team had no involvement in the development of the car.

==== Rover 400, 45 and MG ZS ====
Rover developed these vehicles from the Honda Domani-based European Civic, using their own engines. UK produced with styling and interior specifications were aimed primarily at the UK market. Early automatic 400s used the Honda 1.6-liter D-series engine carried over from the R8 Rover 200/400, meanwhile, Honda used Rover’s competitive L-Series diesel for the European Civic in this generation.

== Awards ==
- At its introduction in 1995, the Civic won the Car of the Year Japan Award, which was the nameplate's third such win.
- 1996: The Honda Civic is included in Car and Driver's 10Best
