= Harold Musgrove =

British businessman (born 1930)

Harold John Musgrove (born 1930 in Birmingham) was the chairman of British Leyland's Austin Rover division between 1982–1986 and worked in several roles for the British National Health Service from 1991–2001.

== British Leyland ==
Harold Musgrove had worked in various roles at British Leyland and its predecessor Austin before being offered the role of Chairman of the volume car business Austin Rover in 1982 after the departure of Sir Michael Edwardes, reporting to Roy Horrocks, the chairman of British Leyland's new formed car group. One of his first jobs was to negotiate the contract with Honda over the XX agreement, which would eventually become the Rover 800, and had to deal with the Trojan Horse political potato that had occurred with BL's previous collaboration, the Triumph Acclaim.

Another of his major decisions was to clear the decks of the design team at Austin Rover. David Bache had been running the team, and the LC10/LM11 project which eventually produced the Austin Maestro/Austin Montego had been in the pipeline since 1977, and one of his ideas is said to have incited Musgrove into sacking Bache on the spot. He appointed Roy Axe who had been working in the US for Chrysler and backed him setting up a new design studio at the former Triumph plant at Canley.

Due to the drop in performance of Austin Rover in 1984, Harold Musgrove was asked by the British Government, which had held a controlling stake in the business since 1975, to look for savings. Musgrove persuaded the government to invest in the K Series engine which was to benefit and damage the company in the long term.

In 1986 British Leyland's head of Cars Ray Horrocks had discussions with Ford about a buyout, however the collapse of General Motors purchase of British Leyland's truck division meant the deal was stopped. Due to the press anger caused by this and the Westland sale, British Leyland's management was changed by the government bringing in Graham Day in 1986 to oversee the new business. Roy Horrocks, Musgrove's boss resigned and Musgrove followed shortly after when he was asked to sack Kevin Morley, the sales director, by Graham Day.

== NHS ==
In 1991 Musgrove joined the NHS as chairman of the West Midlands Ambulance Service. He eventually left this role joining Heartlands Hospital in Birmingham and oversaw the controversial merger with Solihull District Hospital during the mid 1990s.

In 1998 Harold Musgrove became Chairman of the Worcester Health Services, closing accident and emergency services at Kidderminster Hospital and opening a new PFI funded hospital as part of a radical shakeup of services. However a University College London report in 2000 stated that the reforms left Worcestershire with "one of the lowest levels of hospital provision in the country". In 2001 Harold Musgrove resigned as the chairman of the Worcestershire Acute Hospitals NHS trust.
