= Triumph Acclaim =

Triumph sedan automobile

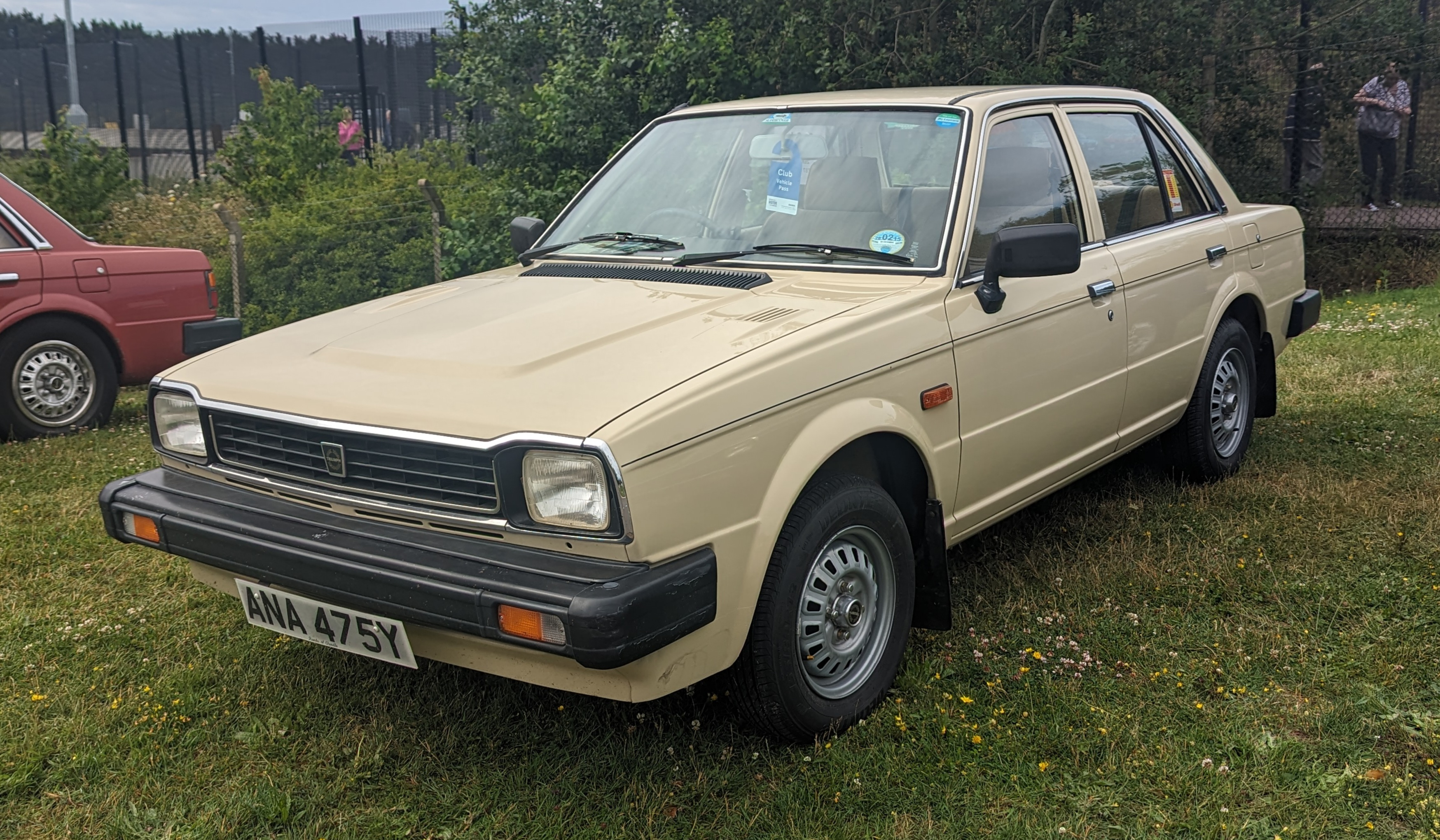

Overview
- Manufacturer: Triumph (British Leyland)
- Production: October 1981 – June 1984; 133,626 made
- Assembly: United Kingdom: Cowley, Oxford (Cowley plant)

Body and chassis
- Class: Small family car (C)
- Body style: 4-door saloon
- Related: Honda Ballade; Honda Civic (2nd Gen)

Powertrain
- Engine: 1,335 cc (81.5 cu in) EN4 I4
- Transmission: 5-speed manual; 3-speed automatic

Dimensions
- Wheelbase: 91 in (2,311 mm)
- Length: 161 in (4,089 mm)
- Width: 63 in (1,600 mm)
- Height: 53 in (1,346 mm)

Chronology
- Predecessor: Triumph Dolomite
- Successor: Rover 200 (SD3)

The Triumph Acclaim is a small family car manufactured by British Leyland (BL) from 1981 to 1984, as a locally built version of the Honda Ballade. It is a four-door saloon car with a front-engine, front-wheel-drive layout. The Acclaim was the final car marketed under the Triumph marque, and the first product of the alliance between BL (later the Rover Group) and Honda which would last until the mid-1990s.

The Acclaim was the first Japanese-designed car manufactured within the European Economic Community (now the European Union), to bypass Japan's voluntary limit of 11 per cent market of the total number of European sales. Most Acclaims were sold in the United Kingdom. It was a major turnaround point for BL itself, achieving both reliability and high build quality from the outset.

Assembled at the Pressed Steel Fisher Plant at Cowley, Oxford, the Acclaim paved the way for the Honda-based, Rover-badged range of cars which BL (and successor organisations Austin Rover and Rover Group) would develop throughout the 1980s and 1990s.

== Background ==
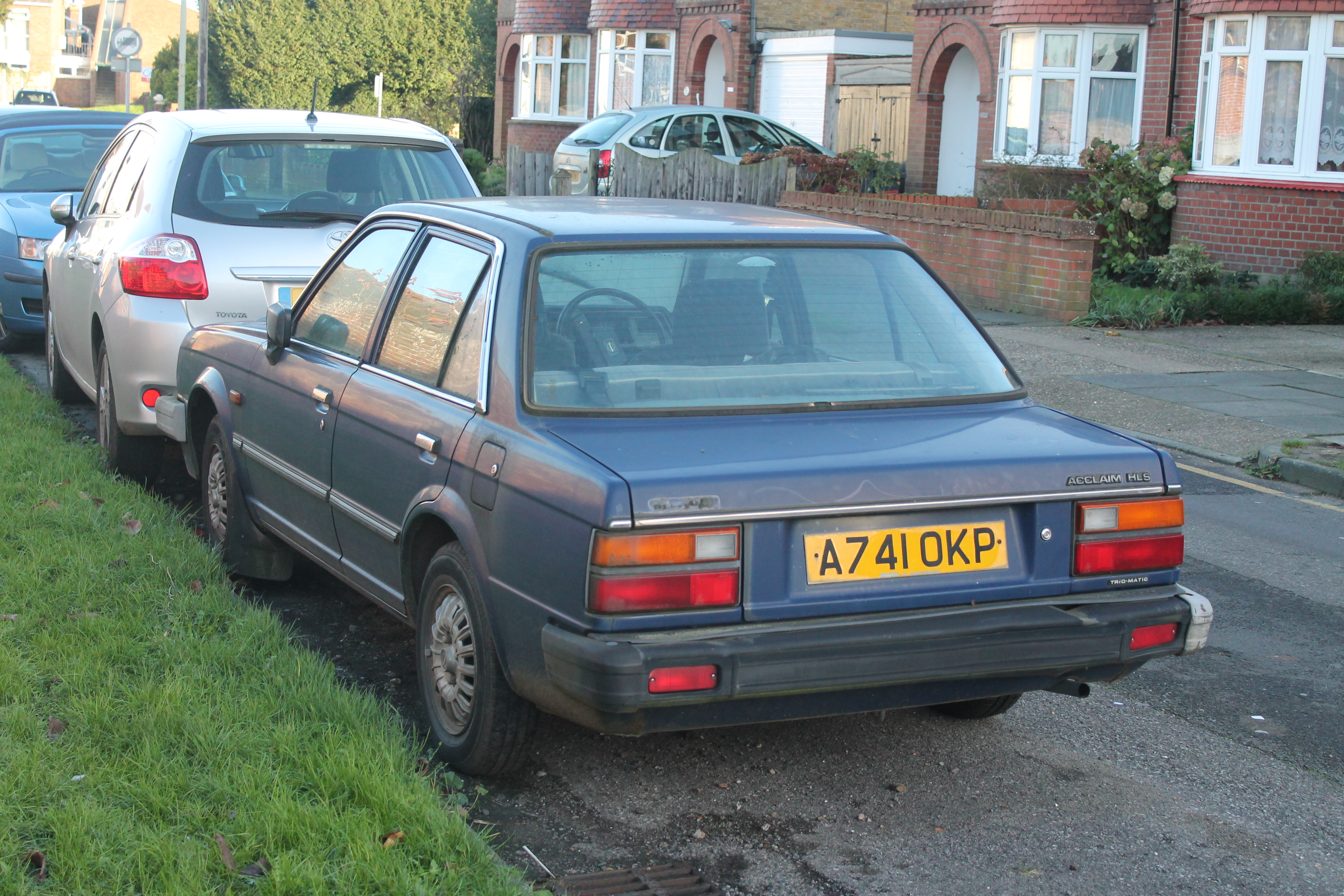
1984 Triumph Acclaim HLS Trio-Auto rear

The development process began in 1978, when British Leyland entered into negotiations with Honda to develop a new small family saloon. Although the Acclaim officially replaced the Triumph Dolomite, BL's mainstream products in the segment were the Austin Allegro and Austin Maxi - both of which were outdated and nearing the end of a long production run. The Acclaim was therefore originally intended as a short-term product until all-new products were ready for launch. On 26 December 1979, Michael Edwardes officially signed a collaboration between the two companies, with the project initially being known as "Bounty" but later taking the BL designator LC9. The new car would be essentially be a licence-built version of the Honda Ballade (itself derived from the second generation Honda Civic), but with some modifications for the European market and locally sourced content. It replaced the Triumph Dolomite, which had finished production a year when the Canley plant in Coventry was closed down. The Acclaim was officially launched by BL on 7 October 1981. The Maxi had just been withdrawn from production at this stage, with Allegro production ending in March 1982.

The end of Dolomite and TR7 production meant that the Acclaim was the only car made with a Triumph badge after 1981.

The Acclaim was a major turnaround point for BL itself, with the car achieving good reliability and build quality from the outset - a stark contrast to the quality-control issues which had plagued earlier models. The Acclaim held the record for the lowest percentage of warranty claims for a BL car.

Unlike previous Triumphs, the Acclaim was assembled at the Pressed Steel Fisher Plant at Cowley, Oxford, taking over the withdrawn Austin Maxi production lines. Many workers from the closed MG plant at Abingdon were reassigned to Cowley to work on the Acclaim. It was briefly produced alongside the Morris Ital, a revamped version of the Marina. BL invested £80 million in new production facilities at Cowley, with a new press line and paint shop installed specifically for the Acclaim. Whilst major parts such as the powertrain, chassis components, dashboard assembly and much of the electrical systems were imported from Honda's factories in Japan, the amount of British-sourced content within the Acclaim gradually increased over its production life.

== Design and mechanicals ==
The most notable outward change from the Honda was the appearance of a central badge on the grille. At the time, the Japanese model had "Honda" to the right-hand side of the grille. Other changes included twin Keihin-produced carburettors (the Ballade had only a single carburettor), the mirrors were situated on the doors, the independent front and rear MacPherson strut suspension was tweaked for the UK market and the seats were based on Morris Ital frames. The Acclaim was provided in a more luxurious interior trim than its Honda equivalent, even in its base models. The Acclaim has disc brakes at the front and drum brakes at the rear.

All Acclaims were powered by the transverse-mounted all alloy and overhead-cam 1,335 cc (81.5 cu in) engine found in the Honda Civic. This engine was a member of the Honda CVCC family, although the cast alloy rocker cover with Honda branding was replaced with a plain black pressed steel item for the Acclaim to disguise the car's Honda origins. The engine drove the front wheels through either a five-speed manual gearbox or a three-speed Trio-matic (which was a manually selectable automatic transmission) gearbox (the same as the Hondamatic) and the interior was nearly identical (except for the seats). The usual BL trim levels were offered: L, HL, HLS and the top of the range CD, which had front and rear electric windows, chrome bumpers, headlamp washers, 165/70 tyres (the L had 145/80 tyres and the HL & HLS had 155/80 tyres), plastic wheel trims, velour upholstery with seat pockets on the back of the front seats, front seat head restraints and optional air conditioning. The car remained largely the same throughout its production life. A Mark 2 version of the Acclaim came out in 1983 (from VI No. 180415 onwards). The main changes were to the exterior door handles, an electronic digital clock replaced the previous mechanical one, a restyled steering wheel, a restyled gear knob, the rear interior door handles (they were just swapped) and the heater recirculation control, which was moved. Mark 2 HL and HLS cars were better equipped than the earlier ones.

== Marketing and sales ==
There was a limited-edition Avon Acclaim, getting its name from Avon coachbuilders of Warwick who did the conversion work, that had leather seats with piping to match the body colour, leather door panels, wooden and leather trimmed dashboard, wooden door cappings, two-tone metallic paint, colour-coded wheels with chrome embellishers, chrome-plated grille, colour-coded headlamp surrounds, vinyl roof and extra soundproofing. There was also an Avon Turbo, which had Lunar alloy wheels with 205/60 tyres, suede upholstery, front air dam, and side decals. A turbocharger made by Turbo Technics increased the engine's power output from the standard 70 brake horsepower (52 kW; 71 PS) to 105 brake horsepower (78 kW; 106 PS). It is thought that there are only four surviving Avon Turbos including the press car (VWK689X), which was the first Avon Turbo.

The Acclaim was Britain's seventh best selling car in 1982 and the eighth best selling car in 1983.

The demise of the Acclaim came in June 1984 when the Rover 200 was launched, based on the next incarnation of the Honda Ballade. A total of 133,625 Acclaims were produced, the vast majority of which were sold in the UK. The last Acclaim off the production line (a silver CD with the Trio-matic) is now in the British Motor Museum. The Acclaim's demise saw the end of the Triumph marque as a car (although the name continues in motorcycles), as Austin Rover's restructuring retained only the Austin, Rover and MG marques, and by 1989 even the Austin marque had been axed. Earlier in 1984, Austin Rover had confirmed that the Triumph brand would be discontinued when the Acclaim was replaced, and its successor would be badged as a Rover.

On Sunday 9 October 2011, to celebrate the 30th anniversary of the launch of the Acclaim, 23 Acclaims were gathered at the Cowley works where the cars were built and the British Motor Museum. This included the oldest known surviving Acclaim, the first Avon Turbo, the final production Acclaim and the only known nut-and-bolt restored Acclaim.

By mid-2020, 125 Triumph Acclaims were left on the road, with a further 258 registered as off the road.
