= Honda Ballade =

Honda Ballade series SS/ST (1st gen) AJ/AK (2nd gen)
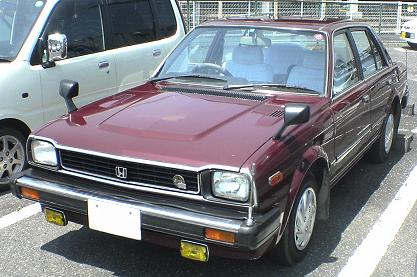

Overview
- Manufacturer: Honda
- Also called: Triumph Acclaim (1st gen); Honda Civic (2nd gen); Rover 200-series (2nd gen); Honda City (2011–2025)
- Production: September 1980 – 2000; 2011–2025 (South Africa)
- Assembly: Suzuka, Japan; Cowley, Oxford, United Kingdom; Longbridge, United Kingdom; East London, South Africa (Mercedes-Benz South Africa)

Body and chassis
- Class: Compact car (C)
- Body style: 4-door sedan

Powertrain
- Engine: 1.3L EJ I4 (1st gen); 1.5L EM I4 (1st gen); 1.3L EV I4 (2nd gen); 1.5L EW I4 (2nd gen)
- Transmission: 2-speed Hondamatic (1st gen); 3-speed automatic (2nd gen); 4/5-speed manual (1st and 2nd gen)

Dimensions
- Wheelbase: 2,320 mm (91.3 in) (1st gen); 2,450 mm (96.5 in) (2nd gen)
- Length: 4,095 mm (161.2 in) (1st gen); 4,160 mm (163.8 in) (2nd gen)
- Width: 1,600 mm (63.0 in) (1st gen); 1,630 mm (64.2 in) (2nd gen)
- Height: 1,345 mm (53.0 in) (1st gen); 1,385 mm (54.5 in) (2nd gen)

Chronology
- Successor: Honda Integra SJ (sedan); Honda Concerto (hatchback)

The Honda Ballade (Japanese: ホンダ・バラード, Hepburn: Honda Barādo) is a subcompact automobile built by Honda of Japan. It began as a four-door higher equipment content version of the Civic in 1980. The Ballade was developed at the same time the Honda Vigor appeared, which was a higher content Honda Accord. In Japan, the Ballade was sold exclusively at Honda Verno dealerships alongside the Vigor, Prelude, CR-X, and Quint. In Europe, the first generation Ballade was manufactured under license by British Leyland and sold as the Triumph Acclaim.

== History ==
The name of the car was taken from ballade, the French word for a ballad. Because both the four-door Ballade sedan and the five-door hatchback Quintet were both high luxury content vehicles derived from the Honda Civic, the Ballade represented a type of music, and the Quintet represented a musical group. The Ballade competed in Japan with the Toyota Sprinter, and the Nissan Laurel Spirit as the Civic competed with the Corolla, and the Sunny.

It was launched in September 1980, nine months after the agreement between Honda and British Leyland to produce their own versions of the car and work on future cars together. Although the original Ballade was never sold in Europe, British Leyland produced its own version of the Ballade - the Triumph Acclaim - from 1981 to 1984. In North America the Ballade nameplate was never used, the model instead being sold as the Civic Sedan.

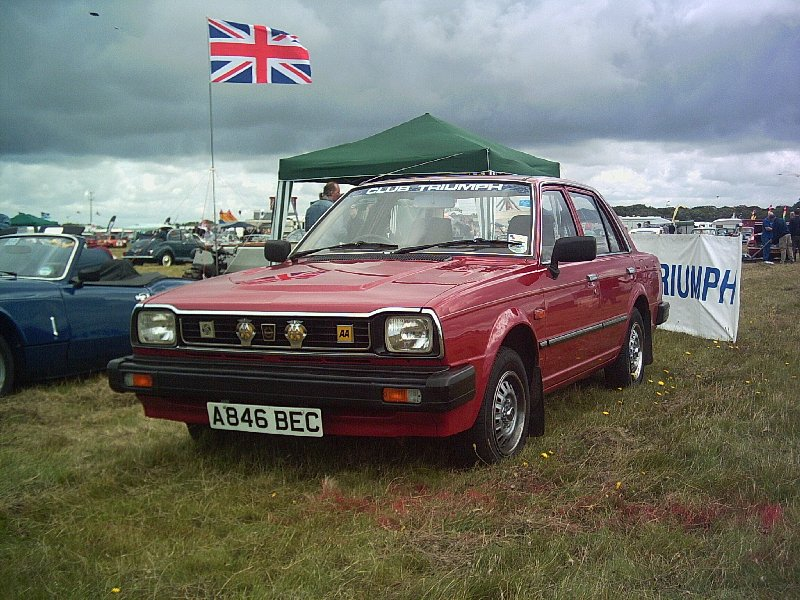
Triumph Acclaim

A second generation Ballade from 1985 shared most of its body panels with the Civic, except for a sportier front end, and formed the basis of the CR-X sports car and the Rover 200. The top model - the EX-i - featured a 1.5L naturally aspirated 12-valve all-aluminium engine with multi-point fuel injection (using Honda's PGM-FI system) developing 100 bhp (75 kW), the same engine was used in the CR-X. Other features of the EX-i included electric windows all-round, electric and heated wing mirrors, metallic paint, vented front disc brakes and hydraulic power-assisted steering. Lower specification models featured the same 1.5L engine but with fueling provided via a carburetor, producing 85 bhp (63 kW).

In keeping with the styling trend shared with other Honda Verno products, the second generation car adopted partially concealed headlights starting in 1983, shared with the Vigor, Quint Integra, Ballade Sports CR-X, and the Prelude.

The Ballade in Japan was replaced in September 1987, with the Honda Concerto 5-door hatchback and sedan as the luxury Civic offering at newly established Honda Clio dealerships in Japan. As the Ballade was essentially a luxury version of the Civic sedan, Honda repositioned the Ballade from Honda Verno, first with the Concerto name, then renamed again as the Honda Domani at Honda Clio, and introduced it with the Honda Accord, the Honda Inspire, and the Honda Legend in 1992, with the Civic now headlining at Honda Primo stores. The sport-oriented version of the Civic loosely held by the Ballade evolved into the Honda Integra in 1985, and assumed the market position originally held by the Ballade at Honda Verno dealership locations.

In South Africa, the nameplate was revived in 2011 for the Honda City sold in other markets.

== South Africa ==
=== 1980–1983 ===
1300cc Twin carb, 5-speed manual or 3-speed automatic E-series engine

=== 1984–1987 ===
Known in South Africa as the SC9, or informally as the "popup" as to not confuse it with the SH4. This particular model had motorised eyelids which popped up when the main headlights were switched on.

Engines included 1.3-liter 12-valve EV, 1.5-liter 12-valve EW, 1.5-liter 12-valve PGMFI EW and ZC (first gen) D-series.

=== 1988–1991 ===
Also known as the Honda Civic series EF (internationally), the Civic Coupe and Sedan, or the Ballade series SH3 and SH4 (South Africa). Known on the streets of South Africa as "DOHC" as not to confuse it with the SC9 or SR4.

Engines includes: D15B3 D16A7 D16A9

D-series engines

=== 1992–1995 ===
South African chassis code SR4, which internationally is sold as the Honda Civic fifth gen (EG).

Engines: D15B3 - 69 kW D16A7 - 86 kW D16A9 - 96 kW B18B3 - 97 kW

=== 1996–2000 ===
In 1996 the Ballade and Civic got a facelift with a total of 12 changes. Honda & Colt (Mitsubishi) Division of Mercedes-Benz of South Africa marketing manager Guy Franken says: "With a total 12 derivatives in the range we believe that we have the entire small/intermediate car market covered and offer value in performance, specification, safety and affordability."

These changes include:

- A beverage holder
- The velour colour of the bolsters in the Luxline has been changed to a more modern blue/grey.
- A more pronounced grooved styling line in the bonnet.
- A larger H-emblem on the grille.
- Redesigned bumpers with no inserts.
- A Becker A7 radio/tape was fitted in all Luxline models.
- An anti-shock gearbox on the Ballade 180i Luxline Automatic.
- Lightweight alloy wheels on the 180i and VTEC models and full wheel covers on the others.

There was also an AMG version sold at AMG dealers since AMG Managed the racing team. It had some small modifications that allowed it to produce 129kW in B16A6 format. A Sport trim was also available, it added Sport badges, an aluminum gear knob like the DC2 Type R and subtle suspension tuning.

The engines available: D15Z4 D16Y9 B18B4 118 kW B16A6

D-series engines and B-series engines

== Ballade (South Africa) reintroduction ==
The Ballade name continued to be used for a Civic-based model in South Africa, where it was used instead of Civic on locally produced versions until 2001. South African Ballades were assembled by the local subsidiary of Daimler-Benz, which wanted to market a smaller and cheaper car in addition to its Mercedes-Benz models. The Ballade name was adopted because it was perceived to have more luxury and upmarket connotations than the Civic name. This was important because the Ballade was sold through the Mercedes-Benz dealership channel.

From March 2011 to November 2025, the City was sold as the Ballade in South Africa.
