= Michael Edwardes =

British-South African business executive (1930–2019)

Sir Michael Edwardes
- Born: Michael Owen Edwardes; 11 October 1930; Port Elizabeth, Union of South Africa
- Died: 15 September 2019 (aged 88)
- Education: Rhodes University
- Employer: British Leyland
- Title: Chairman
- Term: 1977–1982
- Children: 3

Sir Michael Owen Edwardes (11 October 1930 – 15 September 2019) was a British-South African business executive who held chairmanships at several companies - most notably motor manufacturer British Leyland in the late 1970s and early 1980s.

== Education ==
Edwardes was born in Port Elizabeth, and was matriculated from St. Andrew's College in 1947 before graduating from Rhodes University.

== Career ==
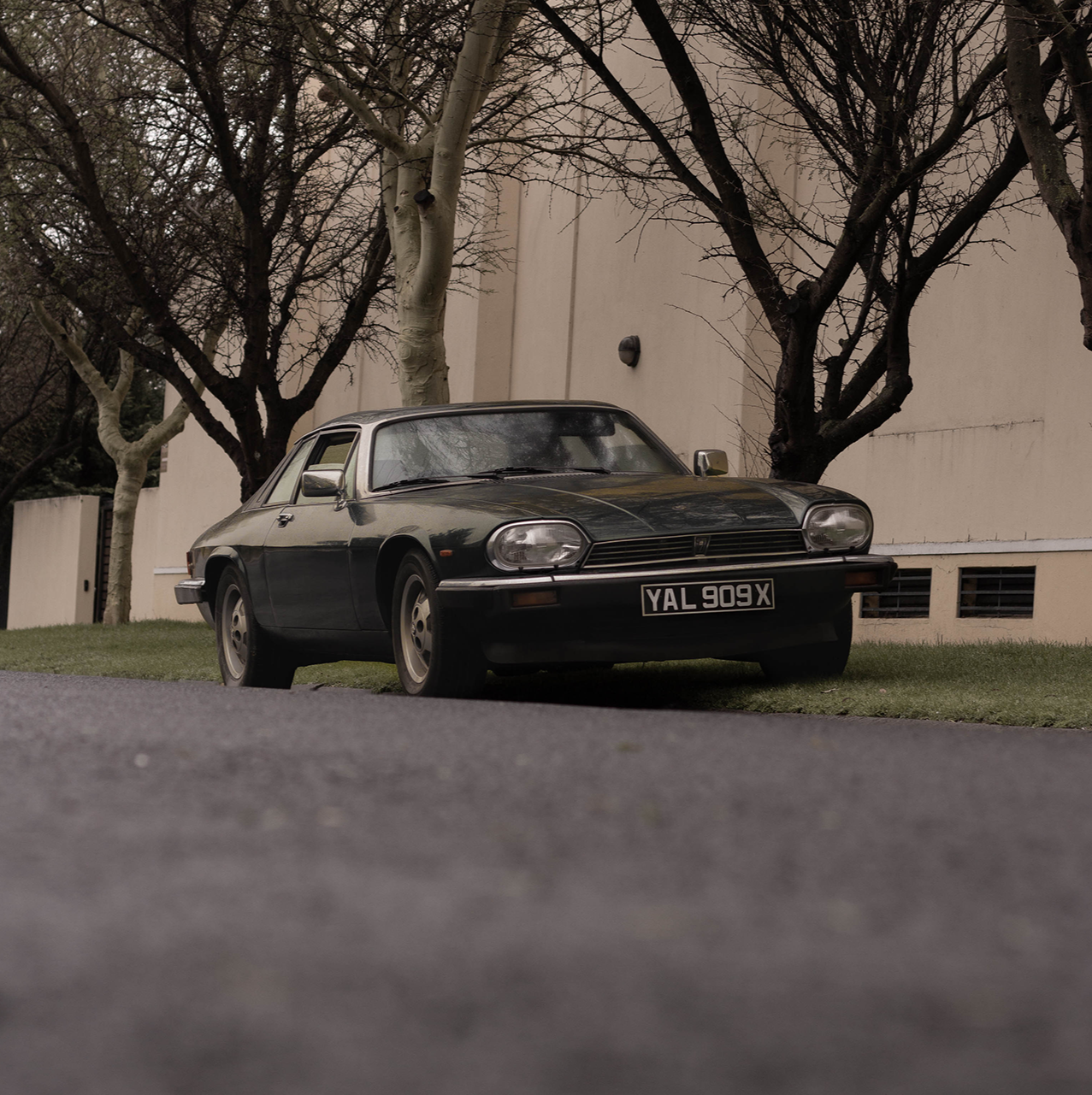

Edwardes began his career in 1951 as a management trainee for battery manufacturer Chloride. In 1966, he served as the general manager of Alkaline Batteries, one of the group's operating companies at Redditch, Worcestershire, UK. He later joined the Chloride main board, became chief executive in 1971 and remained in that position until 1977.

He was appointed to the UK's National Enterprise Board, a quango whose role was to provide financing to large UK state-owned enterprises (or nationalised industries), including the country's ailing motor giant, British Leyland, when it was nationalised in 1975. In 1977, he was appointed as chief executive of British Leyland, and within two weeks he became chairman as the company's board was 'pruned' from 13 to 7 members. He was knighted in the 1979 Birthday Honours.

The next year, he attracted criticism for a speech to the CBI Conference in which he said, "If the Cabinet do not have the wit and imagination to reconcile our industrial needs with the fact of North Sea oil, they would do better to leave the bloody stuff in the ground". His tenure at British Leyland lasted until 1982, when he was replaced by Harold Musgrove.

In 1982, on his retirement from British Leyland as CEO, Edwardes was presented with a British racing green Jaguar XJS. He later had this car shipped to South Africa, where he used it for board meetings at General Motors South Africa in 1988.

In 1984, he became chairman of computer manufacturer ICL, but resigned six months later when the company was acquired by STC. He then became chairman of Dunlop Holdings until its 1985 sale to BTR plc, briefly returned to Chloride as chairman in 1986, and in 1988 became non-executive chairman of Charter Consolidated. From 1984 to 1993, Edwardes worked for Minorco.

In his book Back from the Brink (1983), Edwardes discusses his experiences at British Leyland.

== Personal life ==
In 1958 Edwardes married Mary Margaret Finlay, a psychotherapist and anti-apartheid campaigner. The couple, who had three daughters, divorced in 1984.

== Book ==
- Back from the Brink, HarperCollins 1983, ISBN 978-0-00217-098-7
