= Mercedes-Benz South Africa =

South African subsidiary of Mercedes-Benz Group

Mercedes-Benz South Africa (Pty) Ltd.
- Type: Subsidiary
- Industry: Automotive
- Founded: 1962; 64 years ago
- Headquarters: East London, Eastern Cape, South Africa
- Key people: Claudius Steinhoff (President and CEO)
- Products: Luxury Vehicles; Commercial Vehicles
- Parent: Mercedes-Benz Group
- Website: corporate.mercedes-benz.co.za

Mercedes-Benz South Africa (Pty) Ltd. (MBSA) is a subsidiary of the Mercedes-Benz Group that manufactures passenger cars and commercial vehicles in South Africa.

== History ==
In 1896, the Benz Velo was the first car to be imported into South Africa. The first Daimler-Benz branch in South Africa was opened in 1954 and four years later signed a contract with Car Distributors and Assemblers (CDA) in East London to assemble the W120, W121 and W180 series. CDA had previously assembled Nash, Fiat, Renault, Land Rover, Hino (Briska model), Prince (Miler model) and Commer vehicles since 1950. Other brands assembled were Standard, DKW/Auto Union and Alfa Romeo. In the late 80’s to early 00’s Honda and Mitsubishi L200 vehicles were assembled on the same production line as the W123/124/202 models and Mercedes Commercial Truck and Buses on a specialized line

CDA began producing Mercedes-Benz trucks in 1962 and was taken over by United Car and Diesel Distributors (UCDD) (Pty) Ltd in 1966, which at that time had been the sole sales company for Mercedes-Benz in South Africa for four years. With the engine plant opened in 1973, Mercedes-Benz engines were manufactured outside of Germany for the first time. In 1979, the company Atlantis Diesel Engines received a license to produce commercial vehicle engines. In 1984, Daimler-Benz AG acquired 50.1% of the shares in UCCD and changed the name to Mercedes-Benz of South Africa (Pty) Ltd. The first managing director of the new company was Jürgen Schrempp, who had worked in South Africa with interruptions since 1974. Other shareholders in the new company were the Ernst Göhner Foundation in Switzerland (23.4%) and Volkskas (26.5%), whose shares Daimler-Benz was to take over in 1992 (Volkskas) and 1998 (EGS).

After the merger of the parent company, Mercedes-Benz of South Africa became DaimlerChrysler South Africa (Pty) Ltd. in 1999. After the parent company split up, DaimlerChrysler South Africa changed its name back to Mercedes-Benz South Africa (Pty) Ltd. at the end of 2007. The company had around 2,700 employees in 2013.

== Models ==
=== Previous ===
In the 1950s and 1960s, CDA, on behalf of its customer Daimler-Benz, was one of the critics of the political guidelines for the increasing domestic production share, as this would not result in satisfactory quality in South Africa. In the course of the more stringent requirements, MBSA also temporarily bought body panels from Volkswagen of South Africa.

One of the best-known vehicles made in East London is a red Mercedes-Benz S 500 from Nelson Mandela. MBSA workers built this vehicle in unpaid overtime from parts provided by the company free of charge. It was given to Mandela in 1990 after his release. Today, the vehicle is in the Apartheid Museum in Johannesburg.

The C-Class has been the focus of the brand's South African manufacturing for decades. SA manufactures C-Class vehicles for its domestic market, as well as for export to Australia (since 1997), Japan (since 2000), and the United States (since 2007).

In 2015, MBSA manufactured the one millionth passenger car. In the same year, truck production (which had only started four years later) reached a level of 125,000 units.

In addition to Mercedes-Benz models, CDA and MBSA also manufactured other vehicles. From 1982 to 2000 CDA/MBSA produced Honda models. After the first global joint venture between Daimler-Benz and Mitsubishi, MBSA started manufacturing the Colt L200 pick-up in 1994. In 2006, the Dodge brand found its way into the South African model range.

=== Current ===
Mercedes-Benz South Africa manufactures the C-Class sedan at its East London, Eastern Cape plant. The vehicle is produced for the domestic and export markets, in both left- and right-hand drive variants. Production of the fifth-generation W206 C-Class commenced at the plant in 2021.
