= Honda Civic GX =

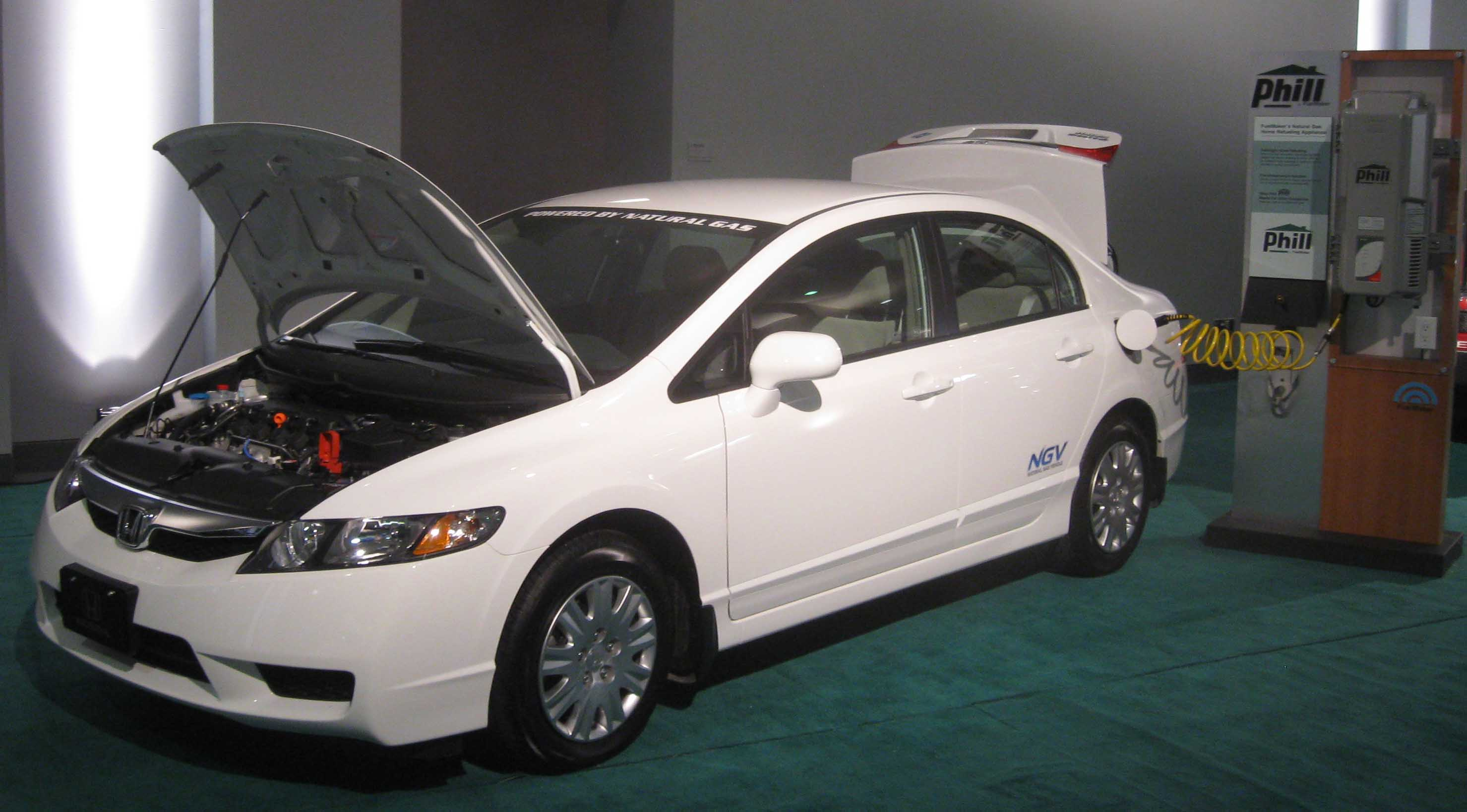

Overview
- Manufacturer: Honda
- Production: 1998–2015

Body and chassis
- Class: Subcompact (1998–2000); Compact (2001-15)
- Body style: 4-door sedan
- Layout: FF layout

Chronology
- Successor: 3rd generation Honda Insight

First generation
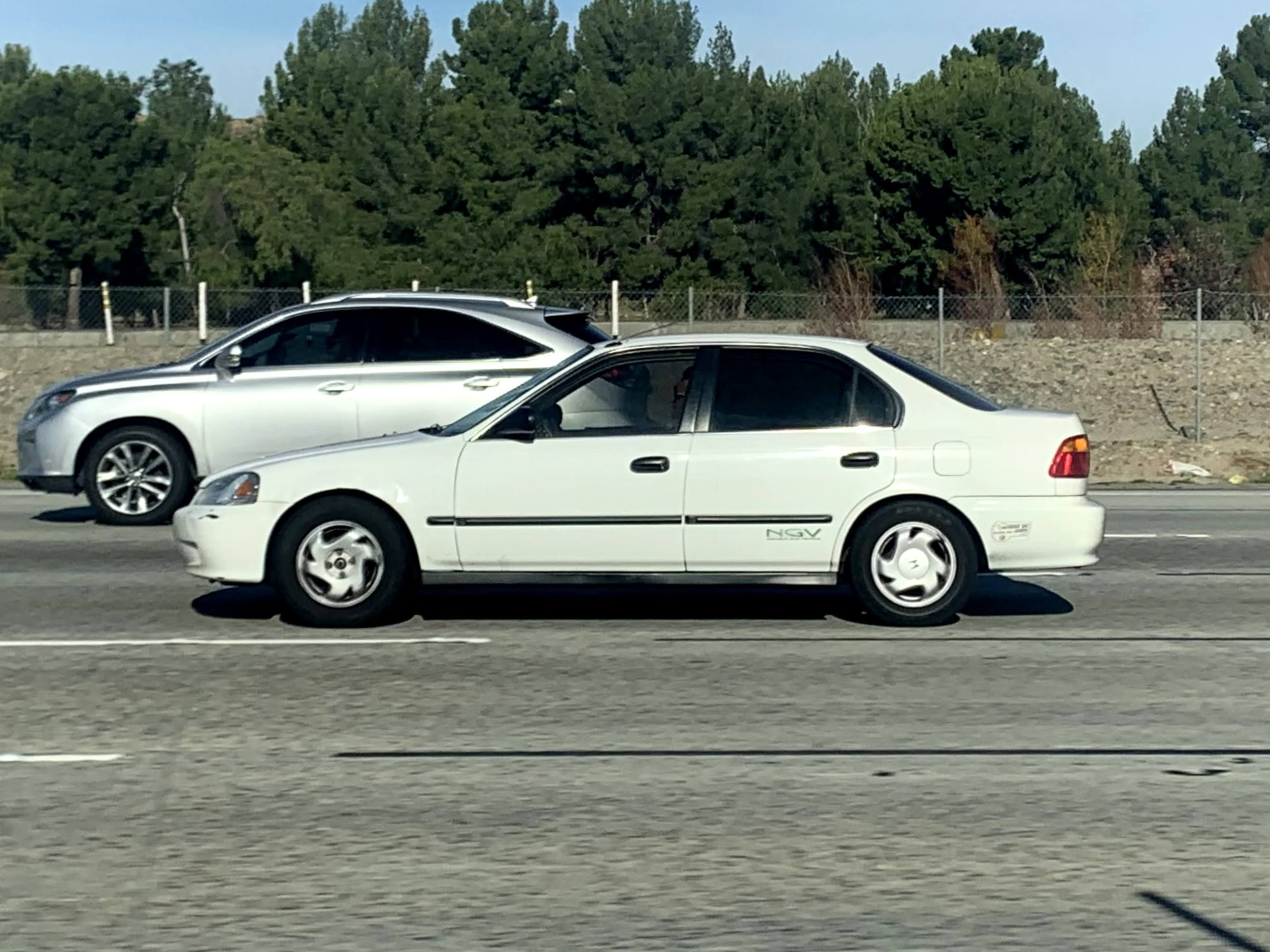

Overview
- Production: 1998–2000
- Assembly: East Liberty, Ohio (ELAP)

Body and chassis
- Platform: Honda Civic (sixth generation)
- Related: Acura EL; Honda CR-V; Honda/Acura Integra; Isuzu Gemini; Honda Domani

Powertrain
- Engine: 1.6L I4
- Transmission: 4-speed automatic

Dimensions
- Wheelbase: 103.2 in (2,621 mm)
- Length: 175.1 in (4,448 mm)
- Width: 67.1 in (1,704 mm)
- Height: 54.7 in (1,389 mm)

Second generation
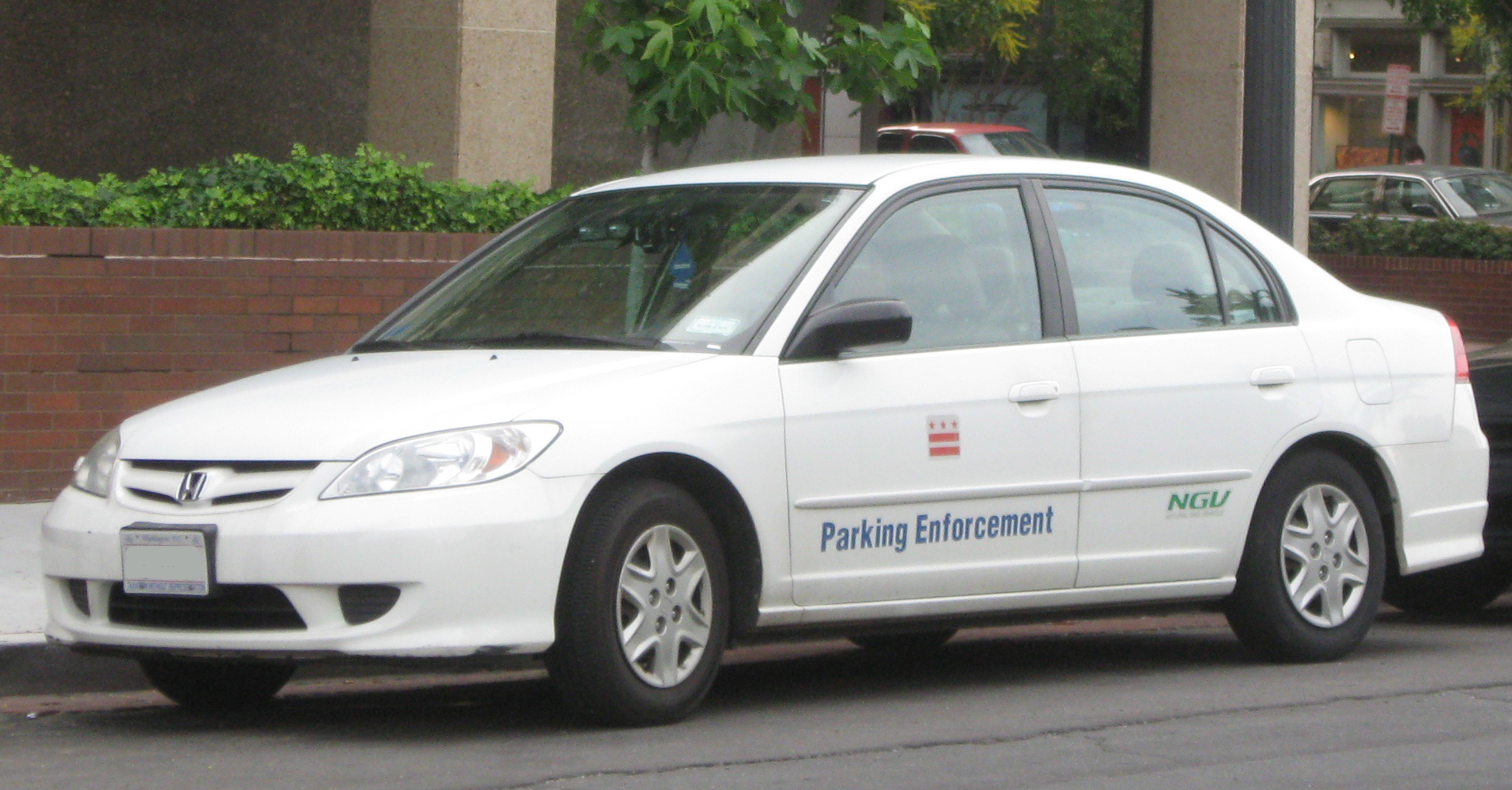

Overview
- Production: 2001–2005
- Assembly: East Liberty, Ohio (ELAP)

Body and chassis
- Platform: Honda Civic (seventh generation)
- Related: Acura EL; Honda CR-V; Honda Element; Acura/Honda Integra; Acura RSX/Honda Integra; Honda Civic Hybrid

Powertrain
- Engine: 1.7L I4
- Transmission: CVT

Dimensions
- Wheelbase: 103.1 in (2,619 mm)
- Length: 174.6 in (4,435 mm) (2001–03); 175.4 in (4,455 mm) (2004–05)
- Width: 67.7 in (1,720 mm)
- Height: 56.9 in (1,445 mm)

Third generation
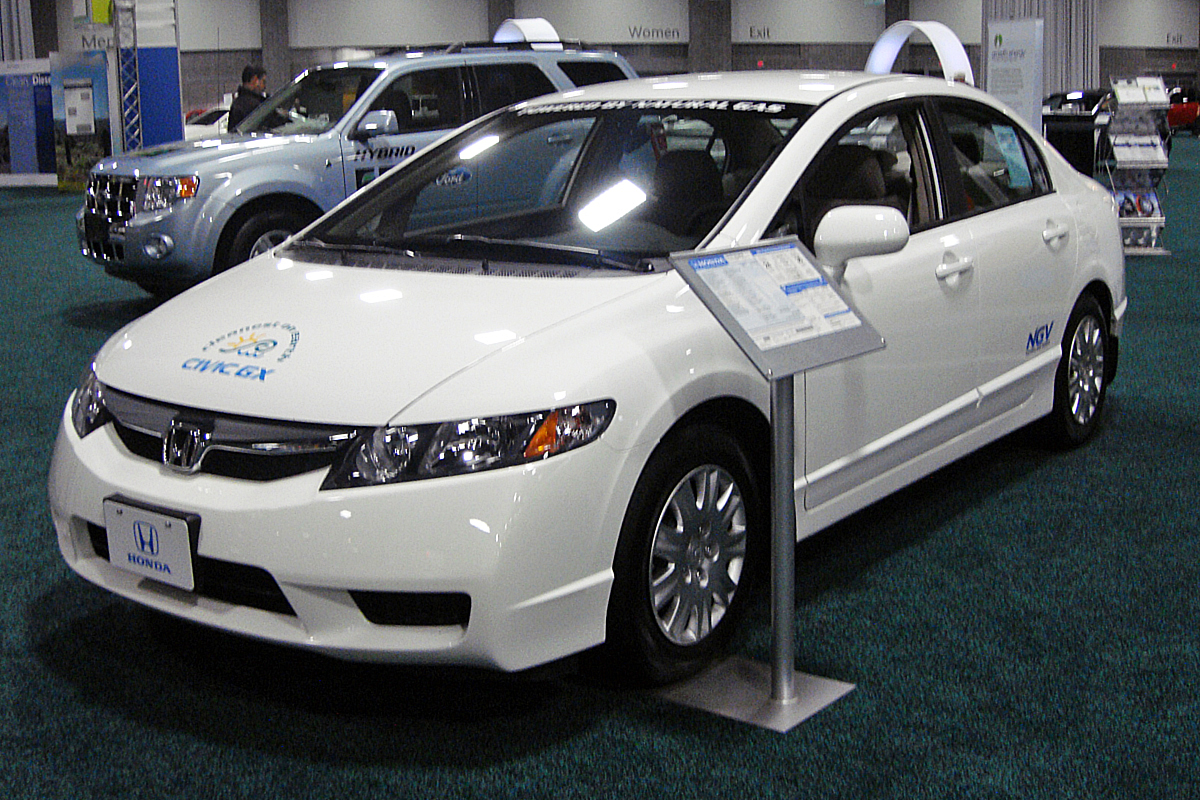

Overview
- Production: 2006–2011
- Assembly: East Liberty, Ohio (ELAP) 2006~2008; Greensburg, Indiana 2009~2011 (HMI)

Body and chassis
- Platform: Honda Civic (eighth generation)
- Related: Acura CSX; Honda CR-V; Honda Element; Acura RSX/Honda Integra; Honda Civic Hybrid

Powertrain
- Engine: 1.8L I4
- Transmission: 5-speed automatic

Dimensions
- Wheelbase: 106.3 in (2,700 mm)
- Length: 176.7 in (4,488 mm) (2006–2008); 177.3 in (4,503 mm) (2009–2011)
- Width: 69.0 in (1,753 mm)
- Height: 56.5 in (1,435 mm)

Fourth generation
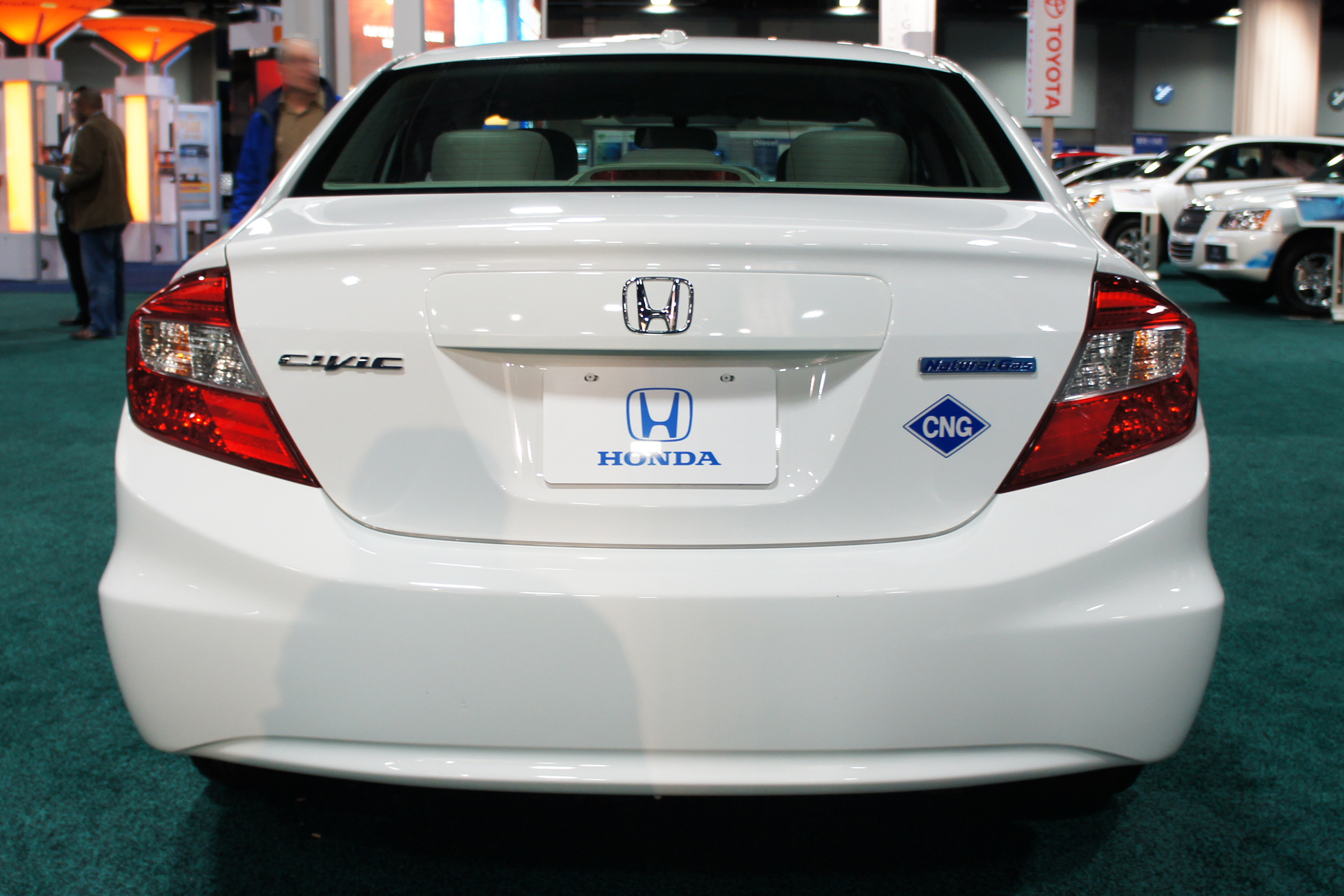
- 2012 Honda Civic GX

Overview
- Model years: 2012-2015
- Assembly: Greensburg, Indiana (HMI)

Body and chassis
- Related: Honda Civic (ninth generation)

Powertrain
- Engine: 1.8L I4
- Transmission: 5-speed automatic

Dimensions
- Wheelbase: 105.1 in (2,670 mm)
- Length: 177.3 in (4,503 mm) (2012); 179.4 in (4,557 mm) (2013-2015)
- Width: 69.0 in (1,753 mm)
- Height: 56.5 in (1,435 mm)

The Honda Civic GX is the only car factory-built to run on compressed natural gas (CNG) in the United States available to non-fleet customers. The GX was based on the Honda Civic and available for fleet sales in all 50 states. It was previously available for retail sales in four states (California, New York, Utah and Oklahoma), but later was made available to retail consumers in 35 states throughout the United States. The GX was manufactured in Honda's Greensburg, Indiana plant together with the production of conventional Civics from late 2009. It was previously produced in East Liberty, Ohio.

The third generation GX was awarded the 2012 Green Car of the Year by the Green Car Journal in November 2011 at the Los Angeles Auto Show. For eight years up to 2011, the Civic GX was rated first by the American Council for an Energy-Efficient Economy in the "Greenest Vehicle of the Year" list (excluding the years 2001, 2002, 2003, and 2006 when the Honda Insight hybrid topped the list) For 2012 the GX was surpassed by the Mitsubishi i-MiEV. For 2014, the GX ranked 10th, after several hybrids and electric vehicles. 2015 was the last model year for the Civic GX.

== History ==
The Honda Civic GX first appeared in 1998 as a factory-modified Civic LX that had been designed to run exclusively on CNG (compressed natural gas). In 1998 the Civic GX cost $4500 more than a comparable Civic LX. The car looked and drove just like a contemporary Honda Civic LX, but did not run on gasoline. In 2001, the Civic GX was rated the cleanest-burning internal combustion engine in the world by the EPA.

The GX was first leased to the City of Los Angeles to be used by parking enforcement officers and other city employees as a live pre-production test. The GX followed the same model year design changes as the Civic LX model, until the model year 2001 when a CVT (continuously variable transmission) was introduced in place of the 4-speed automatic transmission. In the 2006 year model, the GX again was equipped with the automatic 5-speed transmission, which improved its fuel economy and extended its range to 250 miles. In 1998 the GX was available for special order in some states to consumers, California and Colorado in particular.

In 2006, the Civic went through its greatest modification since its inception. All variants of the Civic were awarded the 2006 Motor Trend "Car of the Year" award. The 8th generation Civic remained unchanged from 2006 and was also available in the GX model. The GX was a limited-availability car, with fewer than a thousand units per year being produced by the factory.

In October 2006, the 2007 Civic GX became available in New York. In July 2009, the GX became available to the public in Utah. In April 2010 the GX became available to the public in Oklahoma. The CNG Civic in this market is related to favorable natural gas costs and the numerous high-pressure filling stations. The promotion of CNG conversions by natural gas producers headquartered in Oklahoma provided an incentive for Honda to market the Civic GX there. State of Oklahoma incentives were a factor that led United Parcel Service to convert part of their delivery truck fleet to CNG. After December 2010, the GX was available for fleet sales in all 50 states. Retail sales were expanded to 35 states in the fall of 2011.

The last model year for the Civic CNG was 2015. The company said it had sold about 16,000 natural-gas vehicles since the model was introduced, mainly to taxi and commercial fleets. American Honda Motor Company executive vice president John Mendel commented that Honda was phasing out efforts to develop natural-gas powered vehicles and would instead focus on hybrids and electric vehicles. He cited the lack of a CNG fueling infrastructure in the United States as the main reason for the decision to stop producing the Civic CNG. "The infrastructure, while it improved, just wasn't as convenient as petrol," Mendel said. "We gave it a pretty long run and we tried and tried and tried."

== Specifications ==
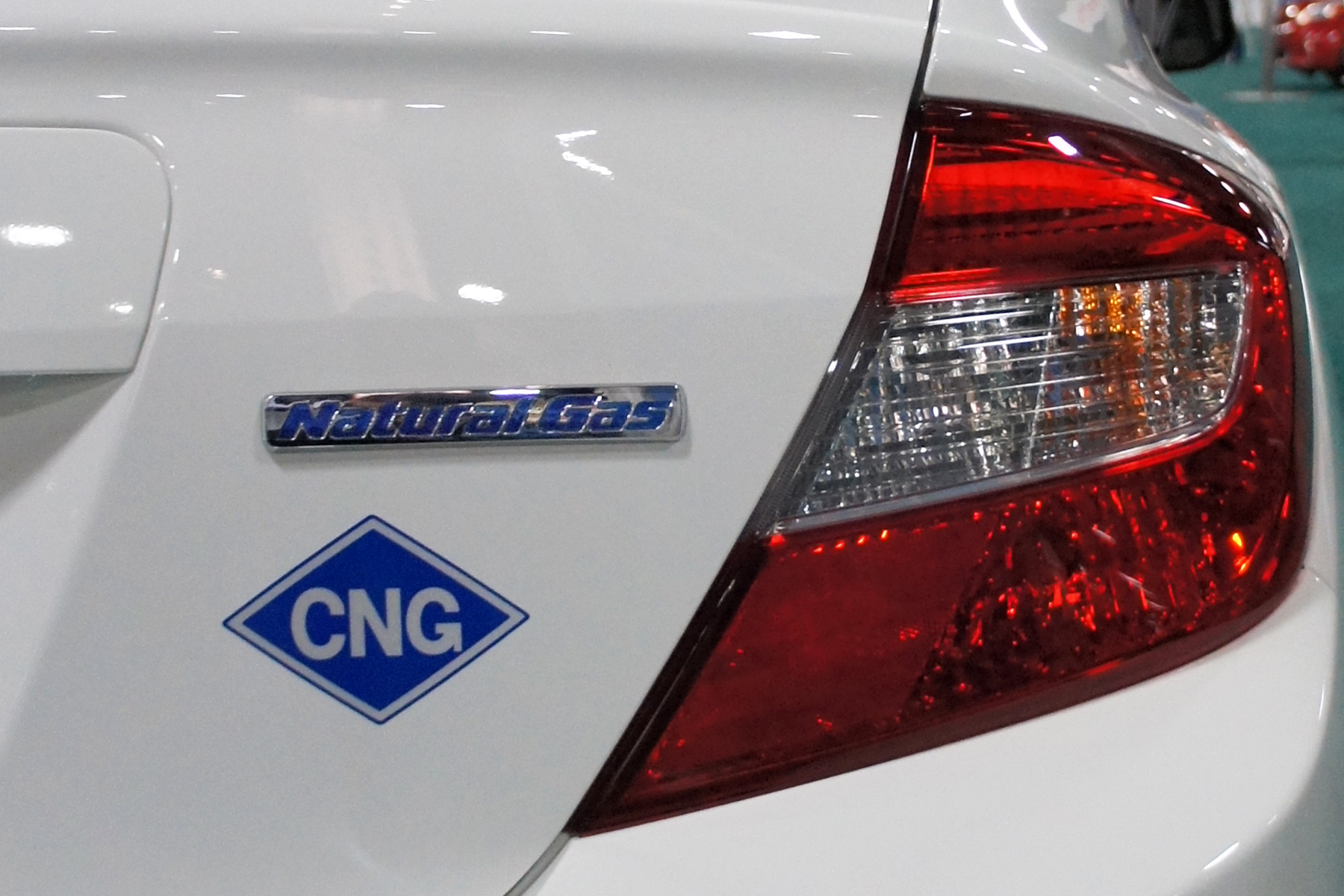
2012 Honda Civic GX with the blue diamond CNG sticker and the new natural gas badging

The GX was originally introduced with a 1.6 liter inline-four engine (I4). The 2001 model makeover carried a 1.7 liter engine. Beginning in model-year 2006, the 1.8 liter inline four-cylinder engine was introduced to the civic lineup. The compression ratio in the Civic GX is 12.5:1, higher than that of most United States gasoline-powered automobiles. The significantly higher compression ratio is usable without detonation due to the 120-octane natural gas that powers the car. Acceleration of the 2012 Civic Natural Gas is less than that of the comparable 4-door 2012 LX model due to both lower power (110 hp vs. 140 hp) and heavier weight (2848 lbs vs 2705 lbs). Times from a standing start to 60 miles per hour (100 km/h) have been clocked at 12.6 seconds.

The cylinder containing the high-pressure fuel is carried in the trunk of the car and holds 8.0 gasoline gallon equivalent (GGE) at 3,600 psi (250 bar).

Range on a full 250 bar or 3,600 psi fill is variable, depending on driving conditions and driving technique. While Honda claims an estimated 225–250 miles (362–402 km) from a full CNG tank, independent tests have found lower ranges of 180–200 miles (290–320 km) and "just over 200 miles" (about 320 km). There were improvements in the 2012 EPA fuel economy as the range increased to 225–250 miles or 362–402 km. The EPA rates the 2009 Honda Civic GX at 24 equivalent miles per gallon (MPG) city and 36 equivalent MPG highway. Independent tests with mixed driving usage found rates of "nearly 32" and 26.8 equivalent MPG. The estimated fuel cost for this vehicle to drive 40 kilometers or 25 miles in a combination of city and highway driving is US$1.47 using CNG, based on an average fuel price of US$1.93 per gasoline equivalent gallon (121.5 cubic feet).

The GX qualifies for high-occupancy vehicle lane (HOV) access in California, Arizona, Utah, and other states.

== Home refueling ==
Home refueling is available for the GX with the addition of the Phill Home Refueling Appliance. This unit attaches to a home or commercial natural gas source, and compresses the gas into the car's tank through an attached hose. The unit requires a 240-volt power source, and uses 800 watts when in operation.

Honda did not recommend utilizing home refueling options due to possible moisture and chemical contamination of some natural gas supplies. Honda reserved the right to void the warranty of a car needing service based on inspection of the fuel system for contamination.

== Recognition ==
In 2000 the Civic GX rated first in the "Greenest Vehicle of the Year" list by the American Council for an Energy-Efficient Economy. It ranked cleaner than the General Motors EV1. It was dethroned by the SULEV-rated Honda Insight hybrid a year later.

The GX again ranked No. 1 after the Insight, sold from 2007 to 2011, was discontinued. In 2012 it was beaten by the i-MiEV from Mitsubishi. In 2014, the GX ranked 10th, after several hybrids and electric vehicles.

The 2012 Honda Civic GX was awarded the 2012 Green Car of the Year by the Green Car Journal in November 2011 at the Los Angeles Auto Show.

== See also ==
- Compressed Gas Association
- Compressed natural gas
- Honda Civic Hybrid
- Liquefied natural gas (LNG)
