= Honda Canada =

Honda Canada may refer to:

- Honda Canada Inc., distributor
- Honda of Canada Manufacturing, manufacturer
