= Honda Domani =

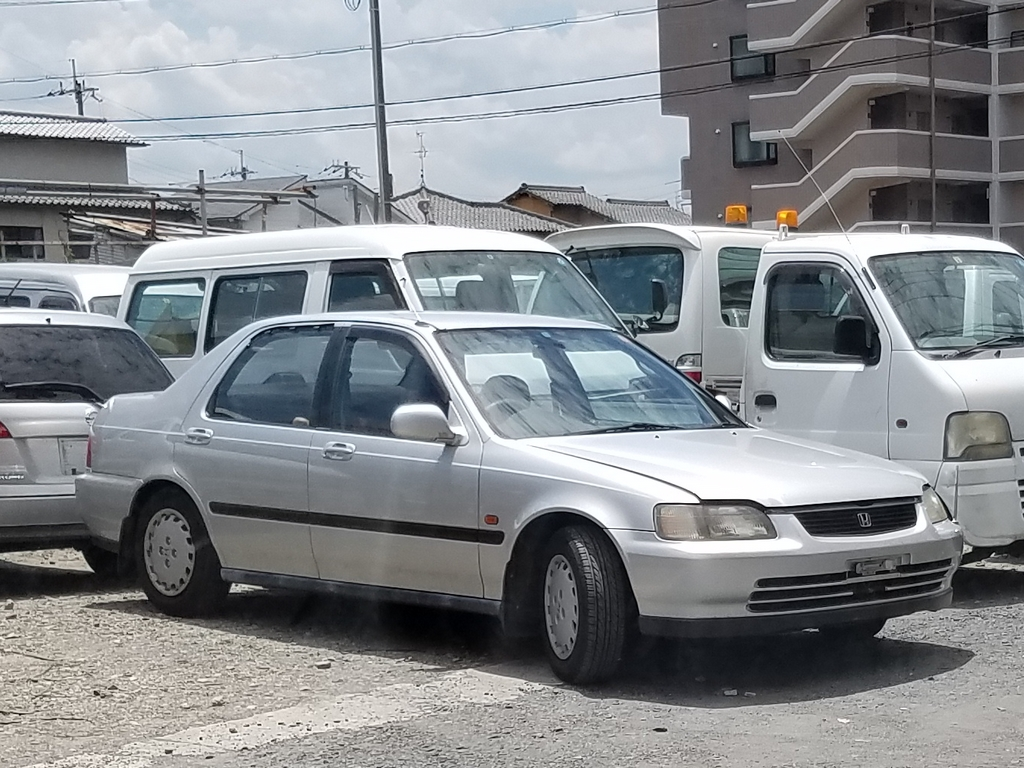
- First generation Domani sedan

Overview
- Also called: Isuzu Gemini; Honda Civic (Europe)

Body and chassis
- Class: Subcompact car (B); Subcompact executive car (C)
- Body style: 4-door sedan
- Layout: Front-engine, front-wheel drive/four-wheel-drive

Chronology
- Predecessor: Honda Concerto
- Successor: Honda Fit Aria; Honda Civic

The Honda Domani (ホンダ・ドマーニ) is a car made by Honda and marketed in east Asia, including Japan. The car was mutually developed during Rover's collaboration with Honda. It was introduced on 4 November 1992, replacing the Concerto in Honda's lineup, although that model lasted until 1995 in Europe.

The Domani was another example of Honda taking one product and selling multiple versions at different dealership sales channels in Japan, called Honda Clio for the more upscale Domani, Honda Integra SJ at Honda Verno locations from 1996 to 2000.

This was while Honda Primo sold the mechanically identical but aesthetically different Civic Ferio, along with the Civic three and five door hatchbacks. "Domani" is Italian for "tomorrow". In Japan, the Domani was also rebadged as the Isuzu Gemini.

== First generation: MA4-7 (1992–1997) ==
Honda Domani
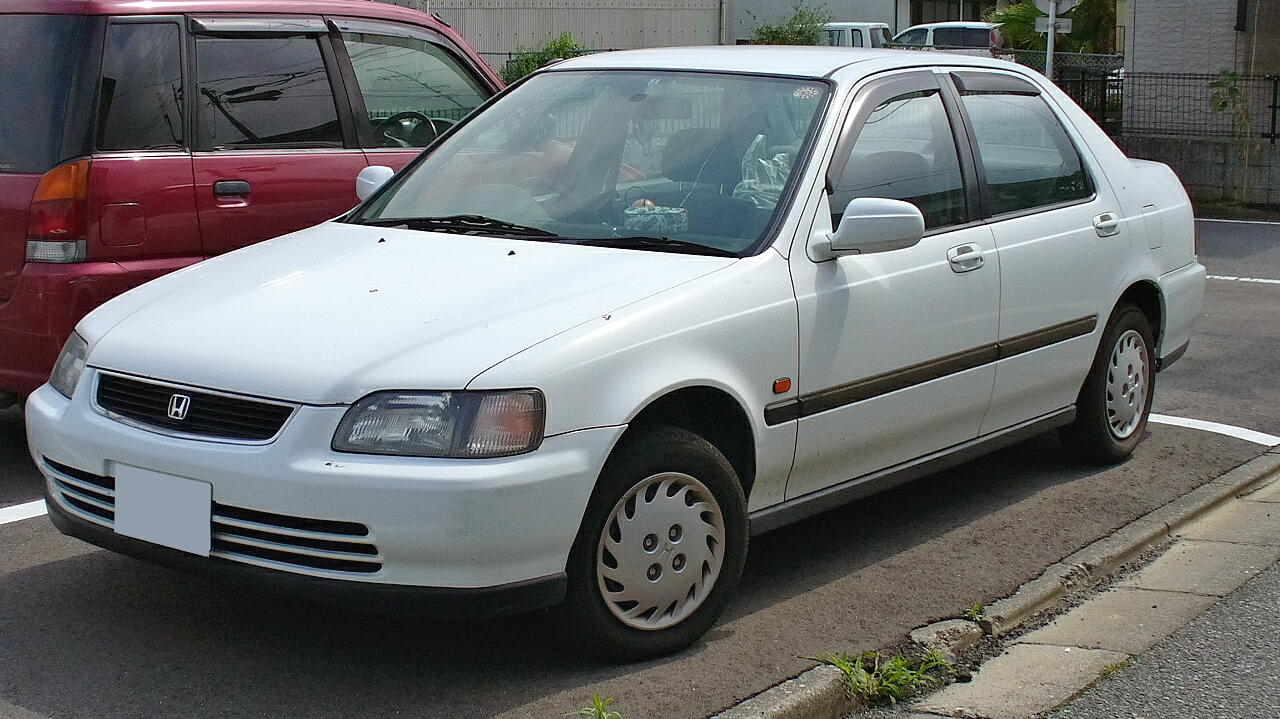

Overview
- Also called: Honda Integra SJ; Honda Civic MA/MB/MC
- Production: 1992–1997
- Assembly: Suzuka Plant, Suzuka, Mie, Japan

Body and chassis
- Class: Subcompact car
- Related: Honda Civic; Rover 400; MG ZS

Powertrain
- Engine: 1.5 L D15B SOHC I4; 1.6 L ZC SOHC I4; 1.8 L B18B2 DOHC I4
- Transmission: 4-speed automatic 5-speed manual

Dimensions
- Wheelbase: 2,620 mm (103.1 in)
- Length: 4,415 mm (173.8 in)
- Width: 1,695 mm (66.7 in)
- Height: 1,410 mm (55.5 in)
- Curb weight: 1,140 kg (2,513 lb)

It is mechanically identical to the early 1990s version of the Honda Civic (chassis code EG) and production ended in 1997. The Domani sedan had 1.6-liter and 1.8-liter engines at first (from 1992 to 1997), and also a 1.5-liter gasoline engine from 1994 onwards. It was offered as a four-door sedan only, in Ri, Vi, Si, Si G and Ri F trims. The Si and Si G had the 1.8-liter engine installed.

In Europe, five-door hatchback and wagon variants were available, replacing the Concerto sedan and five-door hatchback. The United Kingdom received two VTi trims of the Domani ("Civic"), chassis codes MB6 (five-door hatch) and MC2 (five-door estate) with the 1.8-litre DOHC VTEC B18C4 4-cylinder engine. They were sold there as the Honda Civic.

The version for Japan also was available with Honda's Real-Time Four Wheel Drive System, especially on RiF models.

The Honda Domani has a very close relative in the saloon of the Rover 400, with which it shared virtually all its main components. Renamed the Rover 45 when facelifted in the end of 1999, it was also sold as the MG ZS from August 2001. The Rover/MG derivatives were produced, with numerous facelifts, until the Rover Group went into administration in April 2005, by which time the design was thirteen years old.

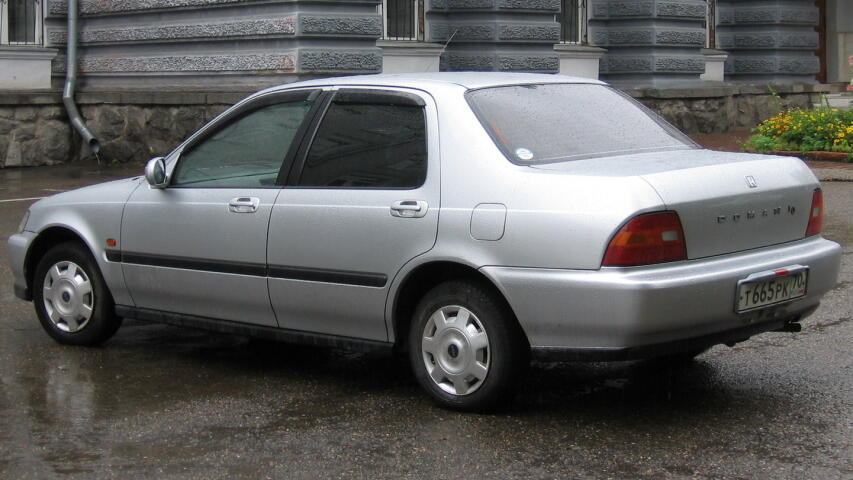
Rear

== Second generation: MB3-5 (1997–2000) ==
Honda Domani
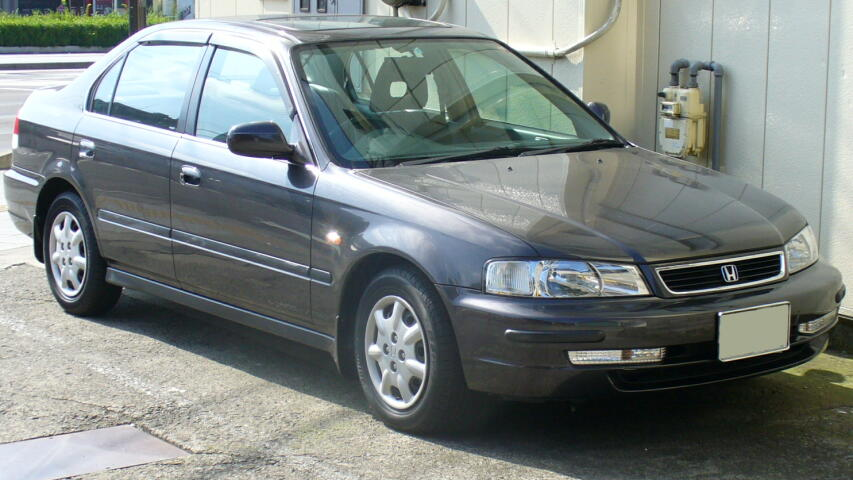

Overview
- Also called: Acura EL
- Production: 1997–2000

Powertrain
- Engine: 1.5 L D15B SOHC I4; 1.6 L D16A SOHC I4
- Transmission: 4-speed automatic 5-speed manual

Dimensions
- Wheelbase: 2,620 mm (103.1 in)
- Length: 4,480 mm (176.4 in)
- Width: 1,695 mm (66.7 in)
- Height: 1,390 mm (54.7 in)
- Curb weight: 1,160 kg (2,557 lb)

The second generation was introduced on January 31, 1997. It was based on the EK Civic.

In Japan, the second-generation Domani was introduced in four variants: X, G, and G 4WD, all equipped with the D16A engine, and the E variant, featuring the 15B engine. Each variant included SRS airbag systems for both the driver and passenger seats. The X variant came with an ABS system as standard, while ABS was available as an optional feature for the other models.

A version for the market of Canada of the second generation Domani was built alongside the Civic in Alliston, Ontario, called the Acura 1.6 EL. This car was also exported back to Japan and Taiwan as the Honda Domani. In Japan, the Domani was replaced by the Honda Fit Aria as the compact sedan at Honda Clio dealerships for the model year of 2002. In 2006, the EL is replaced by the Acura CSX in Canada.

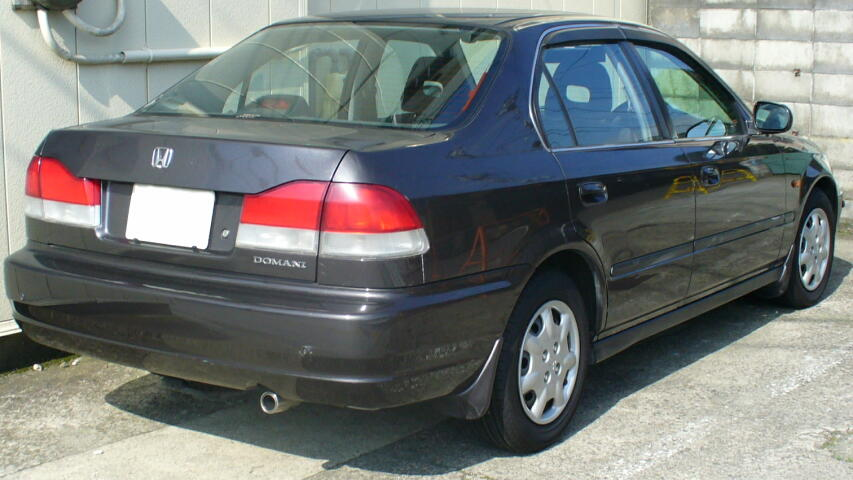
Rear

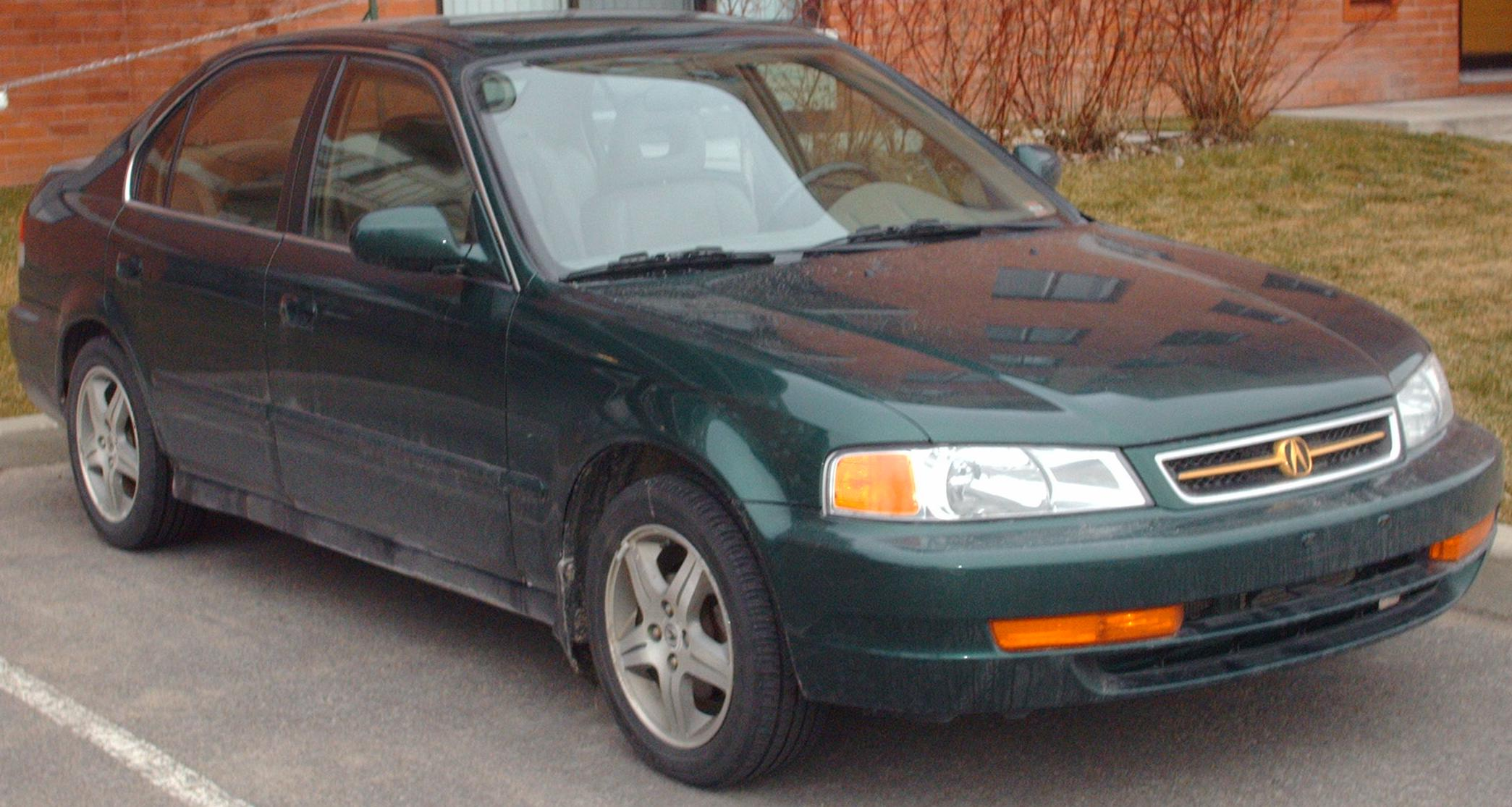
Acura 1.6 EL (front)

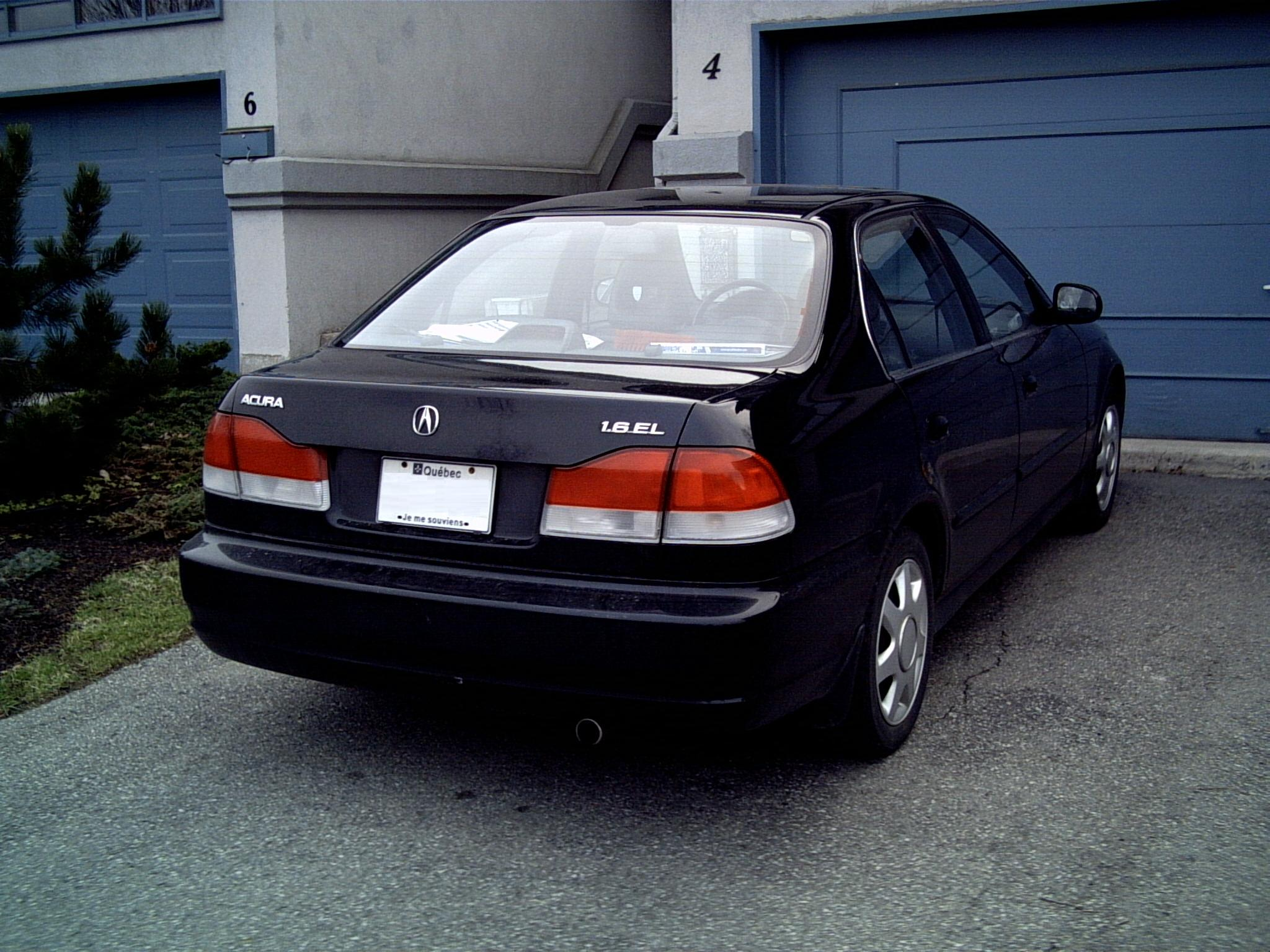
Acura 1.6 EL (rear)
