= Honda Canada Inc. =

Automobile manufacturer

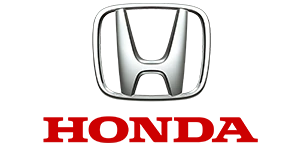
- Industry: Automotive
- Founded: 1969; 57 years ago
- Headquarters: Markham, Ontario
- Key people: Dave Jamieson, President & CEO
- Owner: Honda Motor Company
- Website: www.honda.ca

Honda Canada Inc. is the Canadian regional subsidiary of the Honda Motor Company. Founded in 1969, Honda has been building cars in Canada since 1986 in Alliston, Ontario and head office in Markham, Ontario.

== Sales ==
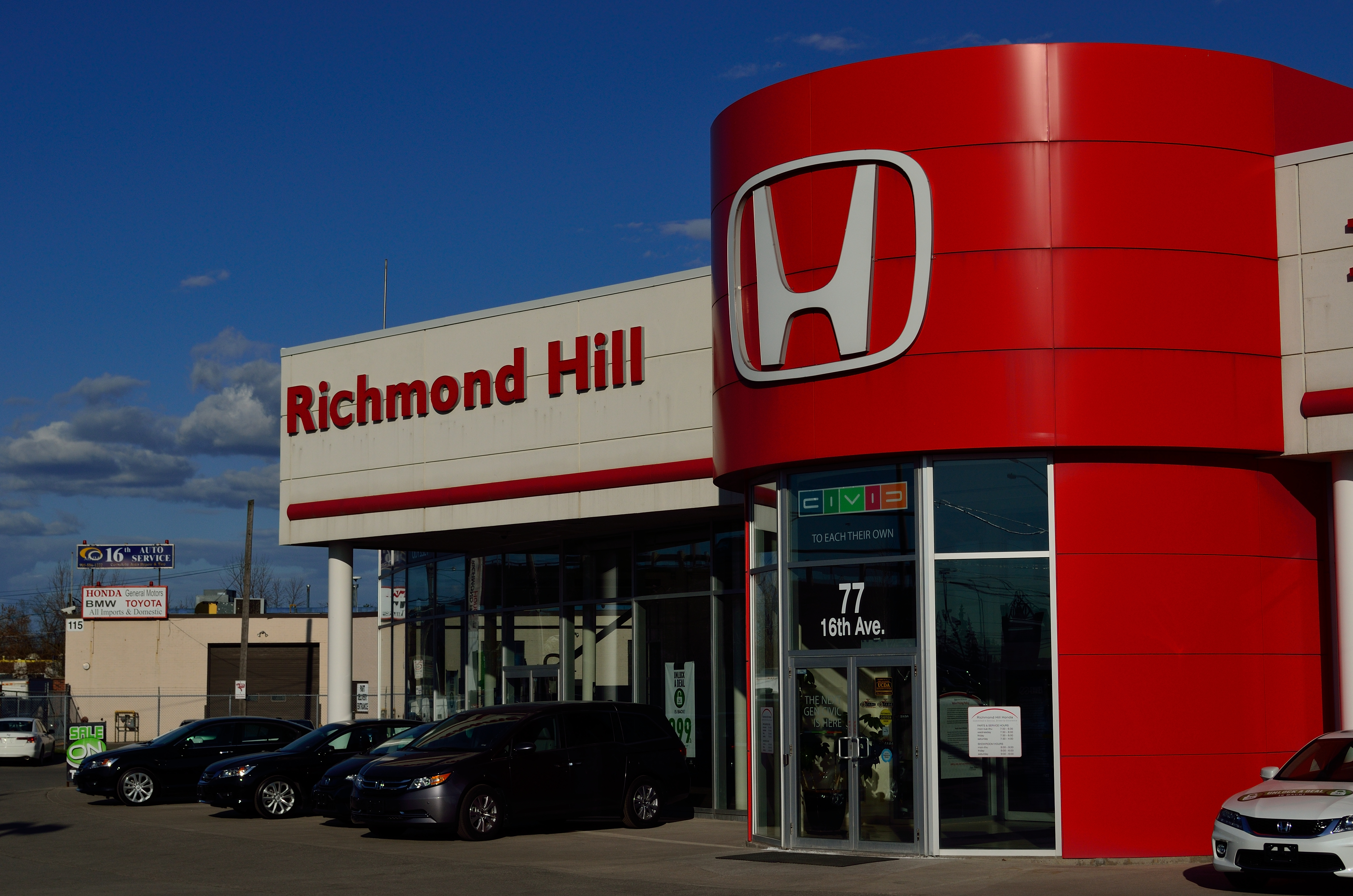
Honda dealership in Richmond Hill, Ontario

Motorcycles were the first Honda products sold. It was not until 1973 that cars were sold in Canada. The first car dealership, Honda de Sigi, was opened by German entrepreneur Siegfried Bauer in downtown Montreal followed by a second dealership in Laval.

Honda Canada Inc. supports a network of 237 Honda and 51 Acura authorized automotive dealers in Canada. There are over 600 dealers for Honda motorcycles, scooters, mopeds, snowblowers, lawnmowers and other equipment in Canada. Its financial services arm, Honda Canada Finance Inc. (HCFI), was established in 1987.

=== Vehicles ===
- Honda Civic
- Honda CR-V
- Honda HR-V
- Honda Accord
- Honda Fit
- Honda Odyssey
- Honda Pilot
- Honda Ridgeline
- Honda Insight
- Honda Clarity
- Honda Civic Type R

== Offices ==
The first zone office was established in Montreal, Quebec in 1972, along with a regional office in Dartmouth, Nova Scotia. The Richmond, British Columbia zone office opened in 1984. An advanced technical training centre was opened in Boucherville, Quebec in 1991 with 15,000 square metres of space for the third new Quebec zone office.

Honda Canada Inc. purchased land in Richmond Hill, Ontario with the intent to build a new corporate headquarters there. When infrastructure disagreements with the municipal government could not be resolved, those plans were scrapped. Subsequently, a new facility (designated a LEEDs showcase building) was built in Markham.

== Manufacturing ==
In 1986, Honda opened a manufacturing plant in Alliston, Ontario in an effort to build vehicles locally. Since then, Honda opened a second plant in 1998, and an engine plant in 2008.

=== Domestic automobile production ===
Currently produced in Canada

- Honda Civic (1988–present)
- Honda CR-V (2012–present)

Previously produced

- Honda Accord (1986–1988)
- Honda Pilot (2002–2008, production moved to Honda Manufacturing of Alabama)
- Honda Odyssey (1998–2004, production moved to Honda Manufacturing of Alabama)
- Honda Ridgeline (2004–2009, production moved to Honda Manufacturing of Alabama)
- Acura EL (1996–2005)
- Acura CSX (2005–2011)
- Acura MDX (2000–2013, moved to Honda Manufacturing of Alabama in April 2013)
- Acura ZDX (2009–2013)
