= Honda Manufacturing of Indiana =

Car production factory in Indiana

Coordinates: 39.3673°N 85.5449°W

Honda Manufacturing of Indiana, LLC
- Type: Division of Honda
- Founded: March 19, 2007
- Headquarters: 2755 N Michigan Ave; Greensburg, Indiana
- Area served: United States
- Key people: Yuzo Uenohara, President
- Products: See below
- Number of employees: 2,700
- Parent: Honda
- Website: https://indiana.honda.com

Honda Manufacturing of Indiana (HMIN), also called Indiana Auto Plant (IAP), is a car production factory located in Greensburg, Indiana. It builds vehicles for Honda sales in North America. It was founded on March 19, 2007, for the 25th anniversary of the company's own automobile production in the United States. Vehicle production commenced on October 9, 2008, and over two million automobiles have been produced by the plant since that time. Approximately 2,700 people were employed at Honda Manufacturing of Indiana as of 2021.

The current product line of the plant includes the Honda Civic hatchback, and the Honda CR-V. Production capacity is 250,000 vehicles annually. Honda announced in March 2023 it planned to move all production of the Honda Accord to the plant by 2025.

With regard to the purchase of green electricity and the use of wood from the nearby Forest Stewardship Council to heat the hall, the plant received an award from the Green Building Certification Institute. After two years of production, the HMIN received the second award, LEED certification, which is based on the successful use of various recycling technologies.

== Manufactured vehicles ==
=== Current ===
- Honda Civic (2008–present)
- Honda CR-V (2017–present)

=== Previous ===
- Honda Civic GX NGV (natural gas vehicle)
- Acura ILX (Apr 2012 - Nov 2014)
- Honda Insight (2018-2022)
