= Honda Concerto =

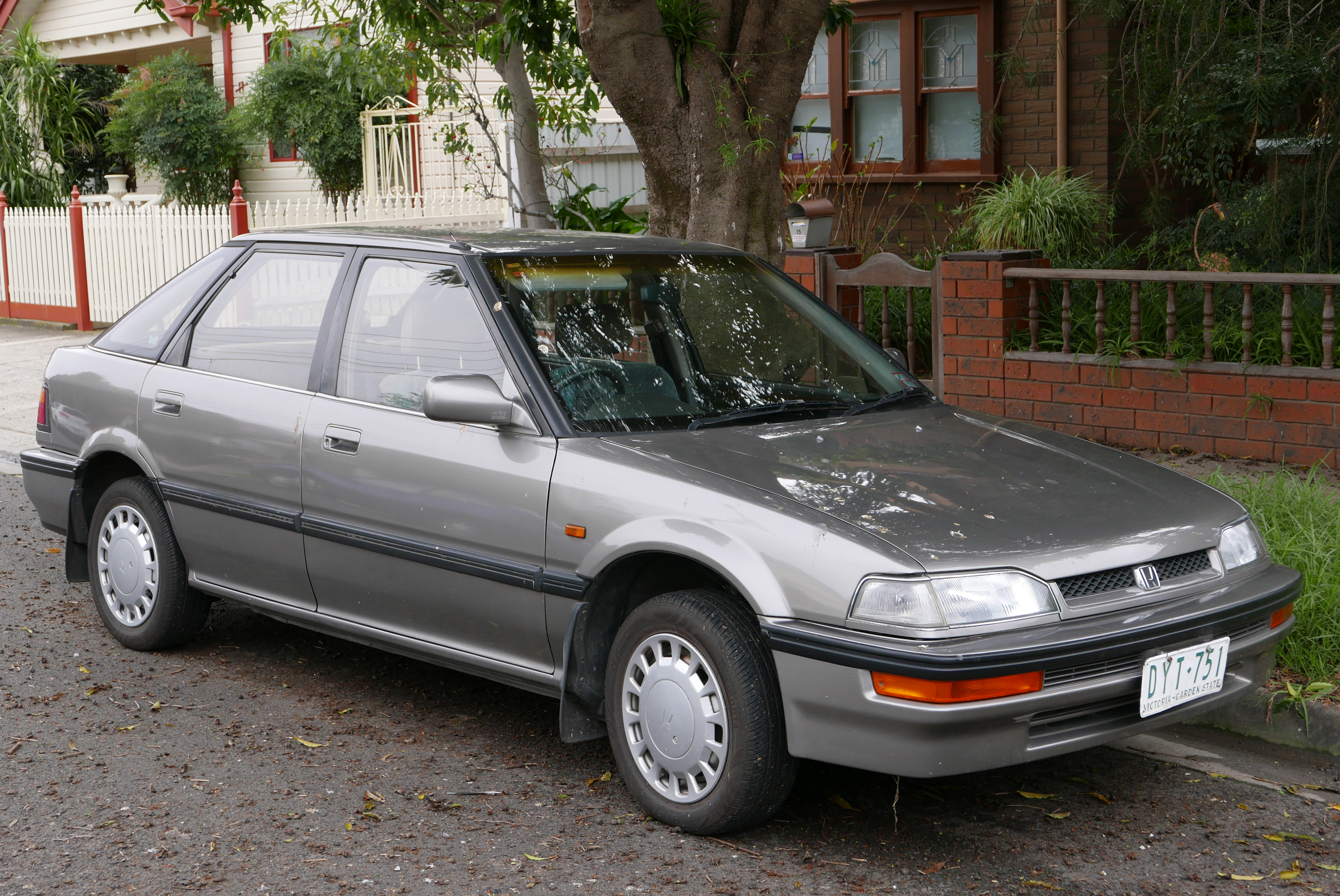
- 1989 Honda Concerto EX-i hatchback (MA2, Australia)

Overview
- Also called: Rover 400; Rover 200
- Production: June 1988 – October 1992 (Japan); October 1989–1995 (UK)
- Assembly: Japan: Suzuka, Mie (Suzuka Plant: Japanese- and Australasian-market cars); United Kingdom: Longbridge, Birmingham (Longbridge plant: European-market cars)
- Designer: Yutaka Ikeda (1985)

Body and chassis
- Body style: 4-door saloon; 5-door liftback
- Layout: FF layout/AWD
- Related: Honda Civic

Powertrain
- Engine: 1.4 L D14A1 SOHC I4; 1.5 L D15B2 SOHC I4 (MA1); 1.6 L ZC SOHC I4 (MA2/3); 1.6 L D16Z1/Z2 SOHC I4; 1.6 L ZC DOHC I4 (MA2/3); 1.6 L D16A8/A9/Z4 DOHC I4; 1.8 L PSA XUD7 TE turbodiesel I4
- Transmission: 5-speed manual 4-speed automatic

Dimensions
- Wheelbase: 2,550 mm (100.4 in)
- Length: 4,415 mm (173.8 in) (saloon); 4,265 mm (167.9 in) (liftback)
- Width: 1,690 mm (66.5 in))
- Height: 1,415 mm (55.7 in)
- Curb weight: 1,200 kg (2,646 lb)

Chronology
- Predecessor: Honda Ballade (saloon); Honda Quint (liftback)
- Successor: Honda Domani (Japan); Honda Civic MA/MB/MC (Europe)

The Honda Concerto is a compact car (C-segment) manufactured by Honda from 1988 until 1996. Designed to aim at European tastes, it was jointly developed by Honda and the Austin Rover Group and was introduced in Japan on 15 June 1988, and in European markets in October 1989. Japanese production finished in October 1992 and British production finished in 1995 (although a rebadged Rover diesel with Honda Concerto badging continued to be built until late 1996). The car was named for the musical composition and was a successor to the second generation Honda Ballade, a higher specification Honda Civic. All Japanese versions were exclusive to Japanese Honda dealerships called Honda Clio.

== Production and delivery ==
The Concerto was sold in both liftback and saloon styles and built in two locations: Austin Rover's Longbridge plant for the European market, and by Honda in Suzuka, Mie, Japan.

Japanese production began in June 1988, originally only as a front-wheel drive saloon. The liftback and four-wheel drive saloon became available one month later, in July 1988. European deliveries, meanwhile, only began after British Concerto production commenced at the end of 1989. The Europe-only models, such as the 1.4, were released in October 1989. In Australia and some European countries, for example Germany and Switzerland, it was only sold as a five-door liftback so as to not compete internally with the four-door Civic saloon. In many European markets it acted as replacement for the slow-selling Honda Integra five-door liftback. The saloon version was produced until 1993 for most nations, especially in the United Kingdom, where sales were lower compared to the more upscale Rover 200 and Rover 400 Series. Honda intended for the car to appeal to European tastes.

== Specifications ==
The Japanese-built models – MA1 (1.5-liter), MA2 (1.6-liter), and MA3 (1.6-liter 4WD) – were produced with double wishbone suspension whilst the British-built model, HW, were produced with MacPherson struts.

Engine choices were:

- 1.4 Liter (SOHC twin carb) with 88 PS (65 kW) at 6,300 rpm (Europe)
- 1.5 Liter (SOHC 2-barrel carb) with 91 PS (67 kW) at 6,000 rpm (Japan)
- 1.5 Liter (SOHC DPI) with 90 PS (66 kW) at 6,000 rpm (Europe)
- 1.6 Liter (SOHC twin carb) with 106 PS (78 kW) at 6,300 rpm (105 PS in Japan)
- 1.6 Liter (SOHC MPI) with 111 PS (82 kW) at 6,300 rpm (120 PS in Japan, Australia)
- 1.6 Liter (DOHC MPI) with 122 PS (90 kW) at 6,800 rpm (130 PS in Japan; European models without catalyst: 130 PS DIN with manual transmission and 124 PS DIN with automatic transmission)
- 1.8 Liter turbodiesel with 88 PS (65 kW) DIN at 4,300 rpm (Peugeot-supplied engine in badge-engineered Rover 200)

The four-door saloon was offered with four-wheel drive in Japan, a system later shared with the Civic-based compact SUV, the Honda CR-V. The Japanese range received a facelift in February 1991, when the twin-cam ZC engine was also added to the JZ-Si model. The facelift included new taillights and a more upright front design, with more bulbous headlights.

The Concerto was based on a platform which was shared with the popular Civic. Just like the five-door Integra it replaced, it offered more features than the Civic and was aimed at a more prestigious section of the market. The styling of the Concerto reflected an influence from the Honda Ascot, most notably the six-light window treatment of the greenhouse.

=== Concerto TD ===
For France, Italy, and Portugal only, markets where diesel engines were essential offerings, a turbodiesel Concerto was made available late in the model's life. In France, for instance, Rover's 200/400 series outsold the Concerto by a ratio of five-to-one, with diesels representing 80 percent of Rover sales. This model was a toe in the water for Honda, their first diesel-engined passenger car (aside from the 1993 Honda Jazz, a rebadged Isuzu only available in Japan).

The Concerto TD, however, was a badge-engineered Rover 218 SLD Turbo and thus has completely different sheetmetal from Honda's own Concertos. Introduced in August 1994, it was only available as a five-door liftback. In addition to the different appearance and interior (including the Rover's wood trim), the TD has Rover's MacPherson strut front suspension rather than Honda's typical double wishbone setup as used on petrol-engined Concertos. The only difference was emblems and hubcaps. As with the Rover 218 SLD, the Concerto TD was fitted with Peugeot's 1.8-liter XUD7 engine. While arriving very late, several years after the range had been replaced in Japan, its mission appears to have succeeded: the TD version represented 94 percent of French Concerto sales in 1995. Production ended in October 1996.

== Replacement ==
Honda stopped manufacturing the Concerto in Great Britain about a year after its partner, Rover, was taken over by BMW in 1994. Petrol-engined models were built there until 1995, while the Rover-based diesel lasted until October 1996. It was replaced by a new, Swindon-built five-door Honda Civic liftback, itself a rebadged version of the Honda Domani which had replaced the Concerto in Japan in 1992. The Civic liftback was quite different from the rest of the sixth generation Civic range as it, and the Domani, were based on the fifth generation (EG, EH) Civic's platform instead.

== Gallery ==
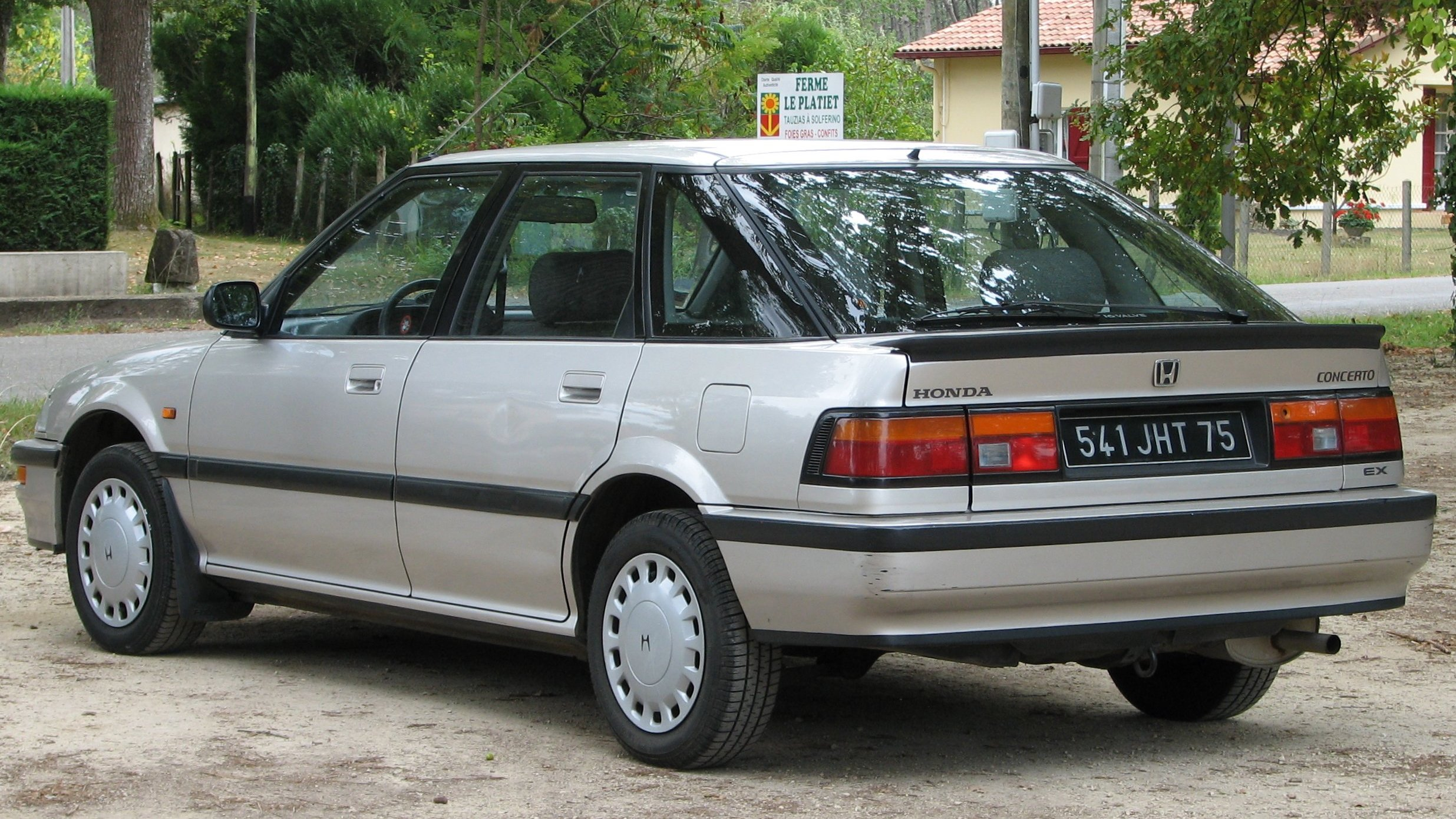
Honda Concerto liftback (Europe)

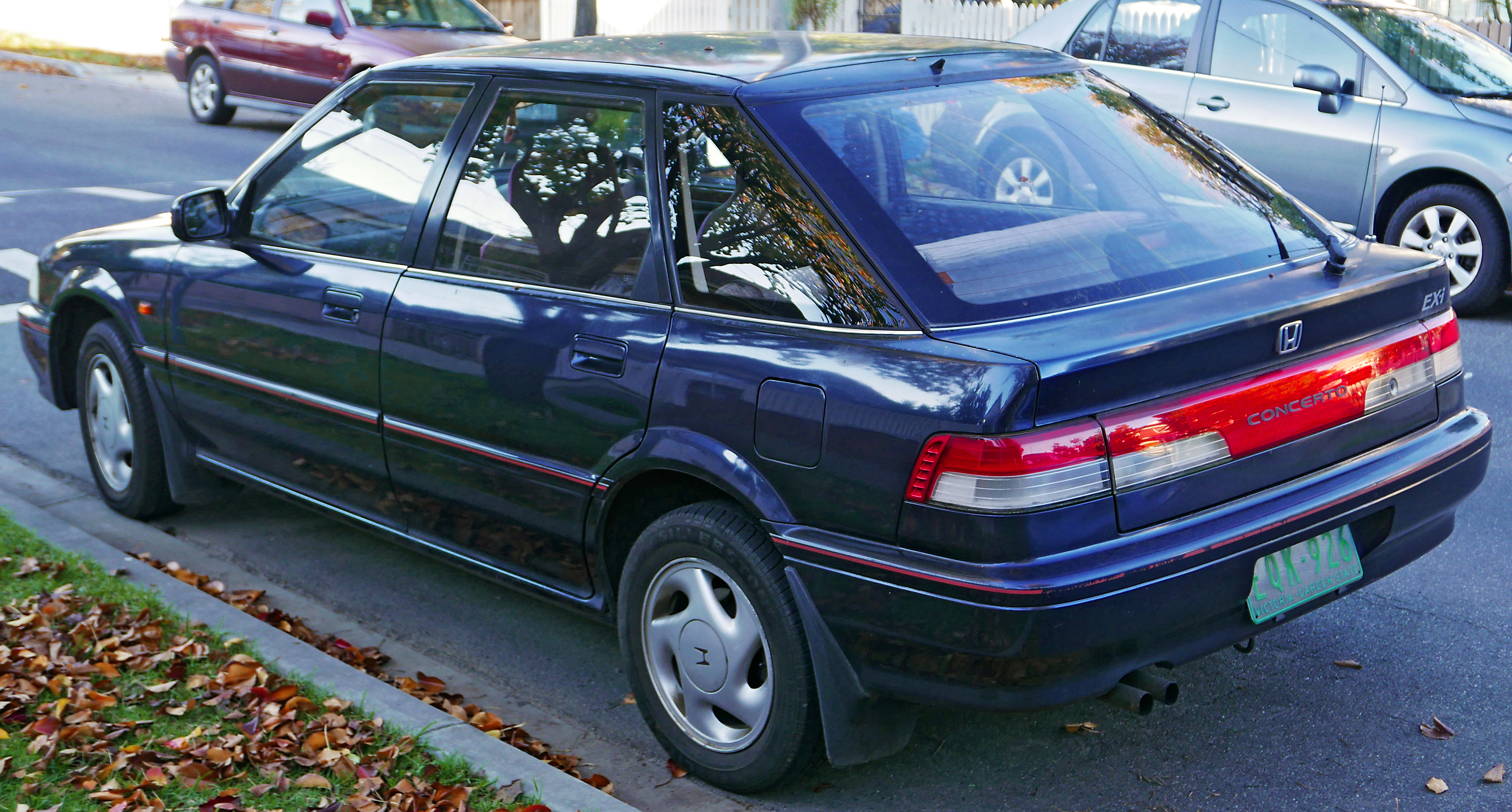
Honda Concerto liftback (Australia; facelift)

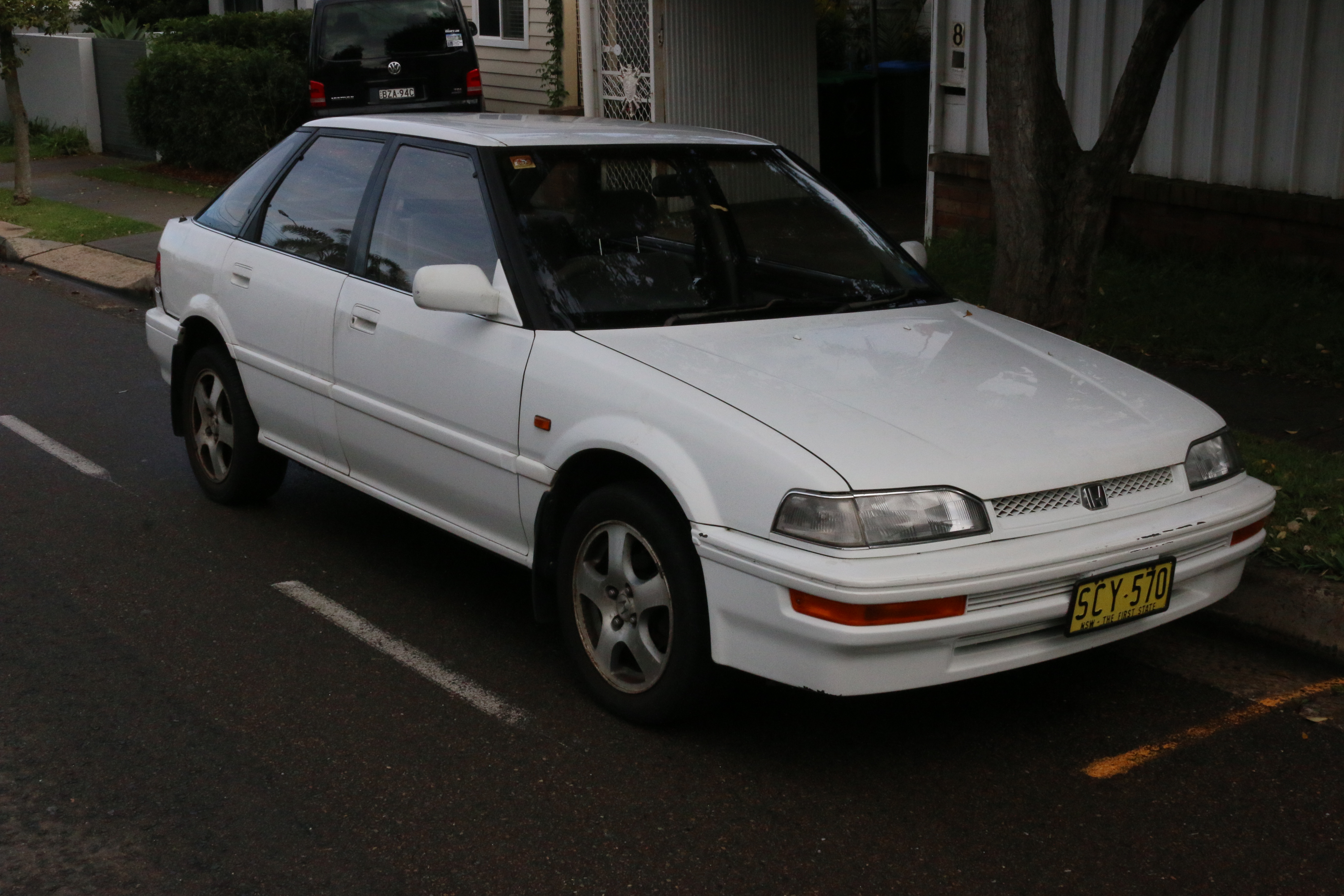
Honda Concerto liftback (Australia; pre-facelift)

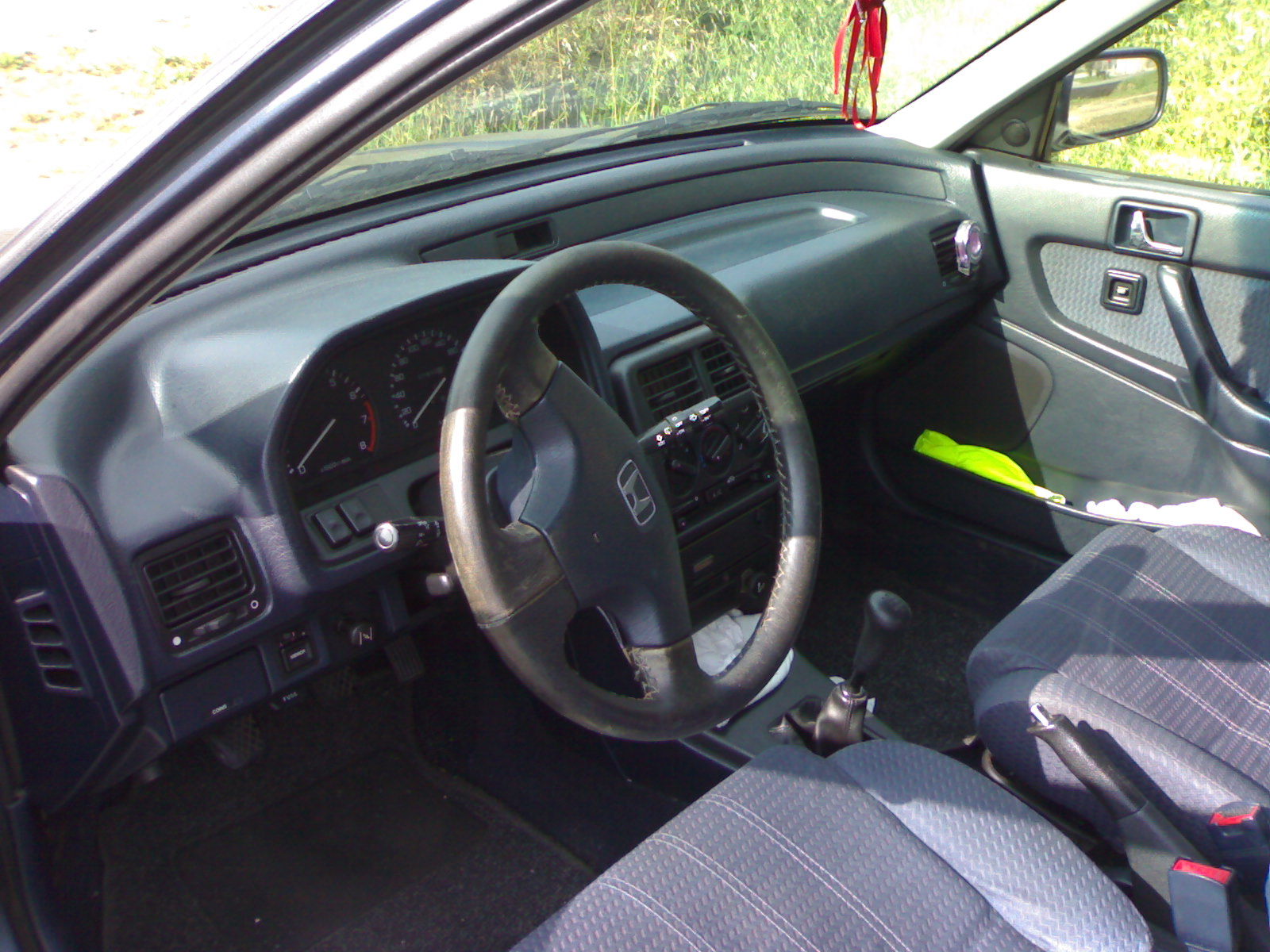
Interior

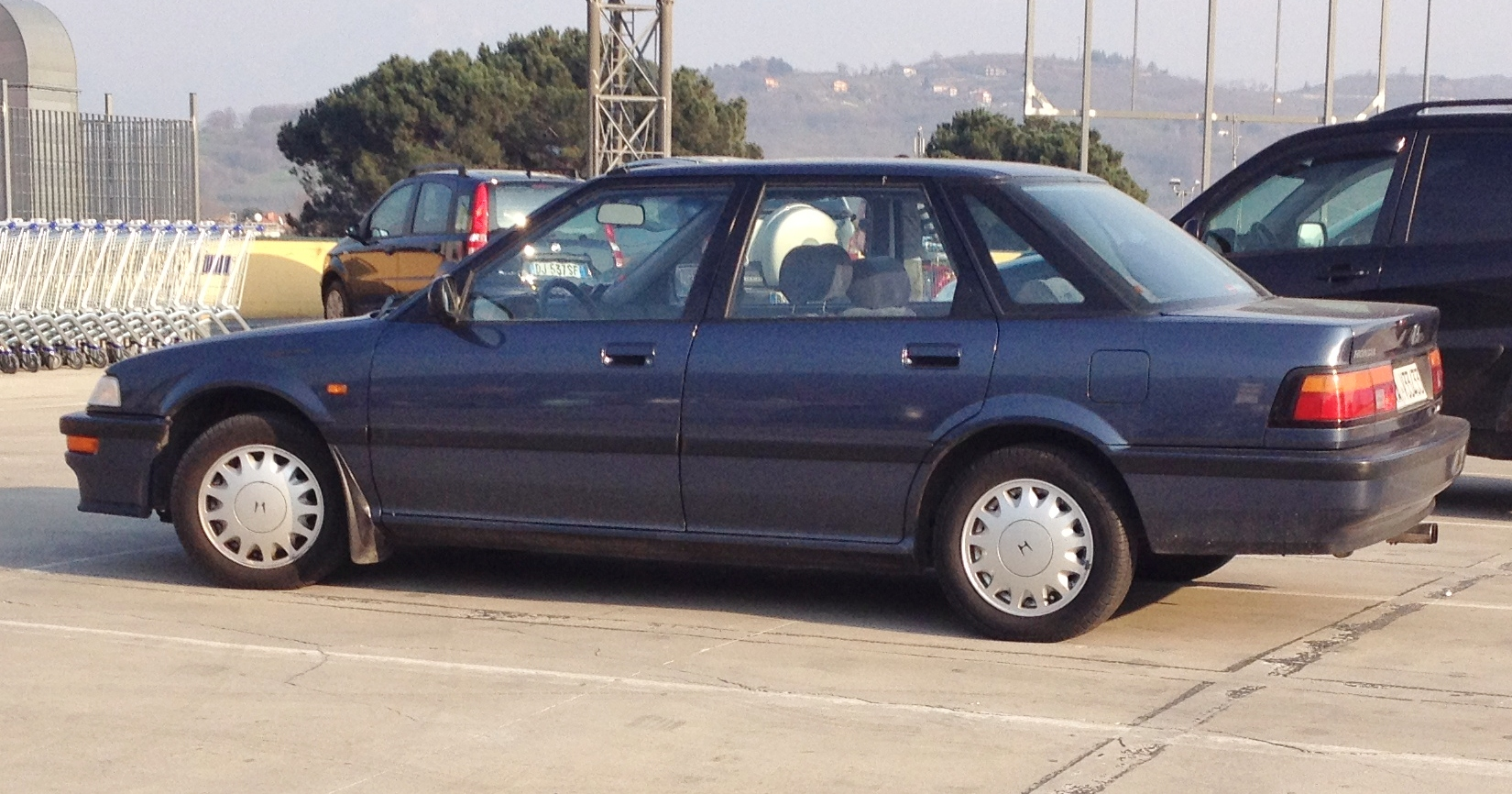
Honda Concerto saloon (Italy)

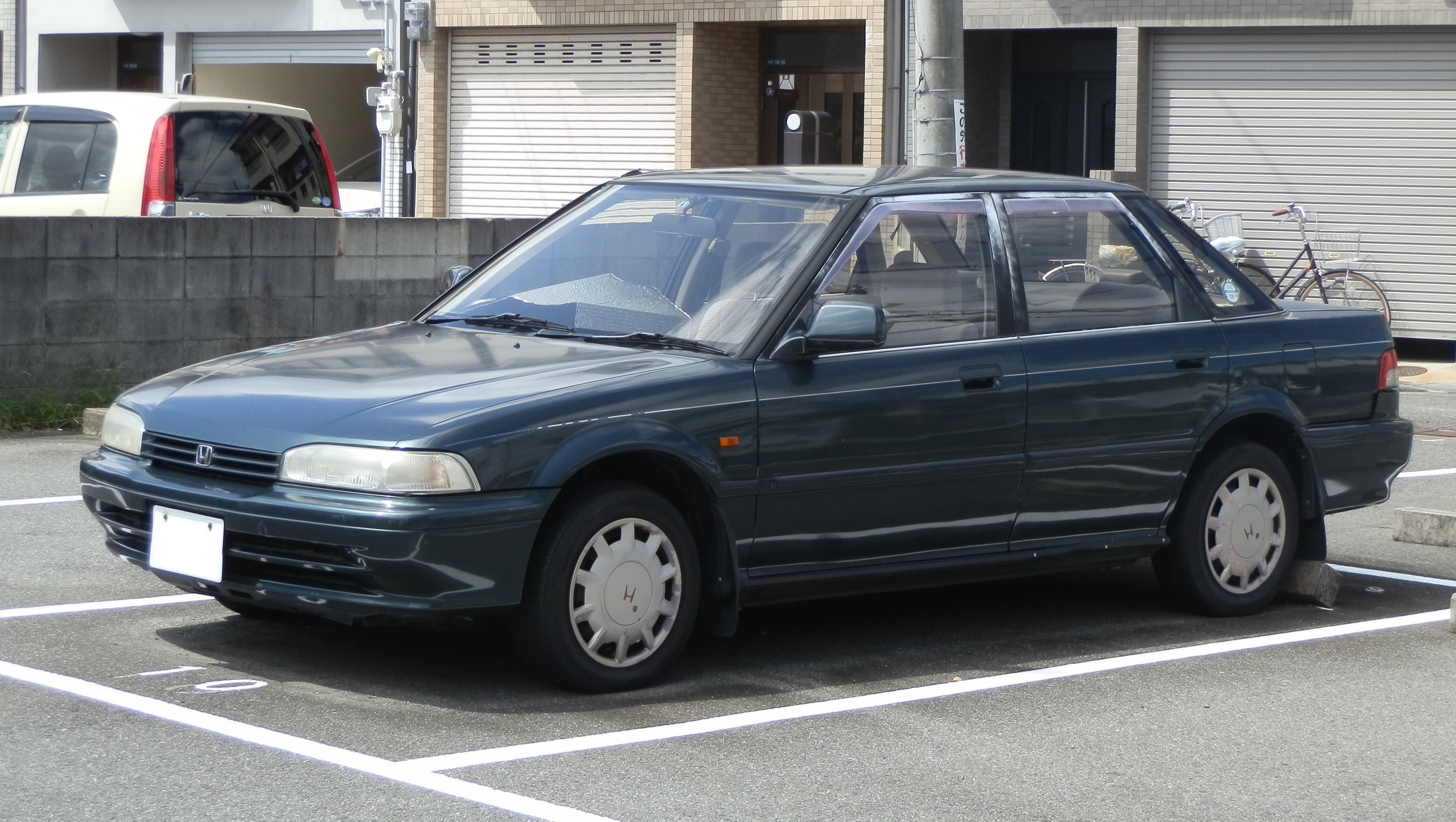
Honda Concerto saloon (JDM; facelift model)
