= Honda of Canada Manufacturing =

Automobile manufacturing division of Honda Canada Inc.

Coordinates: 44.14805°N 79.84509°W

Honda of Canada Manufacturing (French: Honda Canada Inc.) is the automobile manufacturing division of Honda Canada Inc. The plant is located in Alliston, Ontario, about 40 km (25 mi) south-west of Barrie.

== Manufacturing ==
Honda of Canada Manufacturing (HCM) currently operates three plants at their 890 acres (3.6 km^{2}) site in Alliston, with on-site facilities also including a recreation centre with a full NHL-sized hockey arena, physical fitness areas, a baseball diamond, and volleyball and tennis courts. The large cavernous plants require radios between members for communication and cold water chillers for HVAC systems.

As of 2025, the three plants have more than 4,200 employees and have an annual capacity of 400,000 vehicles. Plant 1 was built in 1986. It is the first Canadian manufacturing facility by a Japanese automaker. A stamping and bumper painting line was added in 1989. Production of the Civic coupe commenced in 1993. Honda's second plant in Alliston began production in 1998, originally building Honda Odyssey vans for the 1999 model year. Production of the Odyssey in Canada stopped in 2004 to make room for the Ridgeline. Production of the Honda Pilot in Canada stopped in 2007 to allow Civic sedans to be built in Plant 2.

In May 2006, Honda announced it would build a CA$154 million engine plant in Alliston to supply about 200,000 engines a year for the Civic model. The plant opened in 2008. The plant has capacity of 190,000 four-cylinder engines.

Early 2009 saw the end of Ridgeline production at the Alliston Assembly facility. Ridgeline production has been moved to Honda's Alabama assembly line. The discontinuance of Ridgeline production would make room for more Civic production at Plant 2.

January 29, 2009 Honda announced further reductions in production at the Alliston plant. "One assembly line at the facility will go from two daily work shifts to one. Output of Civic and Acura MDX models made on the line will be halved from 800 units a day to 400 units."

In early 2012, Honda of Canada Manufacturing became Honda's first plant in North America to produce four distinct models: Civic, CR-V, MDX and ZDX from the same production line, demonstrating its flexibility and capability.

On March 28, 2013, the last Acura MDX was assembled in Alliston. Production was moved to Honda's Alabama plant. Since 2000 (2001 model year), a total of 713,158 MDXs were manufactured at HCM. Honda of Canada Manufacturing now builds Civics and CR-Vs only. In February 2020, Honda built its nine-millionth vehicle in Ontario.

In March, 2022, Honda announced it would invest CA$1.38 billion over six years in part to upgrade and retool Alliston plant to become the global lead plant for the 2023 CR-V. The federal and provincial governments agreed to each provide conditional contribution of CA$131.6 million. The investment will also cover the engine plant and Plant 1.

Production of the 2023 CR-V started in September 2022, followed by hybrid model. Honda plans to increase the hybrid model to 50 percent of CR-V sales in North America.

== Current products ==
Plant	Location	Year opened	Year closed	Notes
Alliston Plant 1	Alliston, Ontario	1986		Models: Honda Civic including Si model (1988–present)
Alliston Plant 2	Alliston, Ontario	1998		Models: Honda CR-V (2012–present)

== Former products ==
- Honda Accord (1986–1988)
- Honda Civic coupe (1993-2020)
- Honda Odyssey (1998-2004)
- Honda Pilot (2002-2008)
- Honda Ridgeline (2004-2009)
- Acura CSX (2005–2011)
- Acura EL (1996-2005)
- Acura MDX (2000-2013)
- Acura ZDX (2009-2013)
