= Acura EL =

Subcompact executive car by Acura (1997–2005)

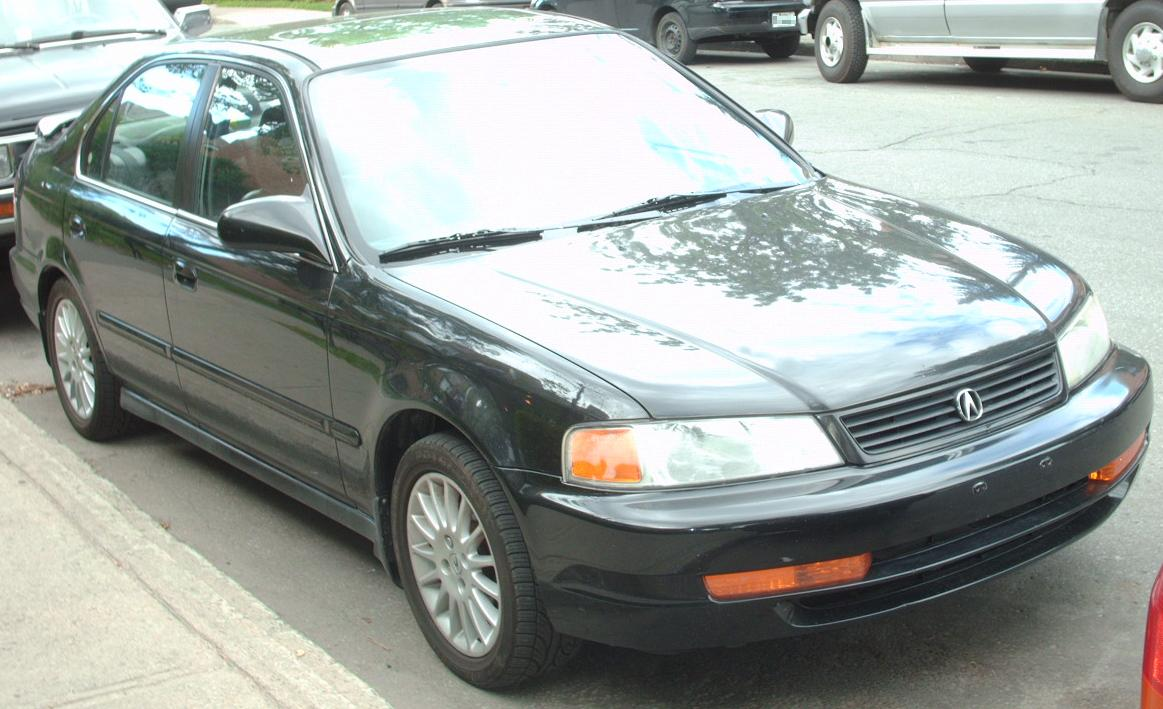
- 1997–1998 Acura 1.6EL

Overview
- Manufacturer: Honda
- Production: 1997–2005
- Assembly: Canada: Alliston, Ontario (HCM)

Body and chassis
- Class: Subcompact executive car
- Body style: 4-door sedan
- Layout: FF layout

Powertrain
- Transmission: 4-speed automatic 5-speed manual

Chronology
- Predecessor: Acura Integra (sedan, Canada only)
- Successor: Acura CSX

The Acura EL is a subcompact executive car that was built at Honda's Alliston, Ontario, plant, and also the first Acura built in Canada. It was also exclusively sold in Canada. The EL is a badge-engineered Honda Civic with a higher level of features. Acura’s Type-S trim was not offered on the EL.

The Acura EL was a sales success. Representing 51% of Acura Canada's annual new-vehicle sales in its first full year, the EL remained Acura's top seller in Canada from 1997 to 2003. The Acura EL was replaced for the 2006 model year by the Acura CSX which, like the EL, was available only in Canada.

== First generation (1997–2000) ==
1.6EL
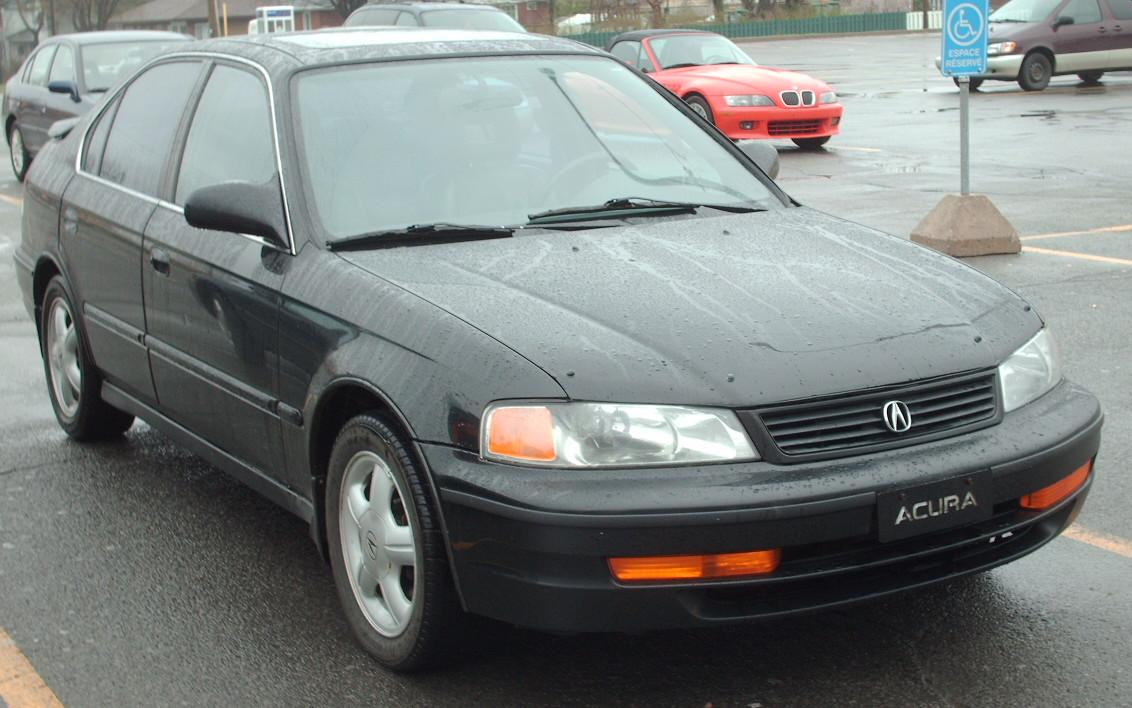
- 1997–1998 Acura 1.6EL

Overview
- Model code: MB4
- Production: 1997–2000
- Designer: Don Herner, Kouichirou Fujii

Body and chassis
- Related: Honda Domani; Honda/Acura Integra; Honda Civic; Isuzu Gemini; Rover 400

Powertrain
- Engine: D16Y8 1.6 L I4

Dimensions
- Wheelbase: 103.1 in (2,619 mm)
- Length: 176.3 in (4,478 mm)
- Width: 67.1 in (1,704 mm)
- Height: 54.9 in (1,394 mm)
- Curb weight: 2,379 lb (1,079 kg)

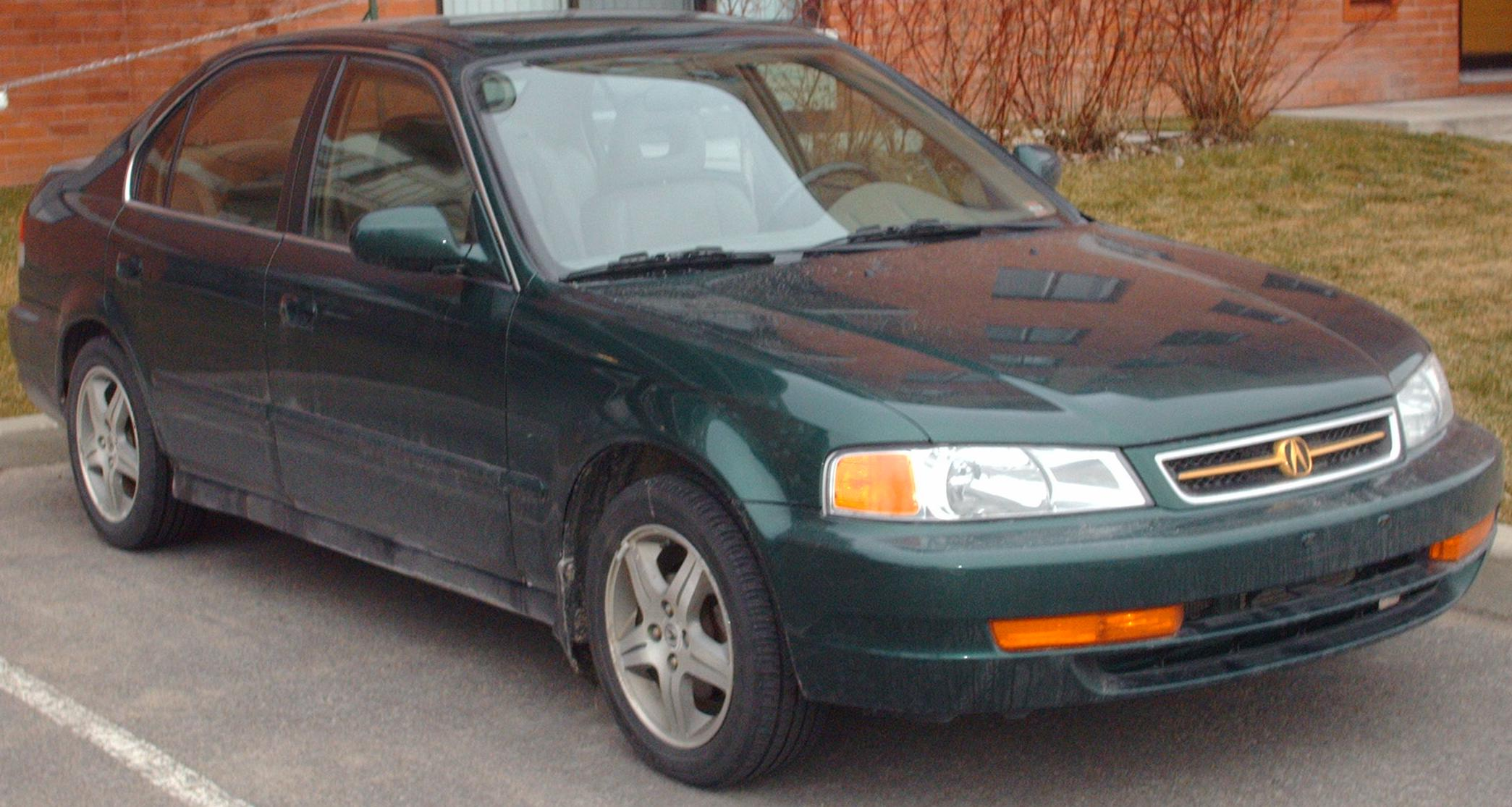
1999–2000 Acura 1.6EL

Seeing that sales within Canada for the four-door Acura Integra were extremely low, Honda decided to replace it with the four-door-only Acura EL. The first generation of the EL was a somewhat altered version of the 1997–2000 Honda Civic with the differing front end, trunk, lights and various interior pieces. Produced by Honda Canada, the EL would also be rebadged and exported to Japan as the second-generation Honda Domani.

The EL has a moonroof, CD player, and a 1.6-litre SOHC VTEC engine produces 127 hp (95 kW) at 6,600 rpm and 107 lb⋅ft (145 N⋅m) at 5,500 rpm, making it similar to the American Civic EX sedan (which was not sold in Canada) and the Canadian Civic Si Coupe (which was equivalent to the American Civic EX Coupe). The EL has additional features not available on Civics such as amber-lit LED interior dash display, tachometer, power trunk (no keyhole on the trunklid), alarm, 15-inch (195/55/15) wheels, antenna in the rear window glass, chrome interior door handles, extra pocket underneath the centre console, paint-matched mirrors, side mouldings, and door handles, slightly stiffer suspension, 12-mm rear sway bar and 26-mm front sway bar, heated mirrors, and an amplifier. From 1999, all 5-speed models had a leather-wrapped shift knob, similar to the one in the Acura Integra GS-R.

=== Model configurations ===
In addition to the above:

- Base: CD player, air conditioning
- Sport: 15-inch alloy wheels, CD player, air conditioning. From 1999: folding heated mirrors, a sunroof, and an upgraded grille on the front end.
- Premium: in addition to the Sport, leather seats, and decorative spoiler.

== Second generation (2001–2005) ==
1.7EL
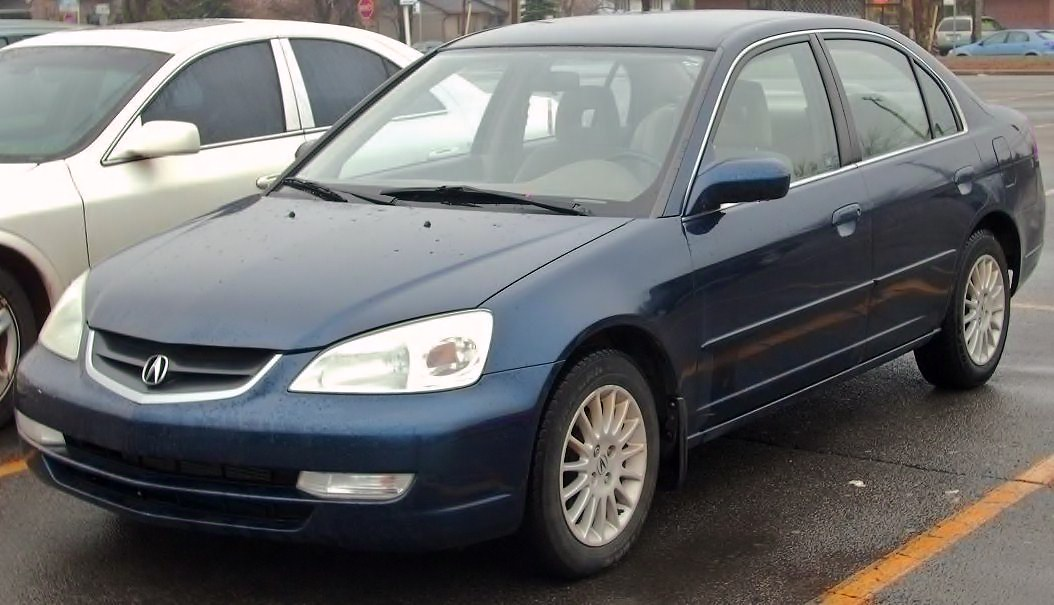
- 2001–2003 Acura 1.7EL

Overview
- Model code: ES3
- Also called: Acura EL (2004–2005)
- Production: 2001–2005

Body and chassis
- Related: Honda Element; Honda CR-V; Honda/Acura Integra; Acura RSX; Honda Civic

Powertrain
- Engine: D17A2 1.7 L SOHC I4 (127 hp)
- Transmission: 5-speed manual 4-speed automatic

Dimensions
- Wheelbase: 103.1 in (2620 mm)
- Length: 2001–2003: 176.7 in (4488 mm); 2004–2005: 177.4 in (4505 mm)
- Width: 67.5 in (1715 mm)
- Height: 56.7 in (1440 mm)

The EL was completely redesigned for the 2001 model year and was then based on the seventh-generation Civic. Besides the slightly more powerful and torquier VTEC-equipped 1.7 L 4-cylinder SOHC engine with 127 hp (95 kW), headlight and taillight designs and available leather interior trimmings set it apart from the Civic. Other differences include 15-inch multi-spoke alloys, heated power mirrors, cruise control, and rear disc brakes. The badging was changed to Acura 1.7EL and in 2004 Acura revised its naming scheme, leaving only "Acura EL" on the rear fascia.

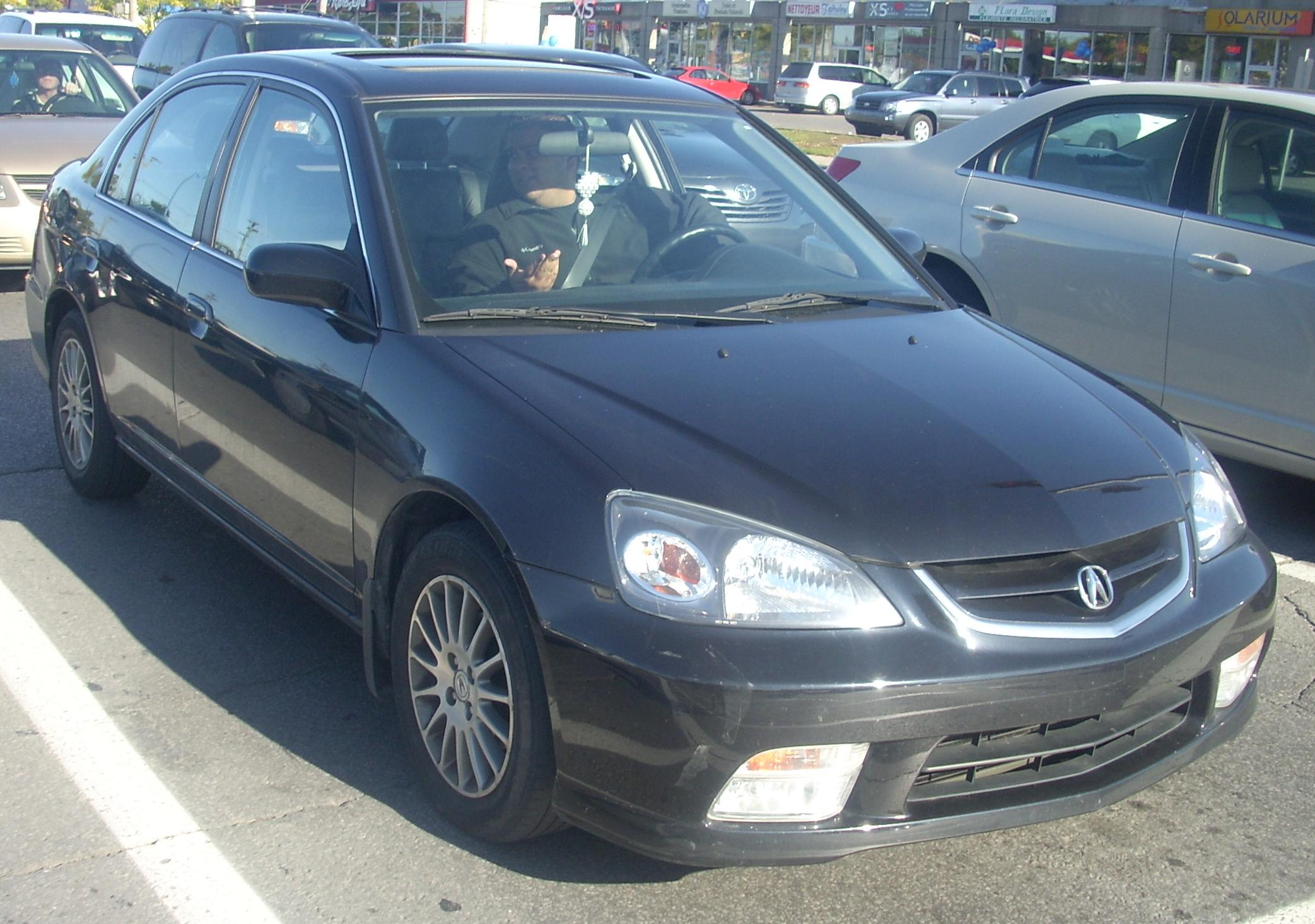
2004–2005 Acura EL

The second generation was available in touring and premium trim levels, the latter adding leather seats, heated front seats and a power sunroof. Automatic climate control was added for the premium trim in 2003 and the touring trim in 2004. All second generation EL models came with ABS anti-lock braking, but in 2003 an electronic brakeforce distribution system was made standard. For 2003 and 2004, a special dealer-installed 'aero package' was made available for both trims levels adding unique front and rear lips, side stills and a rear spoiler.

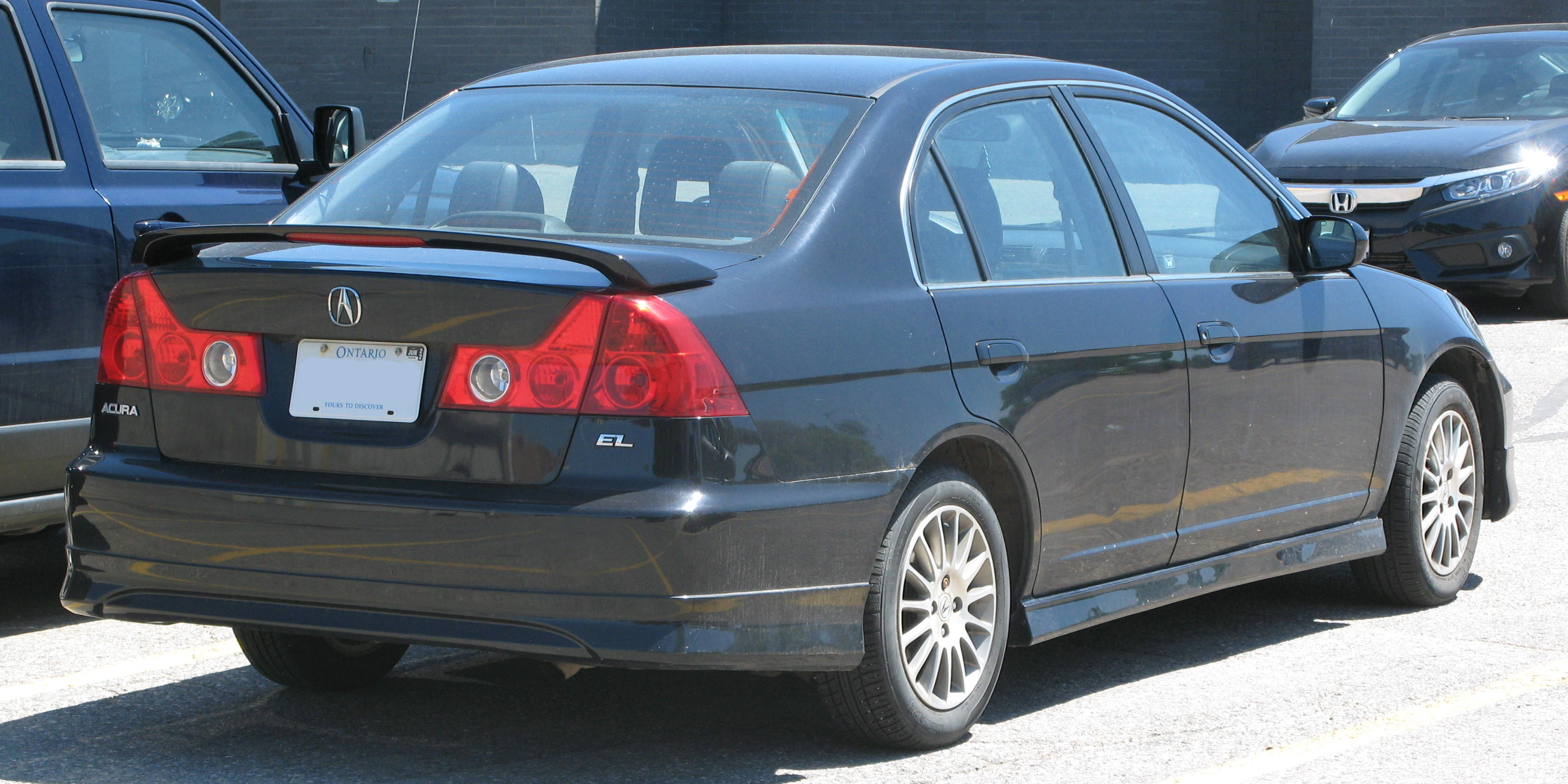
2005 Acura EL 1.7 Premium (rear view)

In 2004, the EL underwent a slight exterior makeover with restyled headlamps, front bumper and grille, taillights, trunk lid, and rear bumper. The new look came with standard fog lights, a restyled steering wheel, new woodgrain trim patterns, and two additional tweeters powered by two amplifiers to complete the 6-speaker audio system.

== Discontinuation ==
Despite being Acura Canada’s best-selling vehicle, Honda announced that it would discontinue the EL. In 2006, the CSX was confirmed to be a replacement for the EL. Like the EL, the CSX was sold only in Canada. The CSX was discontinued in 2011.

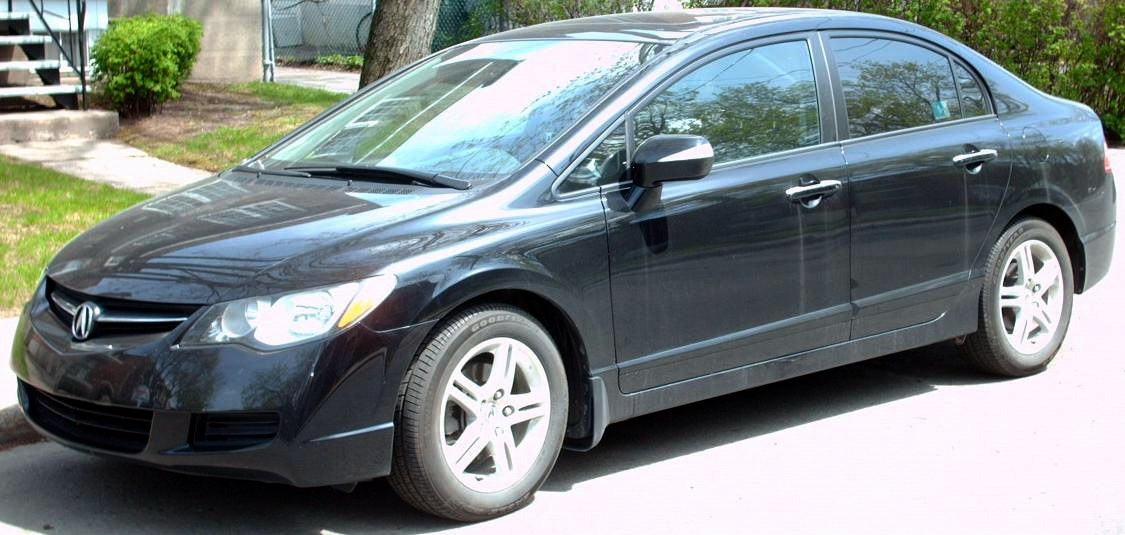
The CSX was confirmed after the car is discontinued and is sold only in Canada until 2011.
