= Acura CSX =

Subcompact executive car by Acura (2006–2011)

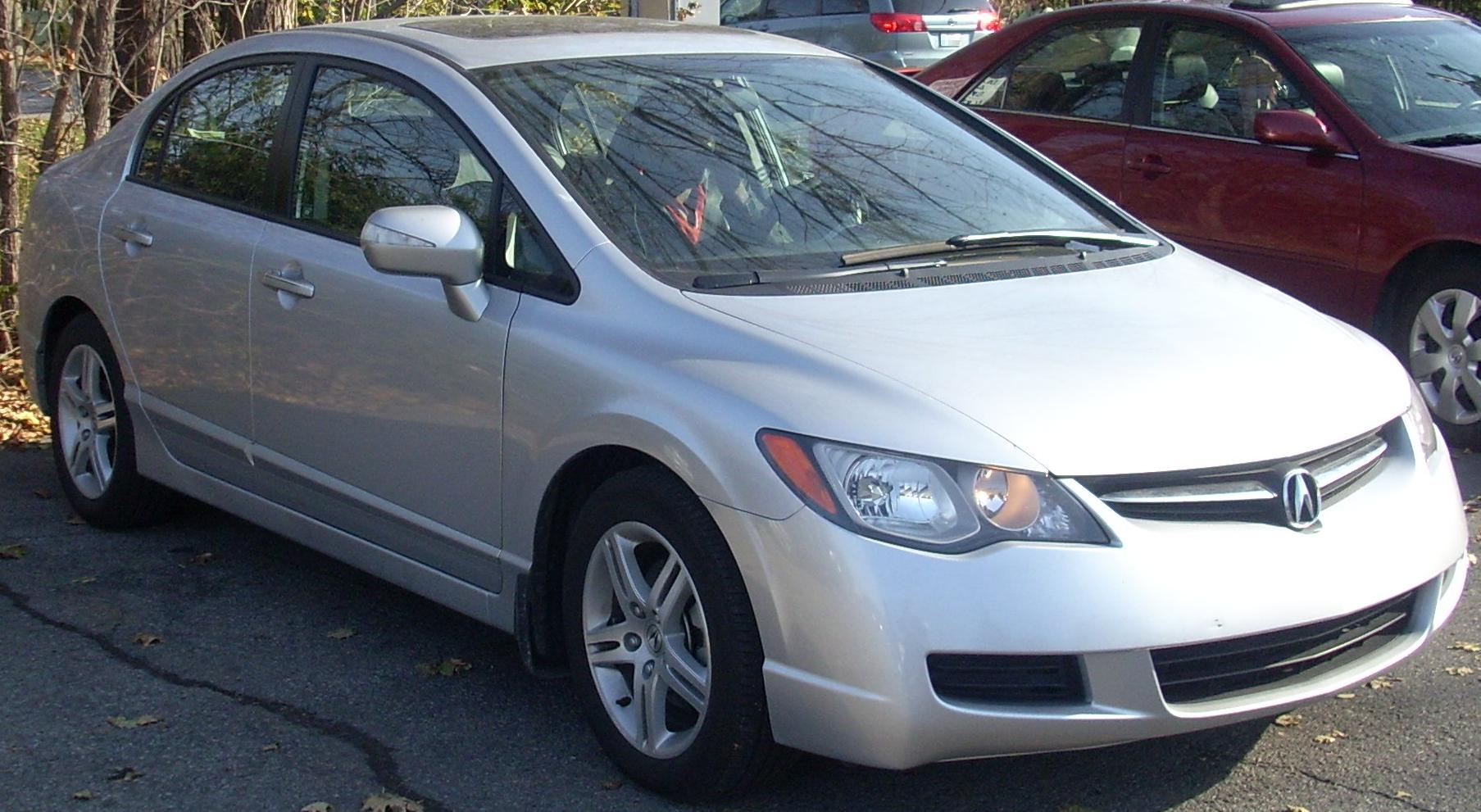
- 2007 Acura CSX

Overview
- Manufacturer: Honda
- Also called: Honda Civic (eighth generation); Ciimo 1.8
- Production: November 2005–2011
- Model years: 2006–2011
- Assembly: Canada: Alliston, Ontario (HCM)
- Designer: Motoaki Minowa and Jiro Ikeda

Body and chassis
- Class: Subcompact executive car
- Body style: 4-door sedan
- Layout: Front-engine, front-wheel-drive
- Related: Honda CR-V; Honda Element

Powertrain
- Engine: Gasoline: 2.0 L K20Z2 I4; 2.0 L K20Z3 I4 (Type-S)
- Transmission: 5-speed manual 5-speed automatic 6-speed manual (Type-S)

Dimensions
- Wheelbase: 2,700 mm (106.3 in)
- Length: 4,544 mm (178.9 in)
- Width: 1,752 mm (69.0 in)
- Height: 1,435 mm (56.5 in)
- Curb weight: 1,313 kg (2,895 lb); 1,343 kg (2,961 lb) (AT)

Chronology
- Predecessor: Acura EL
- Successor: Acura ILX

The Acura CSX is Acura's subcompact executive car exclusively designed for the Canadian market and sold from 2006–2011 model years. Like the Acura EL, it was only available in Canada and built in Alliston, Ontario, Canada. For the 2013 model year, the ILX was introduced as the CSX's replacement and is available in both the United States and Canada.

== Design ==
Honda chose the Canadian-designed CSX styling as the template for the Civic sold in the Japanese and international markets, instead of the opposite. The CSX uses the same chassis as the 2006–2011 North American market Honda Civic Sedan. Differentiating the Acura from its mainstream North American counterpart include a slightly longer nose with shaped headlamp clusters, a full-width lower air intake and a slight crease up the hood's centreline. At the rear, jewelled taillamps and the shaping of the trunk's sheet metal contrast the upscale-marketed CSX from the Civic.

The CSX shares some features with the JDM Civic, most notably the 2.0 L DOHC i-VTEC engine rated at 155 hp (116 kW) at 6,000 rpm and 139 lb⋅ft (188 N⋅m) at 4500 rpm. Also shared with the JDM Civic are the front and rear fascias; the steering wheel design is used in Japanese, European, and American-market Civic models.

== Trims ==
The CSX went on sale in November 2005 as a 2006 model. The 2006 CSX was introduced in 3 trims: Touring (the base model), Premium, and Premium + Navi. Standard features on the touring model include 16-inch alloy wheels, anti-lock brakes, side and curtain airbags, leather-wrapped steering wheel with audio controls, paddle shifters for automatic transmission models, heated door mirrors with integrated turn signals, 6-speaker audio system with CD/MP3/WMA capability, automatic climate control, cruise control, chrome door handles, and 60/40 split folding rear seats. Key additions in the Premium model included high-intensity discharge (HID) headlights, leather upholstery, heated front seats, a power moonroof, and an in-dash 6 disc CD changer. The Navi model was only available as an upgrade to the Premium trim, adding a bilingual voice-activated navigation system, illuminated steering wheel controls, and a digital audio card reader. Leather upholstery was not available for Honda Civics sold in Canada until the 2008 model year when the EX-L was made available, while the navigation system was never offered for the Canadian lineup of Civics. Lastly, the 2.0 L DOHC i-VTEC engine, HID headlamps, chrome door handles, paddle shifters, and the 6 disc CD changer remained exclusive to the CSX as they were not available for Civics in Canada nor the United States.

The resulting car is 62 kg (137 lb) to 88 kg (194 lb) heavier than the Civic EX sedan, with fuel consumption raised to 8.7 litres per 100 kilometres (32 mpg_{‑imp}; 27 mpg_{‑US}) city, 6.4 litres per 100 kilometres (44 mpg_{‑imp}; 37 mpg_{‑US}) highway for the manual model; and 9.5 litres per 100 kilometres (30 mpg_{‑imp}; 25 mpg_{‑US}) city, 6.5 litres per 100 kilometres (43 mpg_{‑imp}; 36 mpg_{‑US}) highway for the automatic model. The CSX uses regular unleaded gasoline (Min 87 AKI), while the Type S model uses premium gasoline (Min 91 AKI).

=== Type-S ===
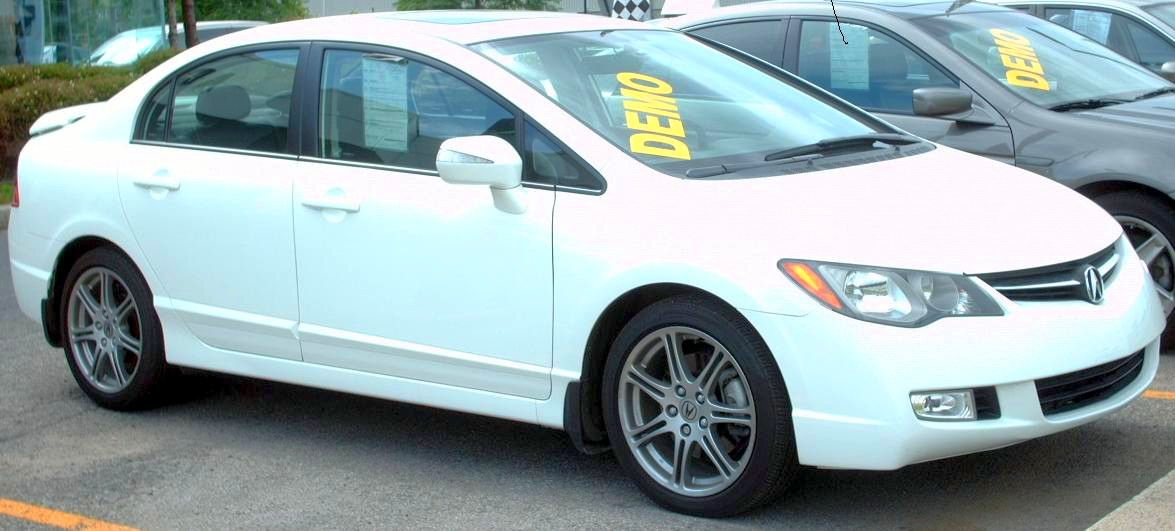
2007 Acura CSX Type-S

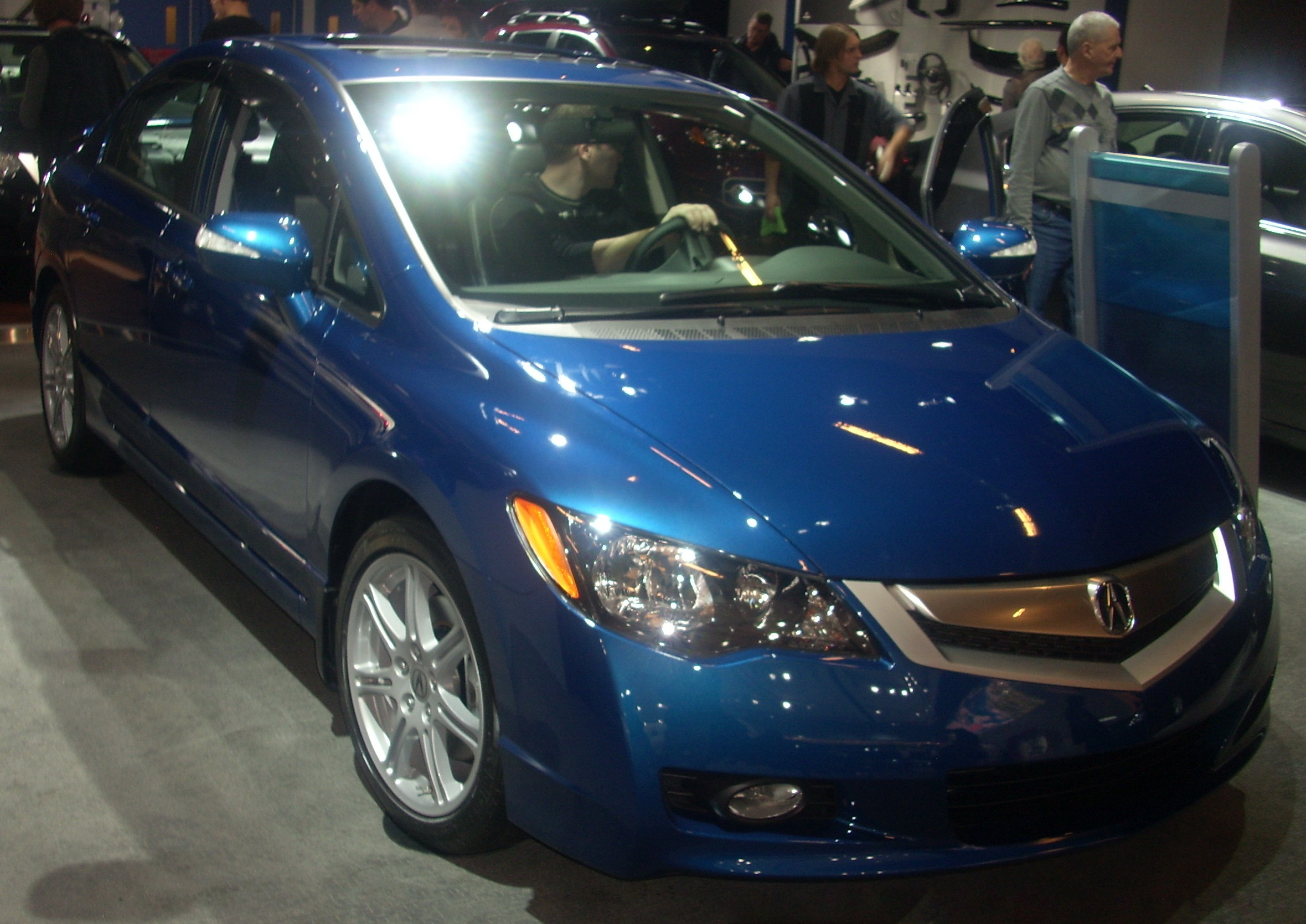
'2010 facelift Acura CSX Type-S (MIAS '10)

The Type-S variant debuted as a 2007 model and uses the identical powertrain found in the US and Canadian market 2006-2011 Honda Civic Si, consisting of a 2.0L I4, 197 horsepower (147 kW) i-VTEC engine, 6-speed manual transmission and a helical limited-slip differential. The "sport-tuned" suspension is identical to the US-only 2006+ Honda Civic Si sedan with stiffer springs, firmer damping and thicker stabilizer bars compared to the regular CSX and is supported on 215/45R17 all-season tires and 17-inch alloy wheels. Unlike the Canadian market Civic Si coupe, the CSX Type-S employs Honda's version of electronic stability control (Vehicle Stability Assist, or VSA). Other amenities include 17-inch aluminum-alloy wheels, rear wing spoiler with integrated LED brake light, fog lights, bilingual navigation system, a 350-watt 7-speaker audio system, digital audio card reader, Type-S badging and illuminated foot wells.

Fuel consumption is 10.2 L/100 km (28 mpg_{‑imp}; 23 mpg_{‑US}) city, 6.8 L/100 km (42 mpg_{‑imp}; 35 mpg_{‑US}) highway with a minimum of 91 octane AKI fuel required.

The 2007 CSX Type-S went on sale on November 6, 2006.

For the 2008 model year, the Honda Civic Si was offered as a sedan as well as a coupe, however, the Acura CSX Type-S remained available since it has features not found in its Honda counterpart such as the navigation system and leather upholstery.

For the 2009 model year, Acura made slight modifications to the CSX's front-end. Inside, the Type-S came with new USB and Bluetooth connections. The Type-S did not have any major modifications for 2010 and was discontinued in 2011.

== Trim and mid-model changes ==
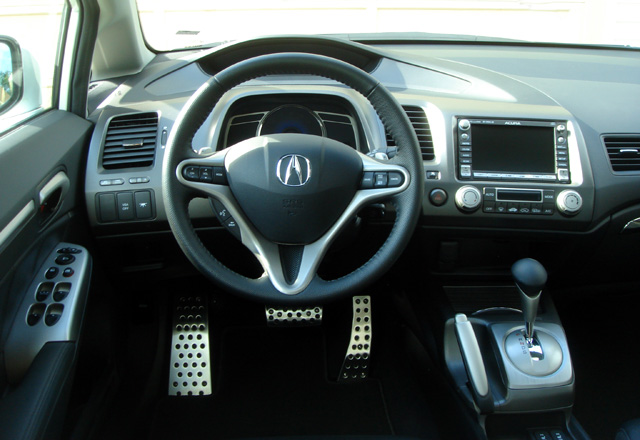
Interior of a 2008 CSX

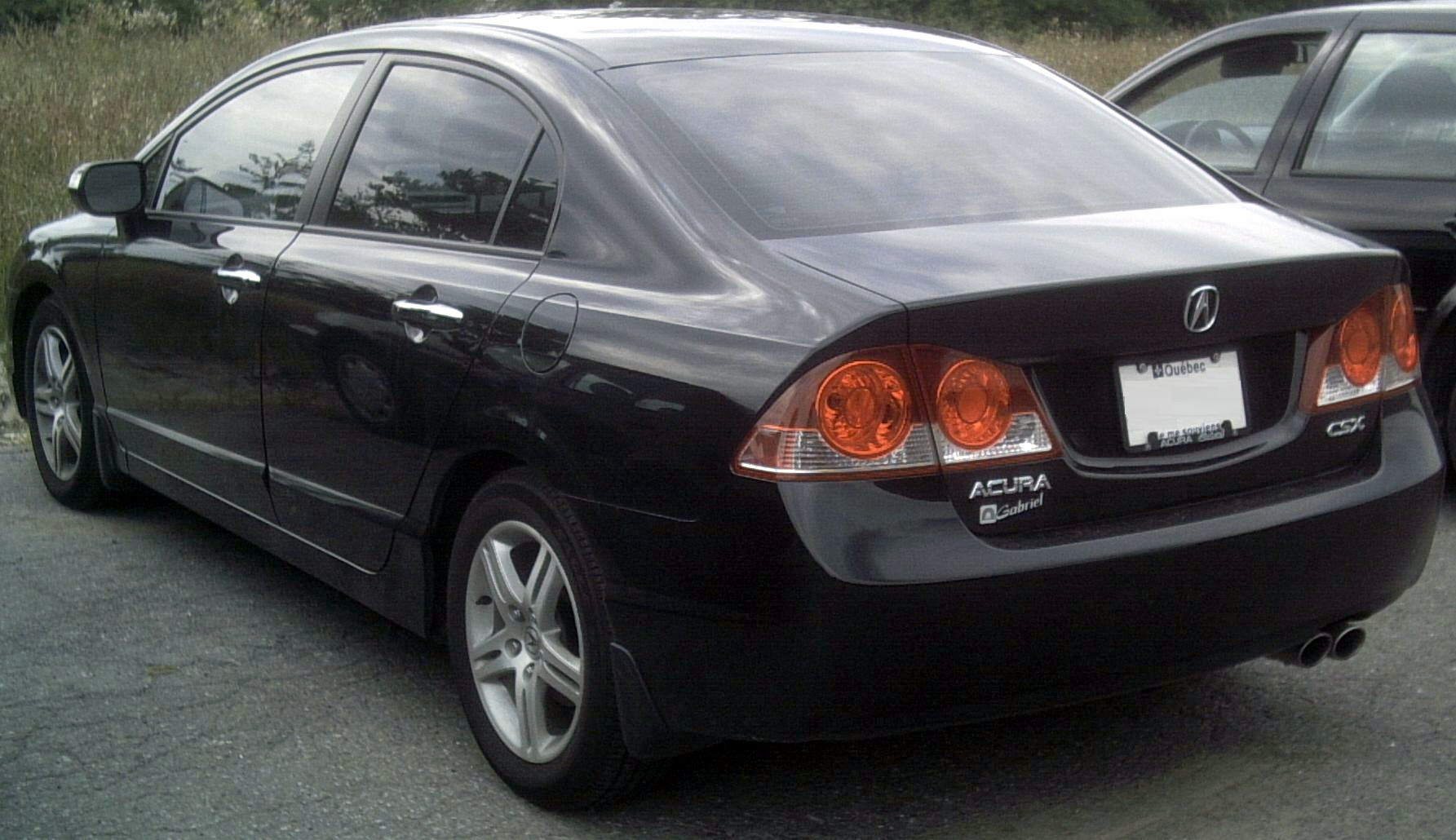
Acura CSX

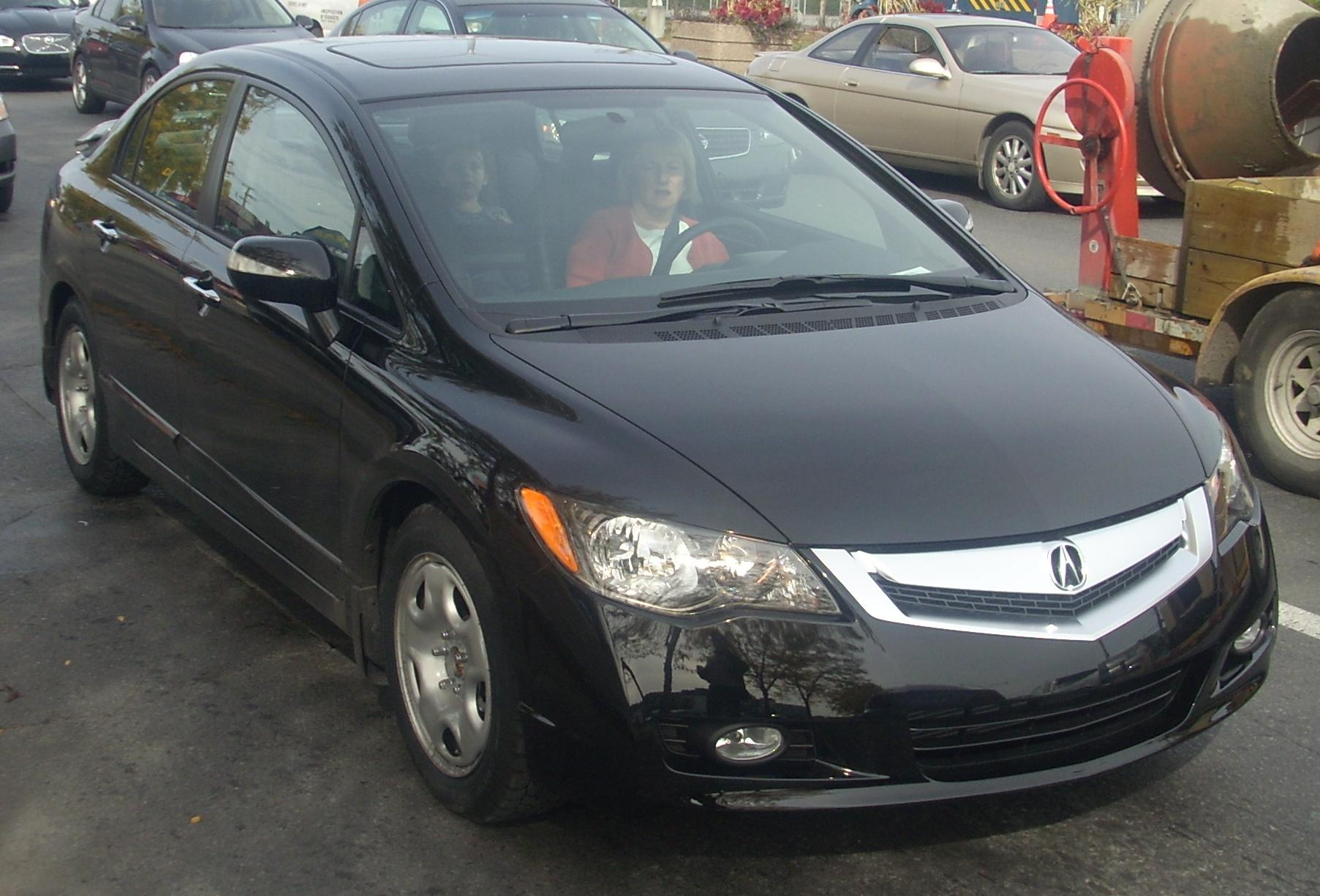
2009–2011 facelift Acura CSX

For 2007 models, an auxiliary input jack for the audio system was added for all CSX models.

For 2008 models, leather upholstery, a tire pressure monitoring system, illuminated vanity mirrors, and vehicle stability assist (VSA) were made standard equipment on all CSX models. The decision to phase out the base CSX with cloth seats was due to the Honda Civic EX-L trim being available for the 2008 model year onwards. The CSX Premium was renamed CSX Technology, which added high-intensity discharge headlights, fog lamps, XM Satellite Radio with roof-mounted antenna, premium stereo and bilingual voice-activated navigation system.

Like the Honda Civic, the CSX received a mid-model change in 2009, most notably giving it Acura's trademark Power Plenum grille. Other exterior changes include black-housing headlights, octagonal tail-lamps, and revised front bumper and fog lights. While not new to the line-up, the 17-inch alloy wheels previously exclusive to the Type S became standard on all models. New features for 2009 include USB audio connectivity for all models, and Bluetooth hands-free wireless link for Technology and Type-S models. For 2010, the base model was discontinued and the entry level Technology model was renamed to "iTech".

For 2011, the car's final model year, Acura simplified the CSX line, offering two trim levels, Base and iTech, both have significantly reduced MSRP from the previous 2010 models. The Type-S trim was discontinued for 2011. Only four colours were available: Crystal Black Pearl, Alabaster Silver Metallic, Polished Metal Metallic, and Taffeta White.

== Discontinuation ==
Despite being the best-selling vehicle in Acura Canada's lineup from 2006–07 and late 2009/early 2010, Honda announced the discontinuation of the Acura CSX after the 2011 model year. The Civic-based ILX was confirmed as the car's successor for the 2013 model year. As such, the Acura CSX became the third Acura to have only sold one model generation, after the Vigor (1992–94) and the U.S.-exclusive SLX (1996–99). (The Acura ZDX nameplate was initially only used for one generation from the 2010 to 2013 model years; however, the nameplate got revived in 2024 to be used for an electric vehicle made as part of Honda's collaboration with General Motors for EVs). (The Acura RSX nameplate was initially only used for one generation from the 2002 to 2006 model years; however, the nameplate was revived for 2026 to be used for an electric vehicle.)

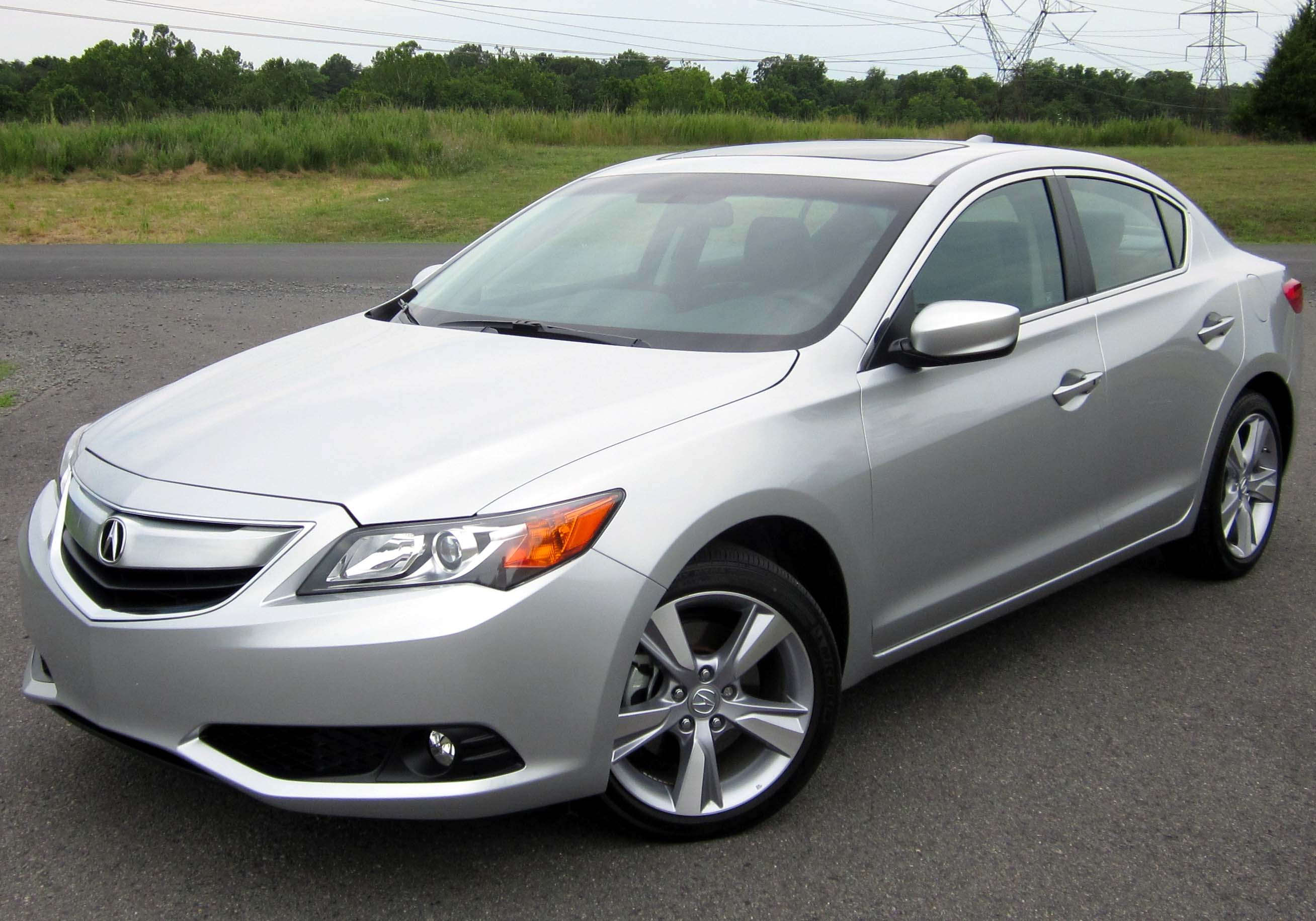
The Civic-based ILX was confirmed after the car is discontinued.
