= Quintet (disambiguation) =

A quintet is a group or formation of five members, particularly musicians

Quintet or The Quintet may also refer to:

- Quintet (company), a Japanese video game developer
- Honda Quintet, a Honda Civic derived 5-door hatchback
- Quintet (film), a 1979 film directed by Robert Altman
- Quintet (grappling), a 5 on 5 tag team Japanese grappling promotion
- Quintet (TV series), a Canadian music variety television series which aired on CBC Television in 1962
- Quintet (Prokofiev), chamber music by Sergei Prokofiev
- The Quintet, group that recorded the album Jazz at Massey Hall
- The Quintet (album), a 1977 album by V.S.O.P.
- Quintet Private Bank, a Luxembourg-headquartered bank

== See also ==
- Quintette (disambiguation)
