= Honda Civic (third generation) =

Third generation of Honda Civic

Honda Civic Third generation
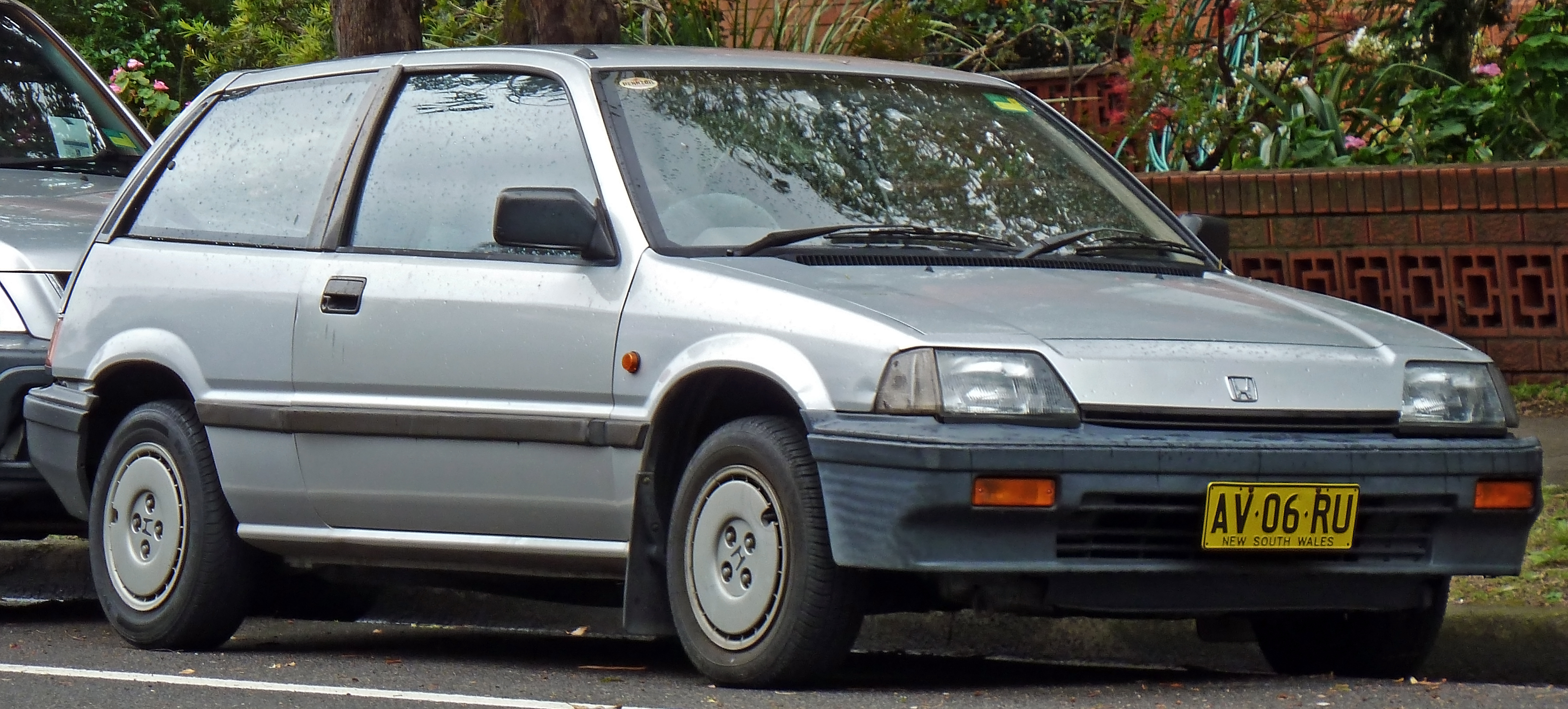

Overview
- Manufacturer: Honda
- Model code: AG; AH; AJ; AK; AT; AU
- Production: September 1983 – September 1987
- Model years: 1984–1987
- Assembly: Suzuka, Japan; North Jakarta, Indonesia (PT. Prospect Motor); Johor Bahru, Malaysia (OASB); Nelson, New Zealand (Honda NZ); East London, South Africa (Mercedes-Benz South Africa); Hsinchu, Taiwan, ROC; Bangkok, Thailand (BGAC)
- Designer: Yoshio Ui, Tsuyoshi Nishimura, Osamu Akimoto (1981)

Body and chassis
- Class: Subcompact car
- Body style: 3-door hatchback/kammback (AG-AH/AT); 3-door coupé (AE-AF; CRX); 4-door sedan (AJ-AK/AU); 5-door station wagon (AJ-AK/AR; Shuttle)
- Layout: Front-engine, front-wheel-drive / four-wheel-drive
- Related: Rover 200; Honda CR-X; Honda Ballade; Honda Quint; Honda/Acura Integra

Powertrain
- Engine: 1187 cc ZA1/2 I4; 1342 cc EV/EV1 I4; 1488 cc EW1/2 I4; 1488 cc EW3/4 I4; 1488 cc EW5 I4; 1590 cc ZC I4
- Transmission: 4/5-speed manual 5+1 speed manual 4WD; 3-speed Hondamatic semi-automatic 4-speed Hondamatic semi-automatic

Dimensions
- Wheelbase: 93.7 in (2,380 mm) (hatchback); 96.5 in (2,451 mm) (sedan)
- Length: 150 in (3,810 mm) (hatchback); 164 in (4,166 mm) (sedan)
- Width: 64 in (1,626 mm)
- Height: 53 in (1,346 mm) (hatchback); 55 in (1,397 mm) (sedan)

Chronology
- Predecessor: Honda Civic (second generation); Honda L700 (for Shuttle)
- Successor: Honda Civic (fourth generation)

The third-generation Honda Civic is an automobile which was produced by Honda from 1983 until 1987. It was introduced in September 1983 for the 1984 model year. The Civic's wheelbase was increased by 2–5 inches (5.1–12.7 cm) to 93.7 inches (238 cm) for the hatchback or 96.5 inches (245 cm) for the sedan. A three-door hatchback/kammback, four-door sedan (also known as the Honda Ballade), the five-door "Shuttle" station wagon, and sporting CR-X coupé shared common underpinnings. This included MacPherson strut suspension with torsion bars in the front and a rear beam with coil springs. However, the body panels were largely different between models. The Civic-based Honda Quint five-door hatchback also underwent a model change, and became the Honda Quint Integra, available as both a three- and five-door fastback. The Quint Integra (soon just "Integra") was sold at the Japanese Honda Verno dealership along with the CR-X. The Civic in Japan was now exclusive to Honda Primo, along with Honda's kei cars as well as superminis like the Honda City.

At its introduction in 1983, it won the Car of the Year Japan Award.

== History ==
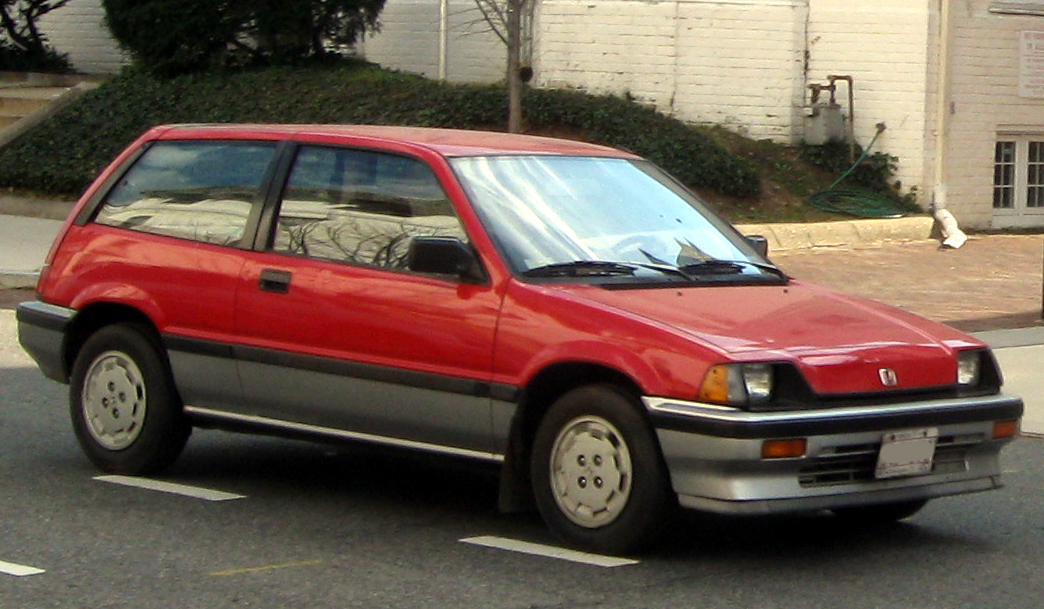
Hatchback (pre-facelift)

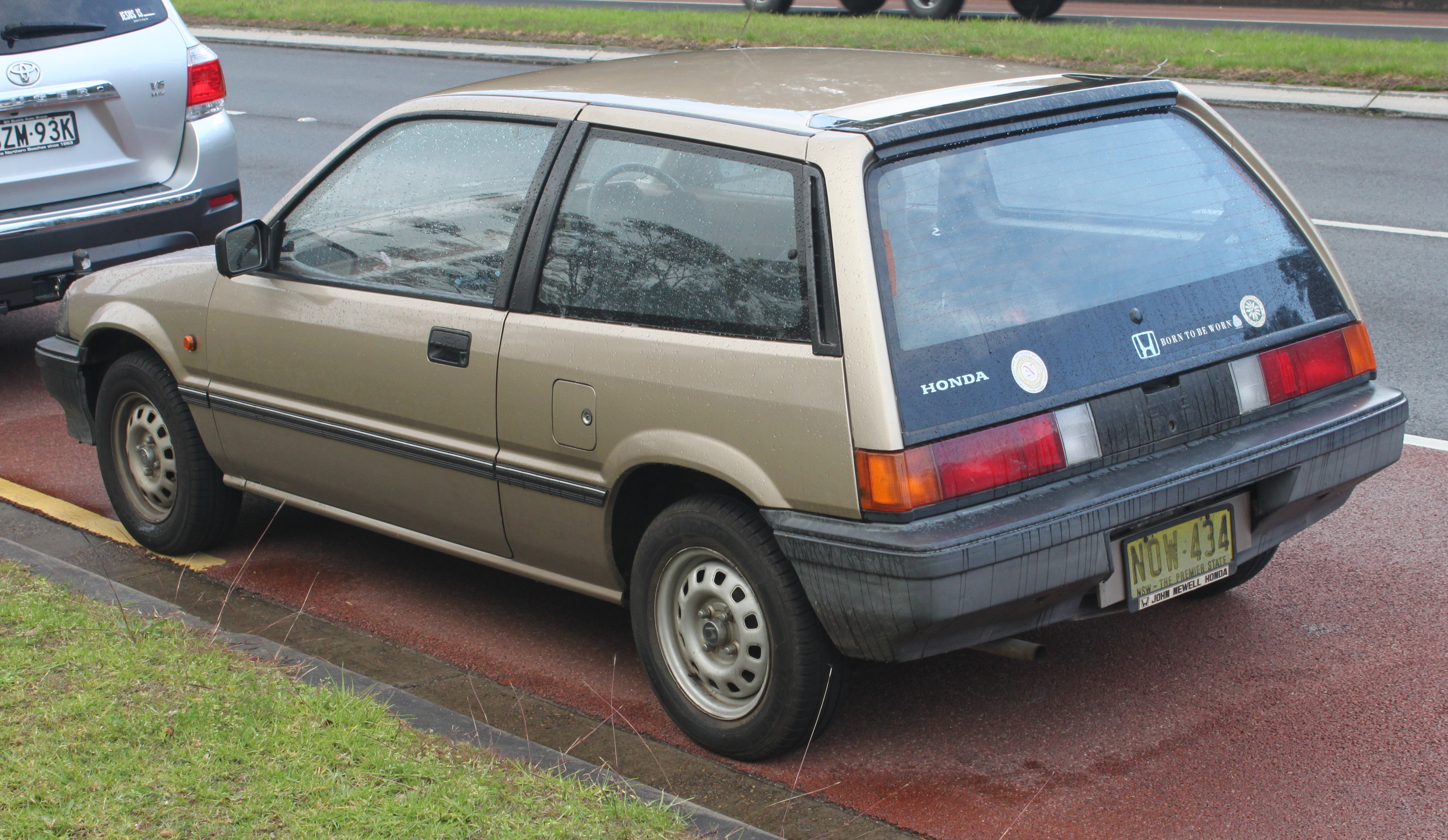
Hatchback (pre-facelift)

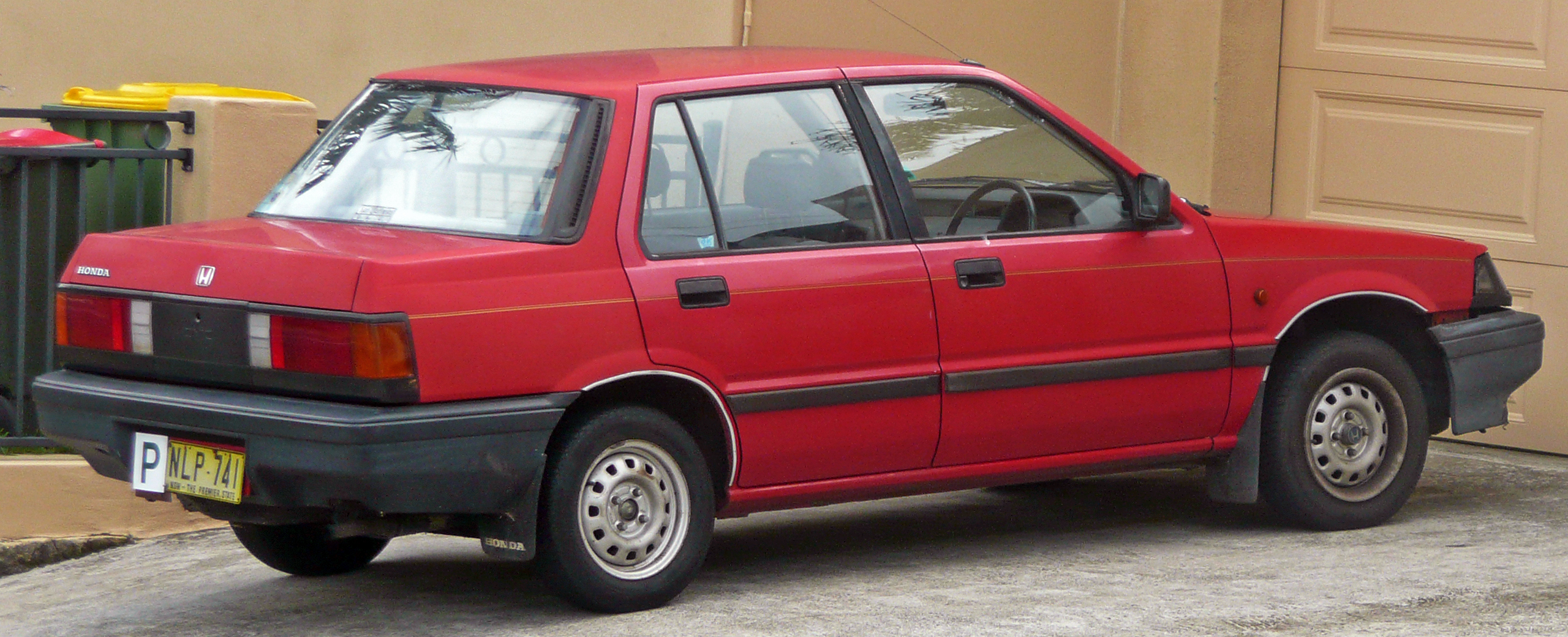
Sedan (pre-facelift)

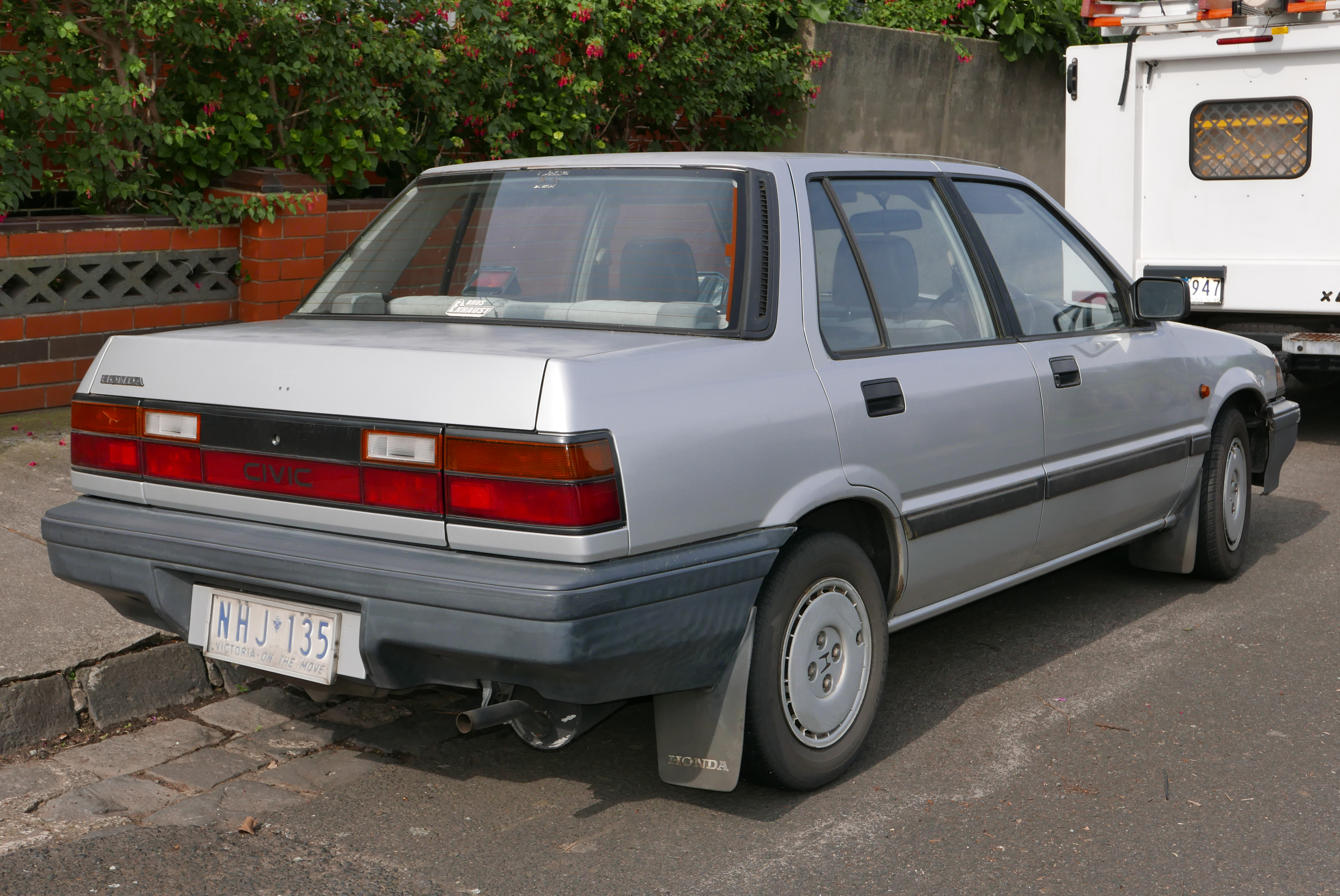
Sedan (facelift)

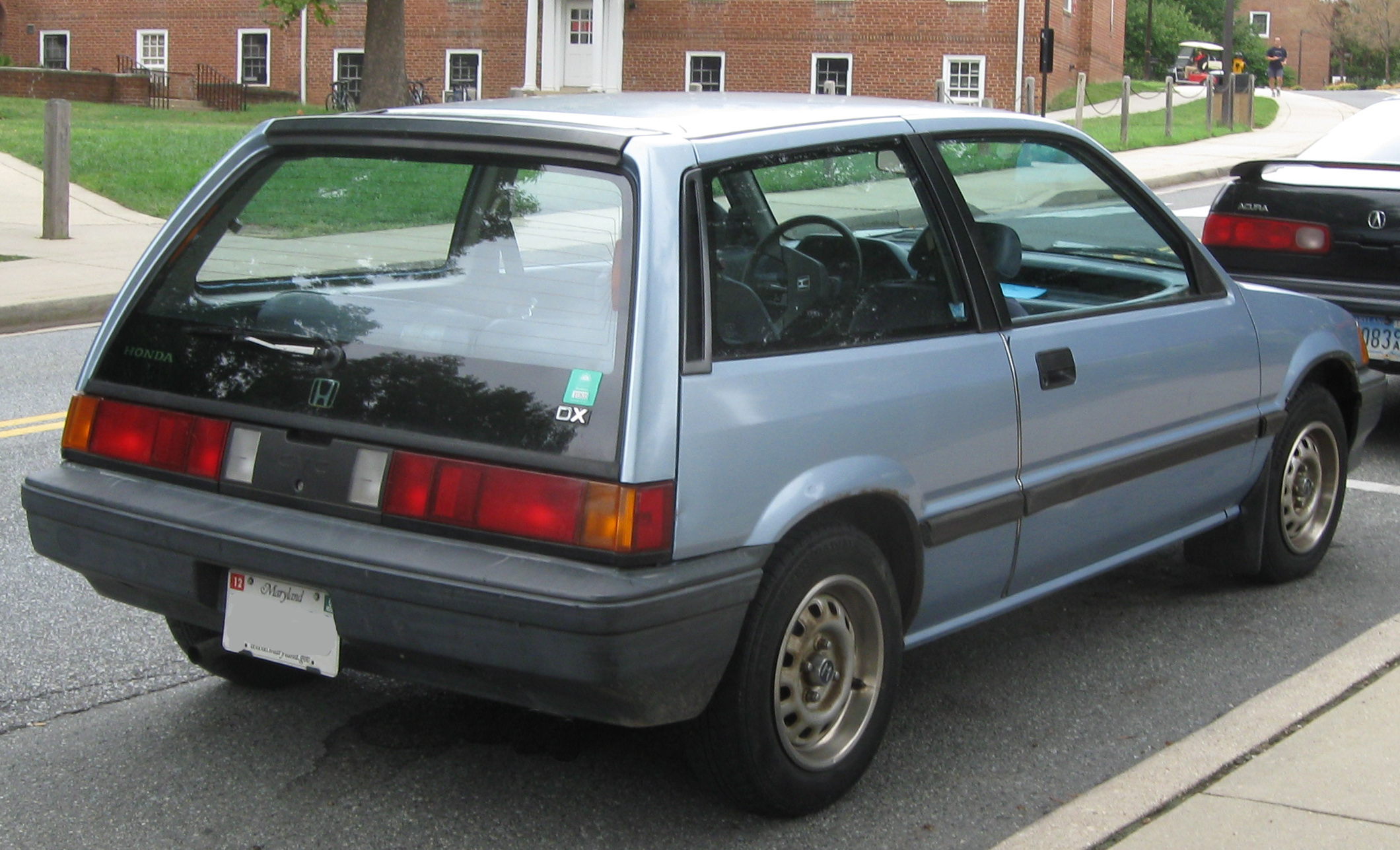
Hatchback (facelift)

The sedan and hatchback shared the same dashboard, but the CRX and wagons both had their own unique dash (CRX having a covered cubby in the middle of the dash, the wagon having a pop up set of vents which could be used or retracted into the dash). The hatchback adopted a flatter roof over the rear seats, drawing influences from a bodystyle known in Europe as a shooting-brake, that seemed to blur the definition between traditionally defined hatchbacks and the shooting brake. The flat roof, three-door hatchback appearance was also used on the supermini Honda City, and the Honda Today, the car that returned Honda to kei car production. This appearance was also used on the Honda Accord Aerodeck. The Honda CR-X was the only three-door hatchback that adopted a fastback, sloping rear hatch, demonstrating a performance car appearance identified with Honda Verno products during the mid-1980s. In Europe, a British-built version of the sedan model was also sold, as the Rover 213/216, while in Japan it was marketed in parallel (through "Verno" dealers) as the Honda Ballade. Both the Sedan and Hatchback models were also sold in Indonesia under the name Civic "Wonder".

A new 12-valve (three valves per cylinder) 76 hp, 1,500 cc inline-four engine was introduced. The base hatchback and CRX 1.3 used the 1,300 cc 8-valve engine giving 60 hp (45 kW). The DX and 1500 S model hatchbacks shared the new 1,500 cc engine with the sedan, wagon, and CRX 1.5. The 1500S model achieved over 50 mpg_{‑US} (4.7 L/100 km; 60 mpg_{‑imp}) highway.

European cars received a short-stroke 1,200 cc engine at the bottom of the ladder, with 55 PS (40 kW) at 6,000 rpm. A version of this with 62 PS (46 kW) was also available; it needs fuel with a higher octane rating. The little 1.2 was usually only available with hatchback bodywork, although some markets received a four-door version. The 71 PS (52 kW) 1300 was also available with sedan bodywork and in a range of equipment levels. The Shuttle was only available with the 85 PS (63 kW) "1500", which also appeared in the 'S' hatchback, while the CR-X received a fuel injected version of this engine producing 100 PS (74 kW). All of these engines have three valves per cylinder. The three-box sedan was not intended for sale in the European common market, initially only being available in EFTA markets such as Sweden and Switzerland.

In 1986, the Civic got flush-mounted headlights, revised tail lights, new wheel cover designs and other minor cosmetic updates. The optional three-speed automatic transmission also gained O/D (overdrive) making it a four-speed automatic.

== Sporting versions ==
Honda first adopted the Si badge for the Japanese domestic market (JDM) third-generation Civic in November 1984. Mainly offered in hatchback form, the main aesthetic difference for the Si was a slight bulge in the hood, which accommodated the taller DOHC engine. A four-door sedan variant also existed in Japan, but was only produced in small numbers and is rare. Designated as ZC1 in Japan and D16A1 in Europe, the new engine put out 120 PS (88 kW; 118 hp), enabling the car to reach a top speed of 122 mph (196 km/h) and go from 0 to 60 mph in 8.9 seconds. This was fairly powerful at the time, on par with its hot hatch competitors.

In Europe and in the United States, a somewhat sporting Civic "S" trim was introduced to the hatchback in the 1983 model year. The European version receives a carburetted version of the 12-valve 1.5-liter engine, producing 85 PS (63 kW). In the US, the Civic S featured sports seats and reclining rear seats. Although the S retained the rear beam with coil springs for the suspension, a rear stabilizer bar was added to improve handling. Unlike the JDM Civic Si, the S trim used the same carbureted 1.5 L EW1 engine as the base and the DX trims. 1985 finally saw the US release of the Si trim with the Civic CRX Si, which featured a fuel-injected, 1.5 -liter SOHC EW3 4-cylinder engine making 91 hp (68 kW).

1987 Honda Civic Si

In 1986, the Si trim was extended to the Civic hatchback, offering the same powertrain of the CRX Si but with four-seats. Added improvements for the Civic Si hatchback included a removable glass sunroof, a five-speed manual gearbox, tilt steering wheel, a full-width taillight panel, a color-keyed front airdam, sedan-style disk wheel covers, and a roof spoiler. Like the CRX Si, the Si hatchback was powered by a 91 hp (68 kW), 12-valve SOHC 4-cylinder engine designated EW4/D15A4 (the latter code was used for the 1987 model year but with the same specs). The Civic Si also saw a release in New Zealand and Australia in 1987, sharing specifications similar to those of the American-market Si.

In Europe, the fuel injected 100 PS (74 kW) already used in the CRX was installed in the Civic hatchback as well, beginning in 1985. It was called the 1.5i GT rather than Si, as the Si name was held in reserve for the later, more powerful 1.6 liter version.

== CR-X ==
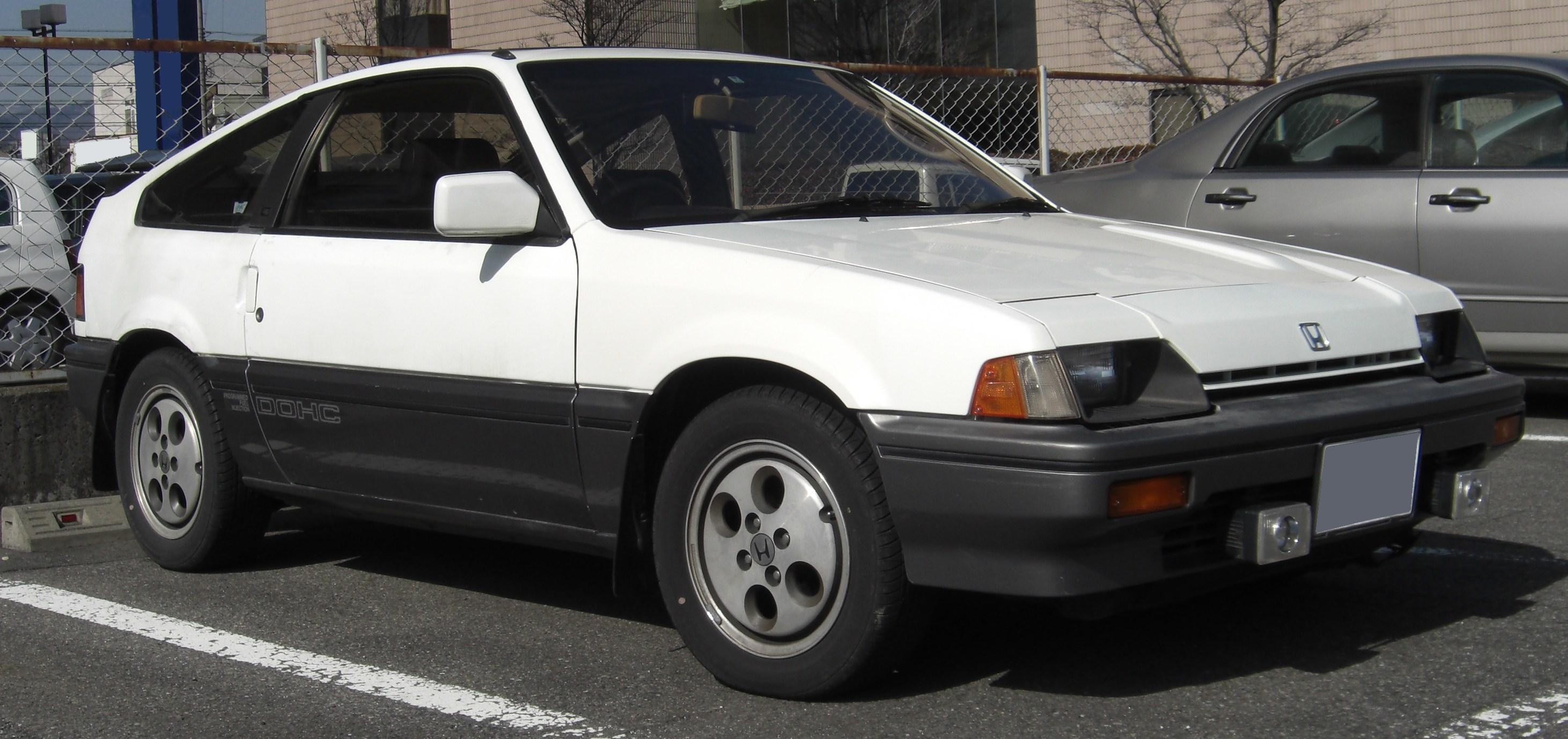
1985 Honda CRX

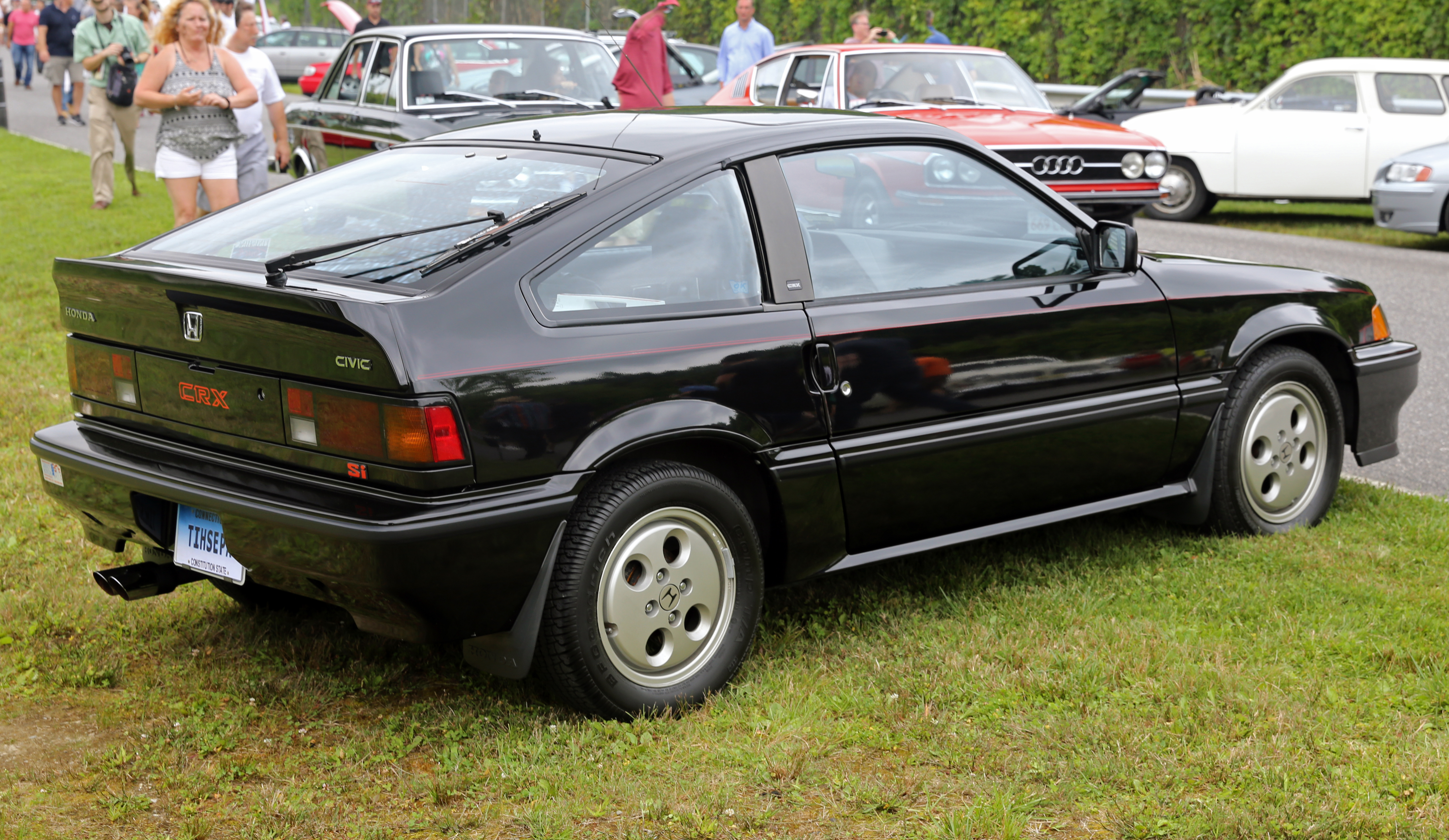
1987 Honda CRX

The CR-X was a Civic with a different body; it was a 2-seater in North America with a lockable storage compartment, while it was offered to the rest of the world with a 2+2 seating arrangement with a folding rear seat. The Si model was added to the CRX lineup in 1985, which used Honda's PGM-FI fuel injection on the 1,488 cc four-cylinder; in the United States this generated 91 hp (68 kW) while other markets received a considerably more powerful DOHC, 1.6-liter unit. The Si model added a pantograph rear wiper, sports seats, and a power sunroof. The CRX Si was also identifiable by body-colored lower body panels in 1986, new four hole "dial" alloy wheels and a body-colored rubber spoiler, now mounted on the back of the hatch as opposed to on the top portion of the lid.

Originally all CR-Xs had two-tone paint scheme with silver lower body panels. The 13-inch alloy wheels were fitted with 175/70R13 Michelin MXL tires. The comparatively quicker inline-four engine propelled the CRX Si from 0 to 60 mph in under 9 seconds.

== Shuttle/Wagon ==
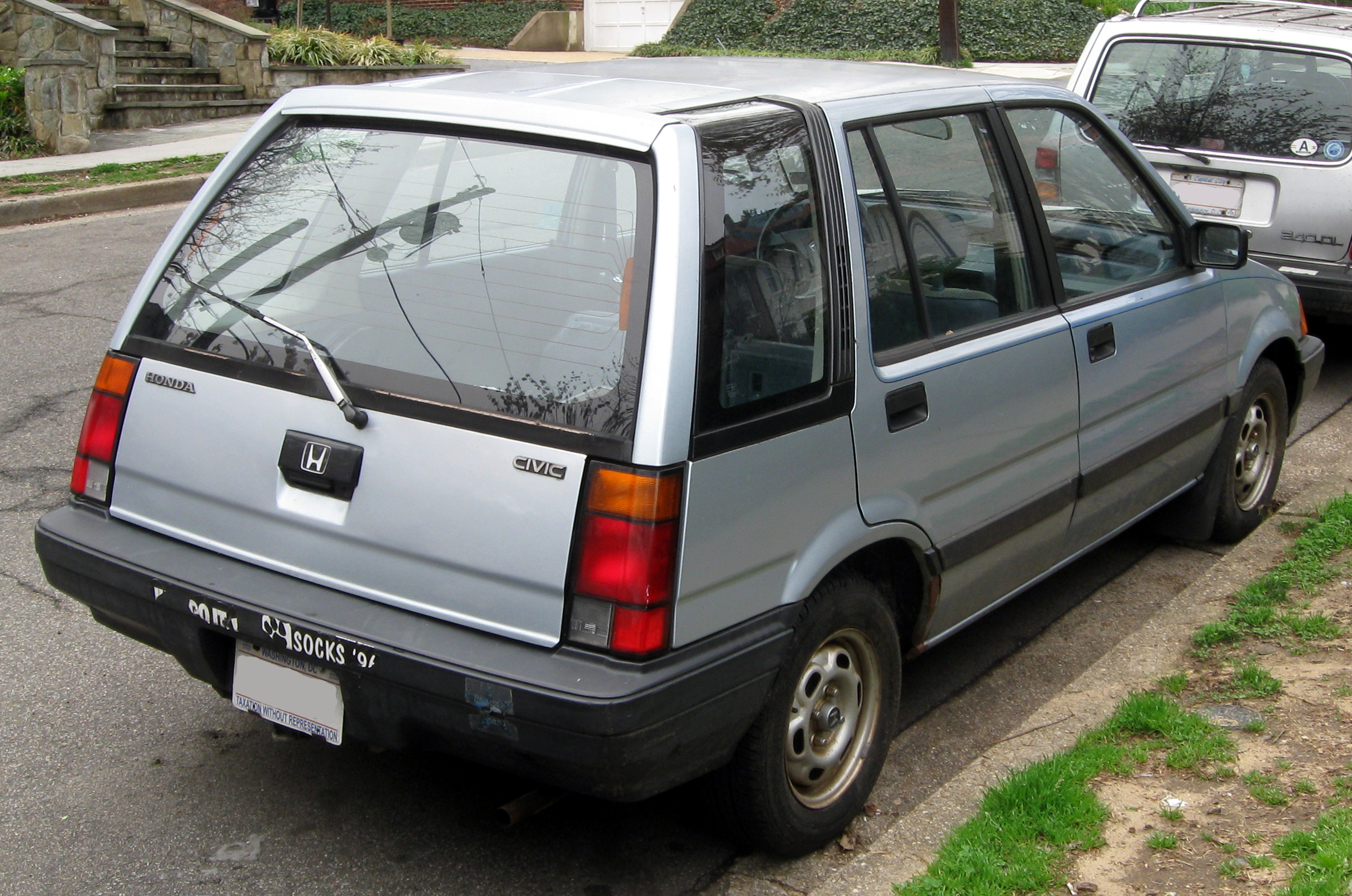
Honda Civic Wagovan (US)

The five-door wagon received unique bodywork and interior. "Shuttle" in most countries, it was called the wagon and "Wagovan" in the United States; the differences being the wagon having 50/50 split folding cloth fixed rear seats that reclined to four different positions, and the Wagovan having a vinyl single piece rear seat that slid forward to accommodate additional cargo as well as metal bars across the rear side windows. It was also available as a "full" van, called "Pro", for commercial users in the Japanese domestic market. The Shuttle's appearance as a "tall wagon" was similar to that of the concept car Lancia Megagamma introduced earlier.

The wagon was originally only available in front-wheel drive; in 1985 a part-time any-speed four-wheel drive, operated by a push button on the dash, became available. The four-wheel drive transmission also introduced a low-speed "granny gear" which could only be engaged in four-wheel drive. Externally, not much was changed aside from "4WD" stickers: the rear bumper was somewhat larger and mudflaps were standard, while the ground clearance was increased to 177 mm (7.0 in), up from 165 mm (6.5 in). The central tunnel for the driveshaft was unusually low and only minimally affected interior space. Undercarriage shielding was added for both the engine/transmission and gas tank, while the spare tire hung under the rear cargo area in a roll cage. In Europe, the 85 PS (63 kW) 1.5 liter 12-valve 'four' from the regular Shuttle was fitted.

For 1987, the push-button four-wheel drive system on the wagon was changed; a new Real-Time 4WD system featured an automatic viscous coupling unit that shifted power to the rear wheels automatically when needed. The coupling featured 67 individual friction plates, surrounded by a heat sensitive silicone oil, which would distribute power to the rear driveshaft when a difference in both front/rear wheels was present. Real-Time 4WD models are recognizable by the charcoal grey center covers, covering the lug nuts which were exposed on FWD models.
