= Honda Civic (second generation) =

Second generation of Honda Civic

Honda Civic Second generation
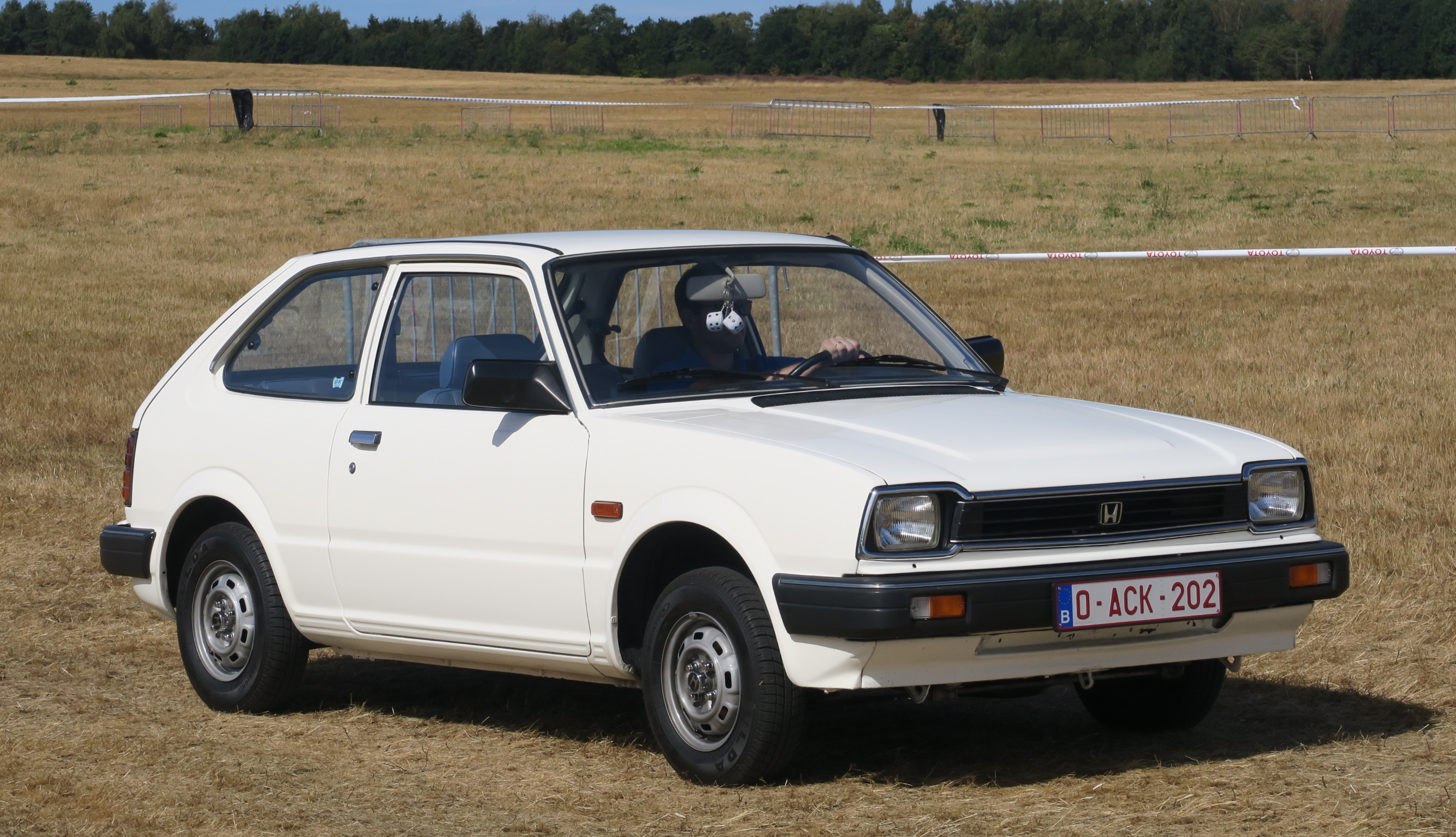
- Honda Civic 3-door hatchback (facelift)

Overview
- Manufacturer: Honda
- Model code: SL/SS/SR/ST/VC/WD
- Also called: Honda Ballade/Triumph Acclaim (sedan)
- Production: October 1979–September 1983
- Model years: 1980–1983
- Assembly: Suzuka, Japan; East London, South Africa; Nelson, New Zealand (Honda New Zealand); North Jakarta, Indonesia (PT. Prospect Motor); Johor Bahru, Malaysia (OASB); Hsinchu, Taiwan (Sanyang Honda)

Body and chassis
- Class: Subcompact car
- Body style: 3/5-door hatchback (SL/SR); 4-door sedan (SS); 5-door station wagon (ST)
- Layout: Front-engine, front-wheel-drive
- Related: Honda Quint; Honda Ballade; Triumph Acclaim

Powertrain
- Engine: 1335 cc EN1/EN4 I4 (Note: EN1 = base model, EN4 = "S" model.); 1335 cc EJ CVCC I4; 1488 cc EM CVCC I4
- Transmission: 4/5-speed manual; 2-speed Hondamatic (1979–1980); 3-speed automatic

Dimensions
- Wheelbase: 2,250 mm (88.6 in) (3-door); 2,320 mm (91.3 in)
- Length: 3-door: 3,760–3,870 mm (148.0–152.4 in); 4-door: 4,090 mm (161.0 in); 5-door: 3,830 mm (150.8 in); Wagon: 4,085 mm (160.8 in)
- Width: 1,580 mm (62.2 in)
- Height: 1,350 mm (53.1 in); Wagon: 1,380 mm (54.3 in)
- Curb weight: 3-door: 720–785 kg (1,587–1,731 lb); 4-door: 780–835 kg (1,720–1,841 lb); 5-door: 750–830 kg (1,653–1,830 lb); Wagon: 765–845 kg (1,687–1,863 lb)

Chronology
- Predecessor: Honda Civic (first generation)
- Successor: Honda Civic (third generation)

The second-generation Honda Civic is an automobile produced by Honda from 1979 until 1983. It debuted in June 1979 with a more angular shape, increased engine power, and larger dimensions in all models. The design was closer aligned to its larger sister, the Accord, and the car was generally more comfortable and sophisticated than the first generation Honda Civic.

== Design ==
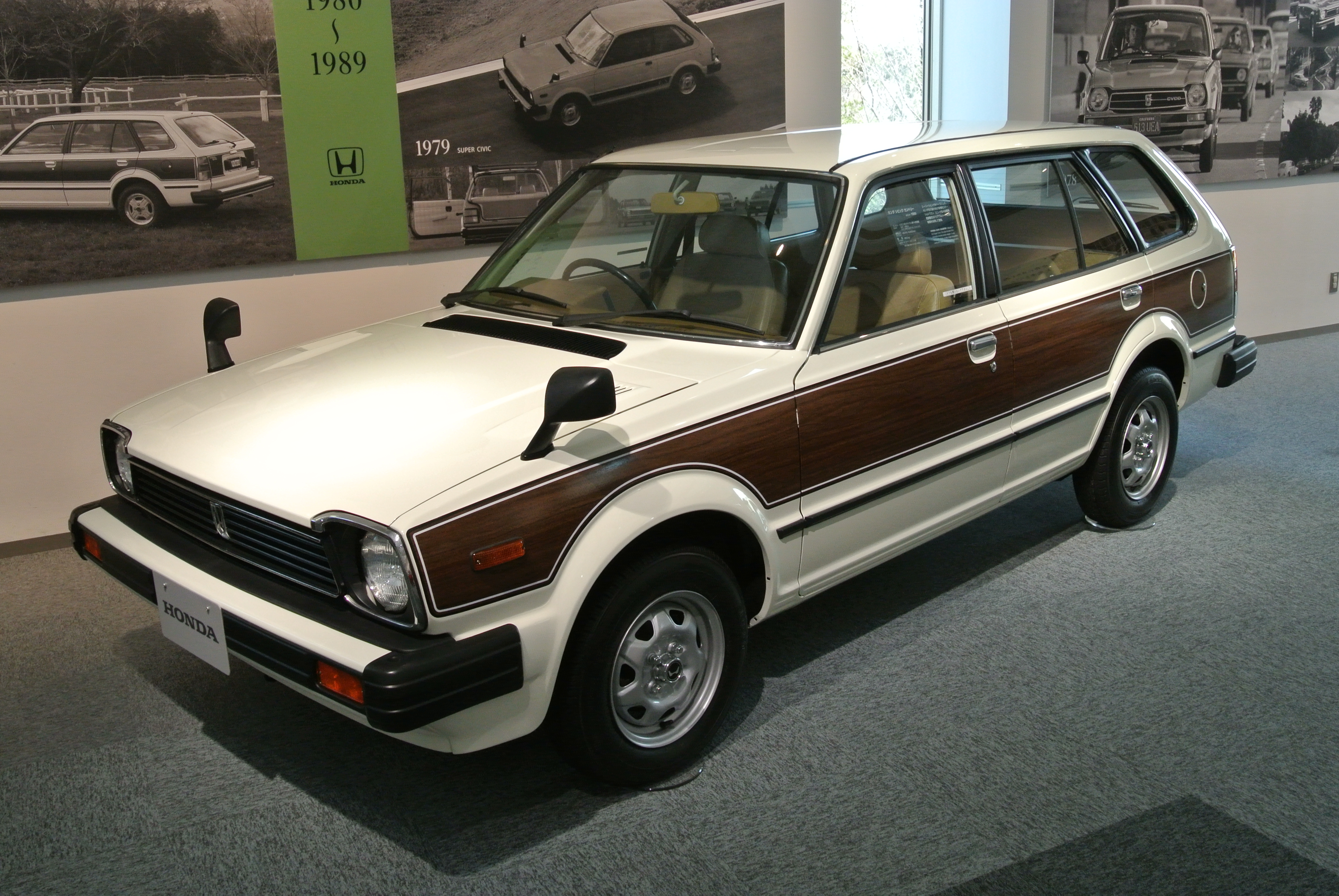
Honda Civic Country

The wheelbase now measured 2,250 mm (88.6 in) for the hatchback (the fastback sedan was no longer available) and 2,320 mm (91.3 in) for the wagon, 3-box design sedan, as well as the later five-door hatchback. The 1300 or 1500 cc Civic engines came in cross flow and CVCC design depending on the market they were sold in. In some countries, the 1169 cc EN3 engine was available as a base option. Three transmissions were offered: a four-speed manual (on base models), a five-speed manual, a two-speed Hondamatic, and then from 1981 a three-speed automatic.

=== North America ===
In North America, the Civic 1300 and 1500 both came in base and DX versions. The latter featured a five-speed manual transmission, partial cloth seats, carpet, rear window defroster, intermittent wipers, and a cigarette lighter. The 1500 GL added radial tires, a rear window wiper/washer, tachometer, clock, and body side moldings. The base 1335 cc ("1300") CVCC engine made 55 hp (41 kW; 56 PS), while the 1488 cc ("1500") CVCC engine produced 67 hp (50 kW; 68 PS). The Civic wagon was available only with the 1500 engine in a trim similar to the DX hatchback. The two engines still utilized cylinder heads of the CVCC type as before, but the 1500 engine could no longer meet US emissions standards without the use of a small two-way catalytic converter. As such, cars with the 1500 engine required the use of unleaded fuel. The 1300 engine — still capable of using leaded petrol — was not available in California and high-altitude areas of the United States.

The four-door sedan model came to the US for the 1981 model year, only available with the larger engine.

=== Europe ===
The standard European market 1.3-litre model produces 44 kW (60 PS; 59 hp) while the sporting "Civic S" (only available with a five-speed manual transmission) offered 51 kW (70 PS; 69 hp) thanks to twin carburettors. The European-spec Civic 1500 also produces 51 kW (70 PS; 69 hp) but was targeted at more comfort-oriented buyers.

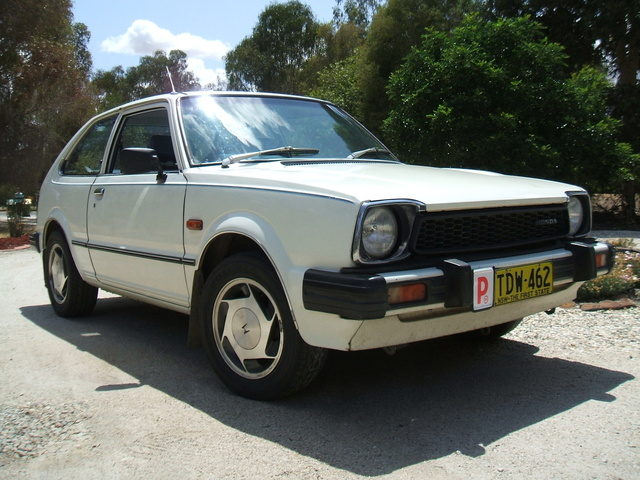
1981 Honda Civic 5 Speed (AUDM)

== History ==
In September 1979, a three-box four-door sedan debuted, as did a three-speed automatic transmission that replaced the aging two-speed unit fitted to the first-generation Civic. The four-door was also marketed as the Honda Ballade in the Japanese domestic market, and was also made under licence by British Leyland, badged as the Triumph Acclaim for the European market.

A minor facelift arrived in late 1980. In early 1982, another facelift added larger plastic bumpers, a new grille and rectangular headlights.

An upscale Civic-based five-door fastback arrived, called the Honda Quint in Japan. It was marketed at a Japanese dealership sales channel called Honda Verno along with the Honda Ballade, a high-luxury model based on the Civic sedan. Also introduced was a new highly fuel efficient I4 model, the five-speed "FE" (Fuel Economy) which was rated at 41 mpg_{‑US} (5.7 L/100 km; 49 mpg_{‑imp}) in the city and 55 mpg_{‑US} (4.3 L/100 km; 66 mpg_{‑imp}) on the highway. However, even the standard 1500-cc model achieves 34 mpg_{‑US} (6.9 L/100 km; 41 mpg_{‑imp}) city, and 47 mpg_{‑US} (5.0 L/100 km; 56 mpg_{‑imp}) highway when driven 55 mph (89 km/h), the maximum U.S. speed limit at the time (California mileage ratings).

The slogan for 1983 Civic was We Make It Simple.

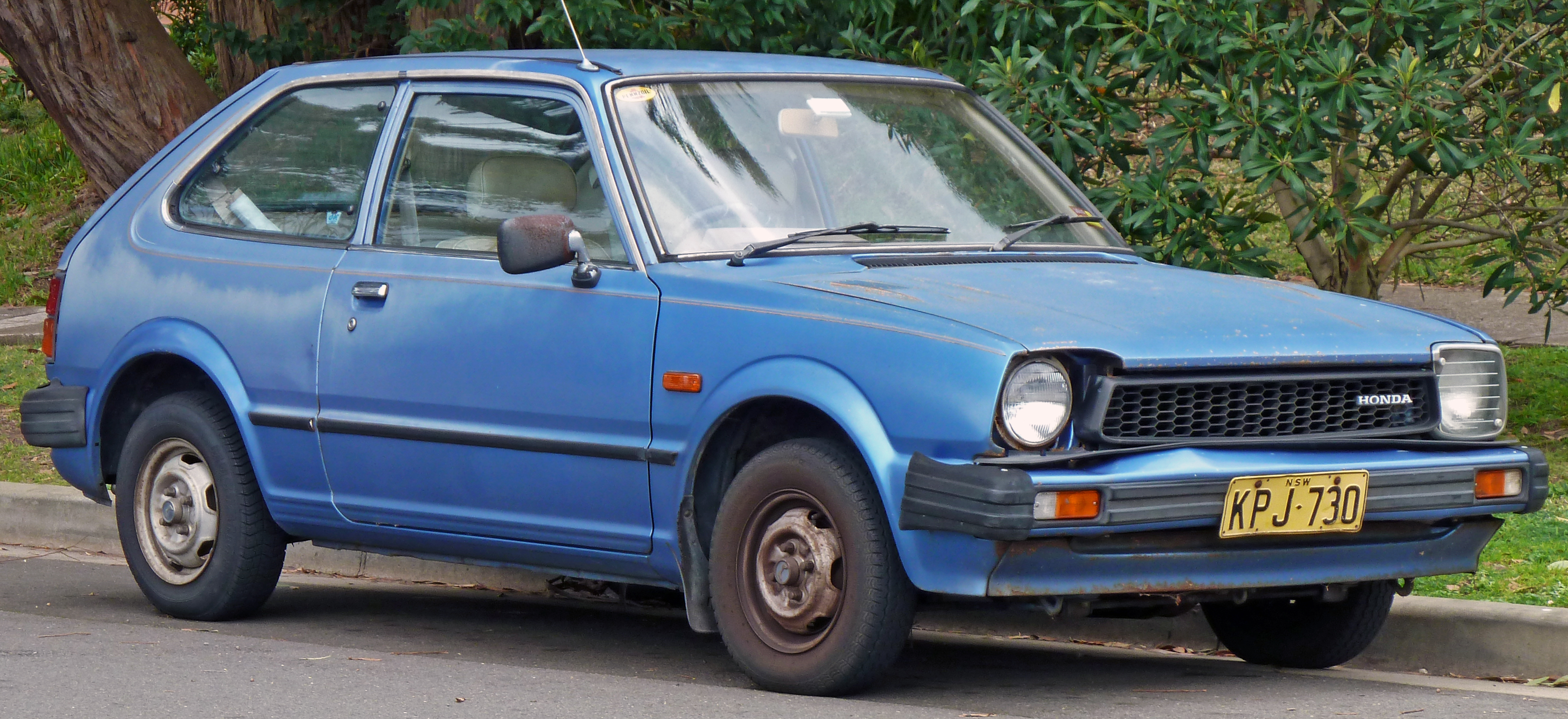
3-door (pre-facelift)

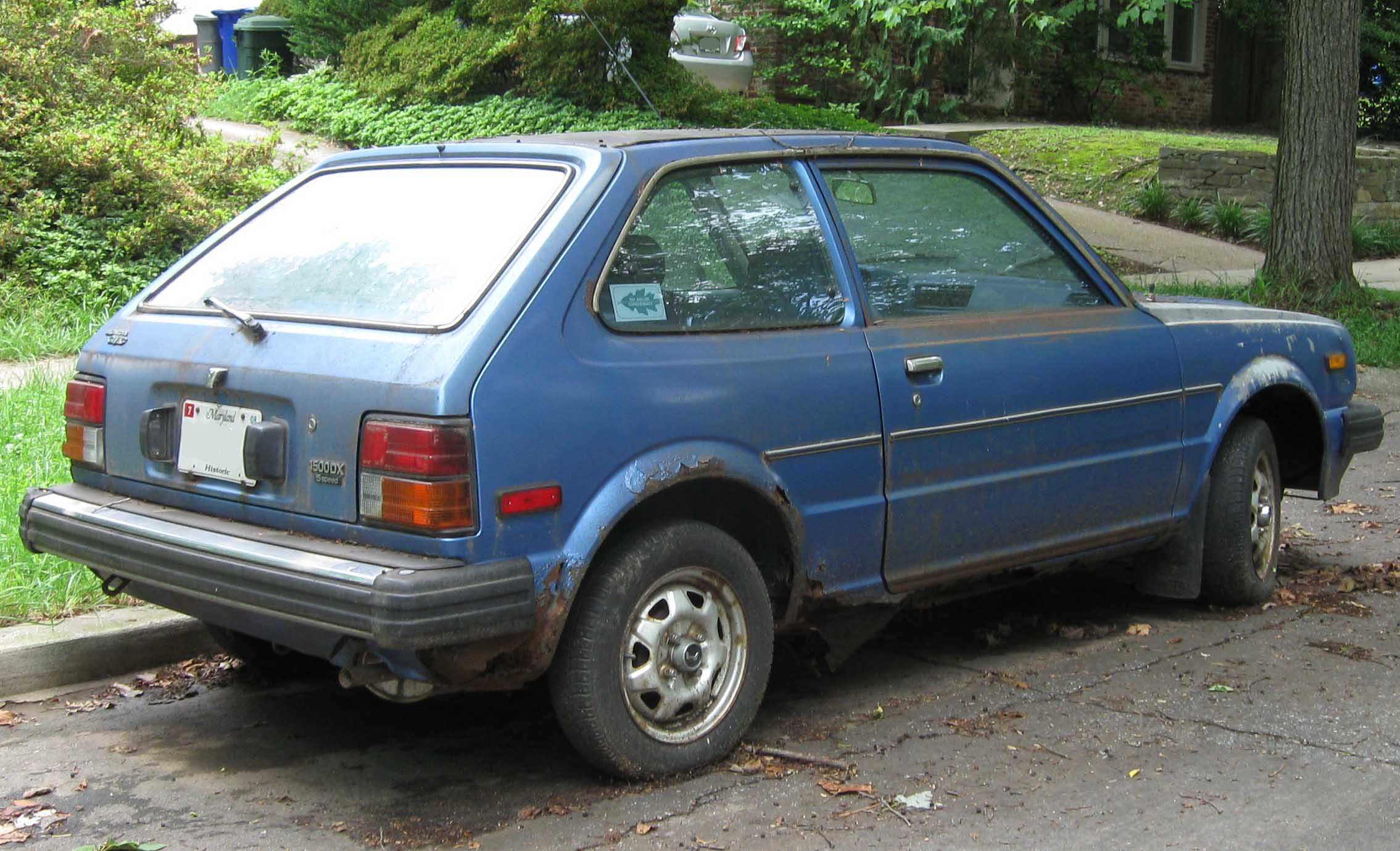
3-door (pre-facelift)

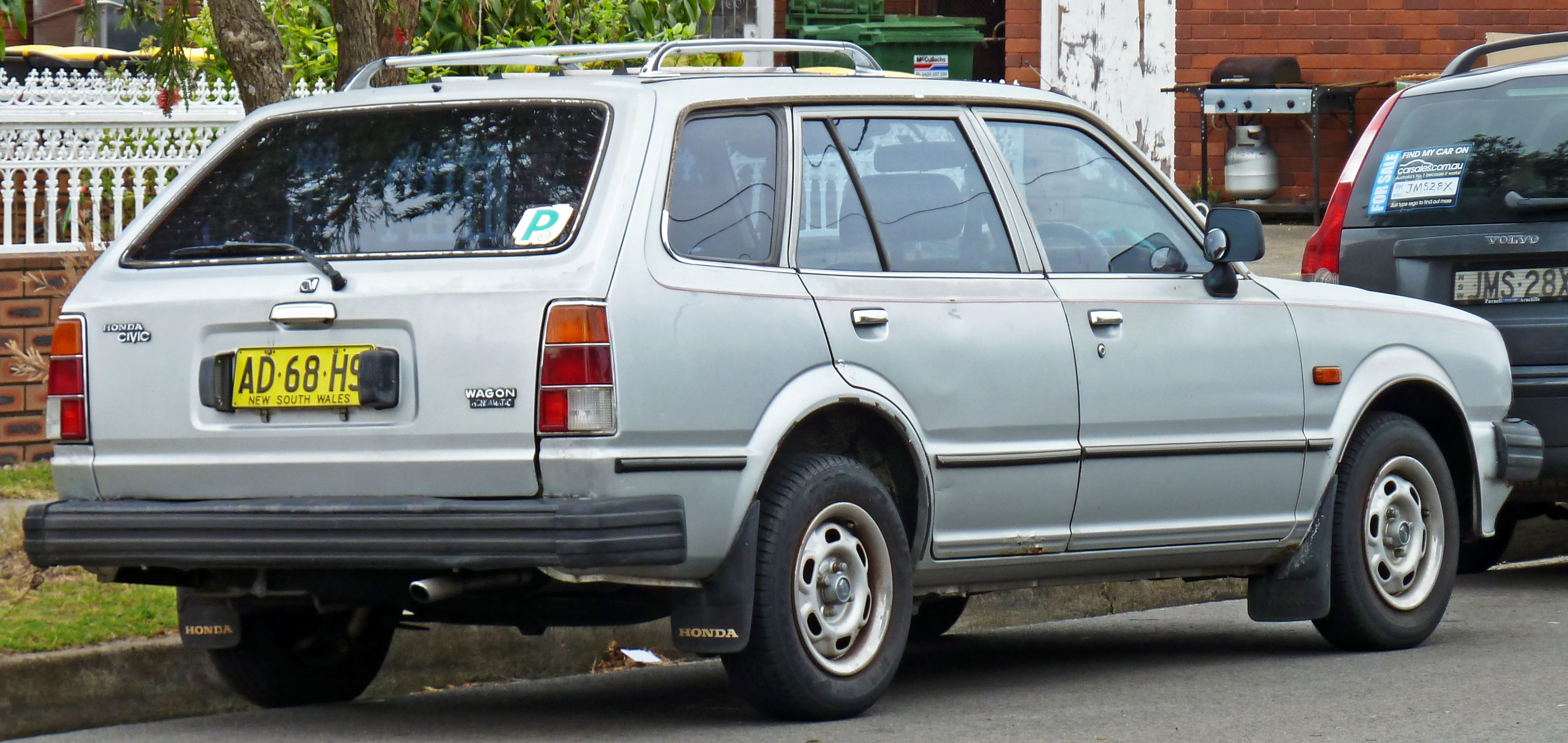
Wagon (pre-facelift)

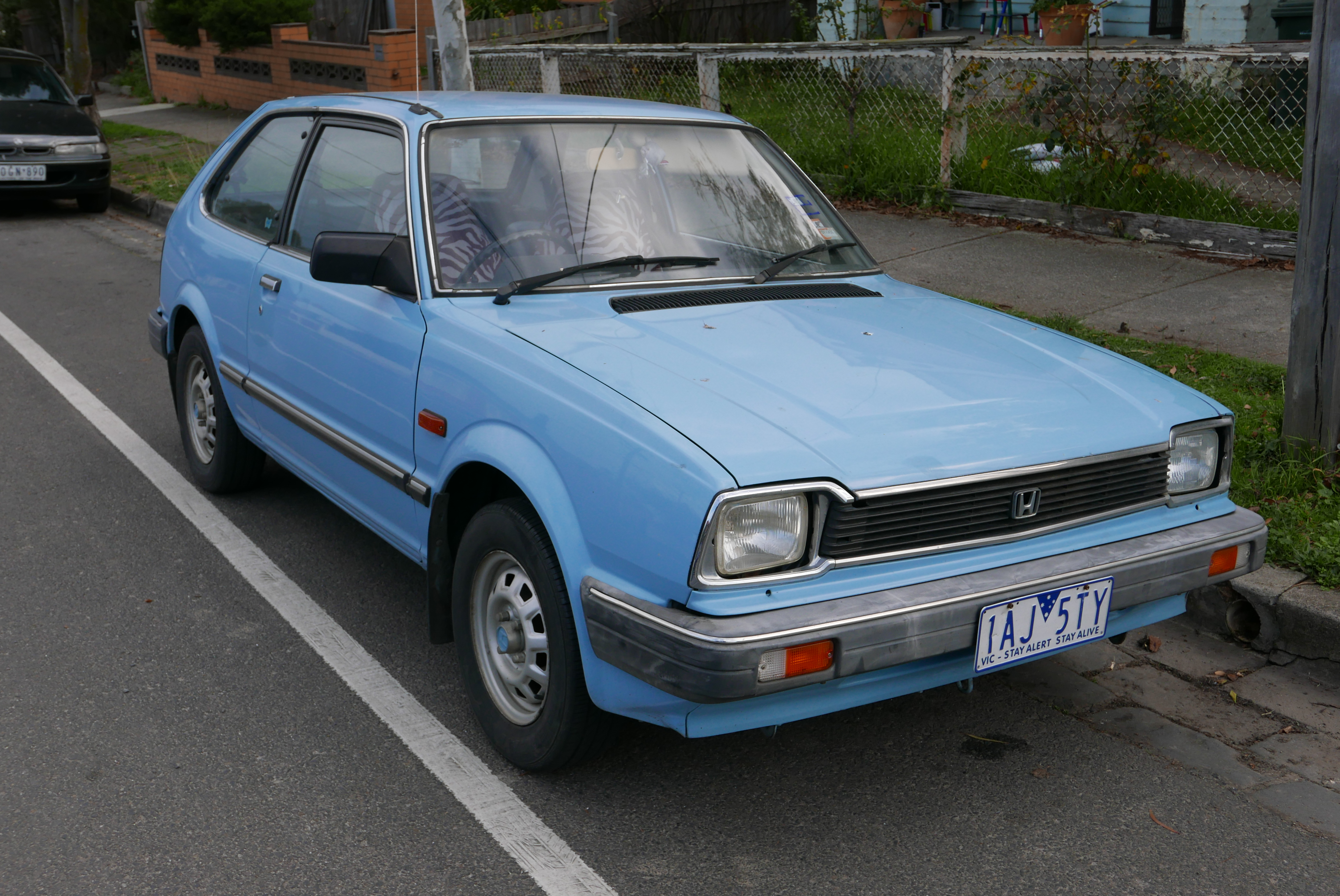
3-door (facelift)

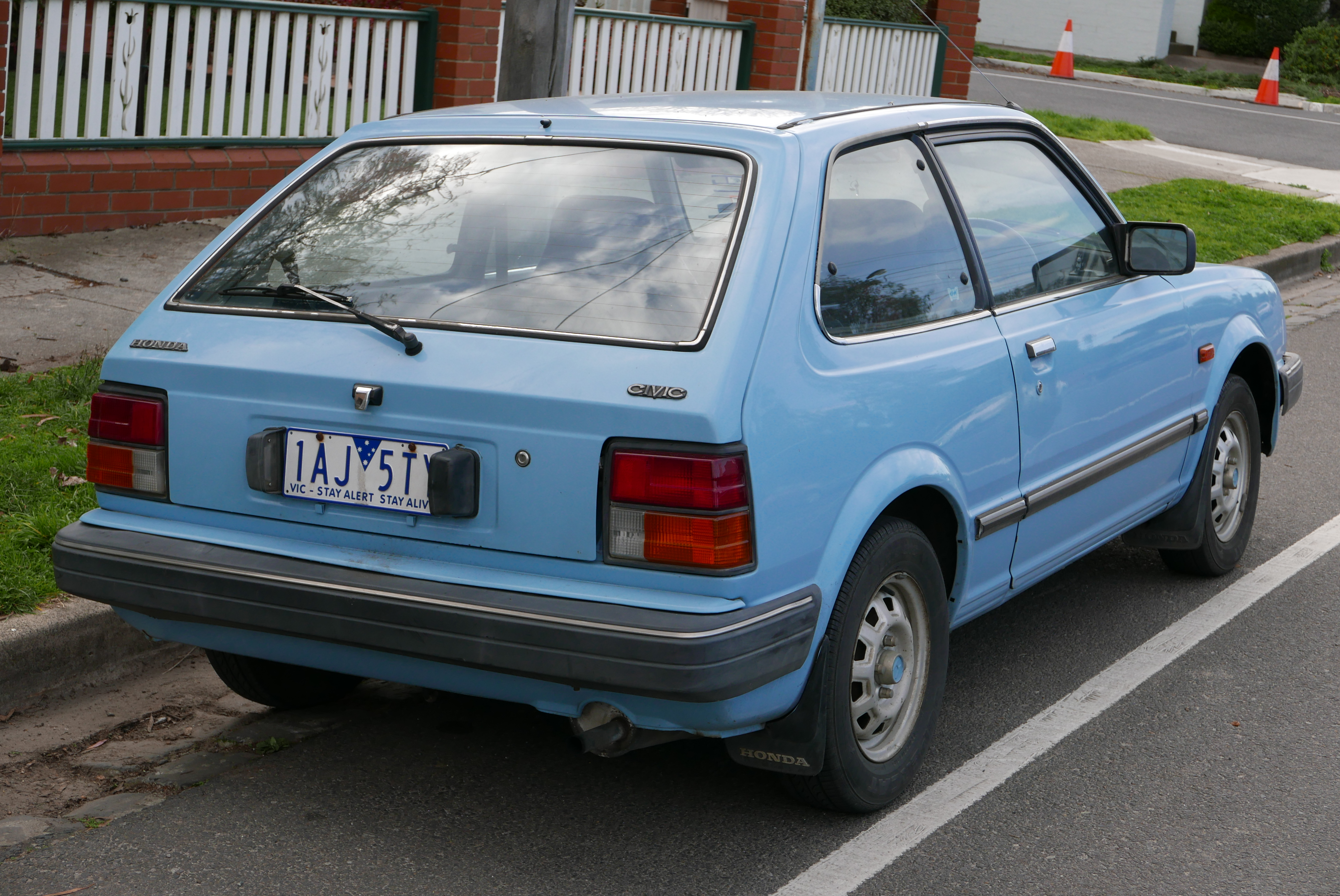
3-door (facelift)

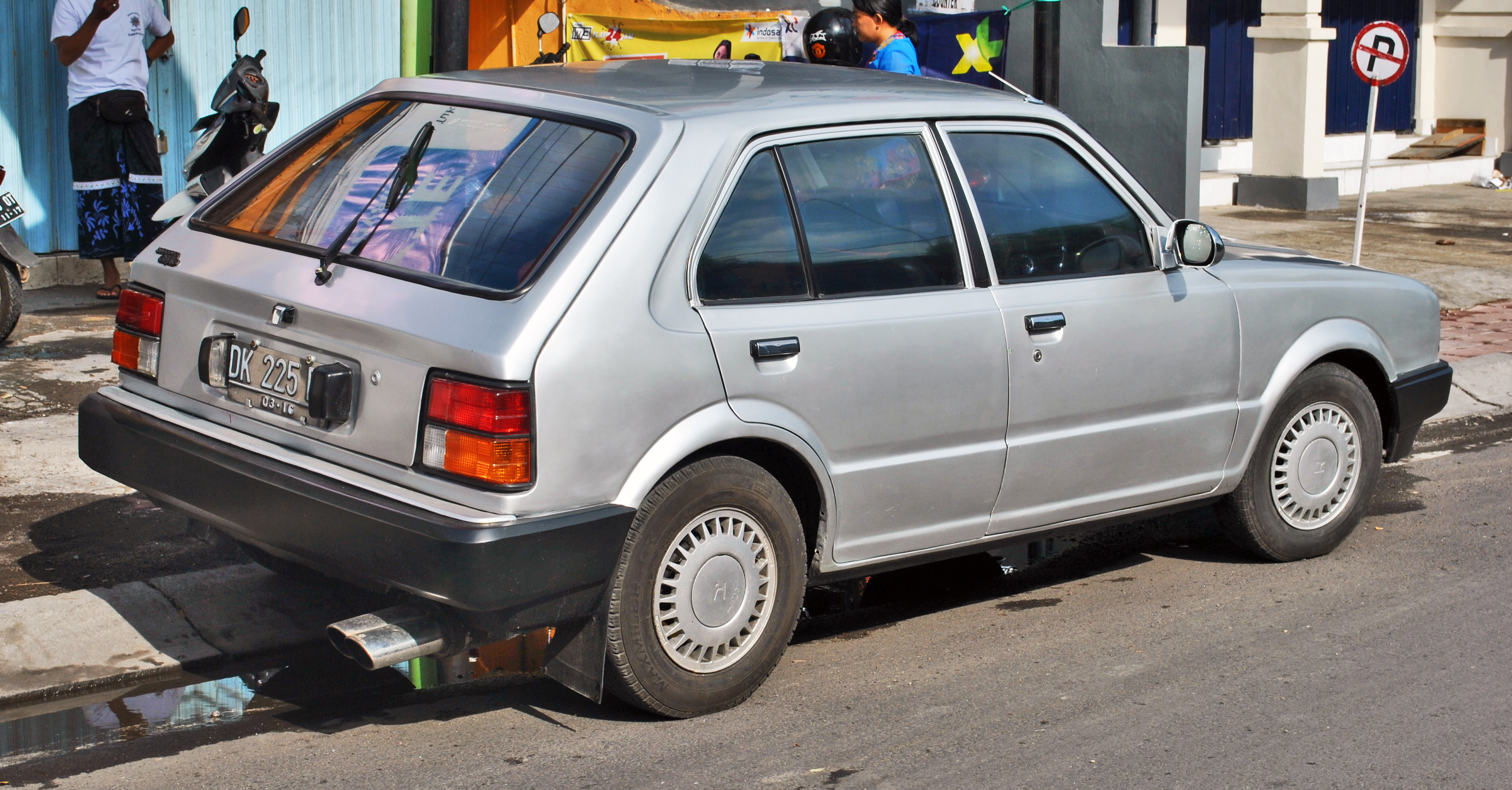
5-door (facelift)

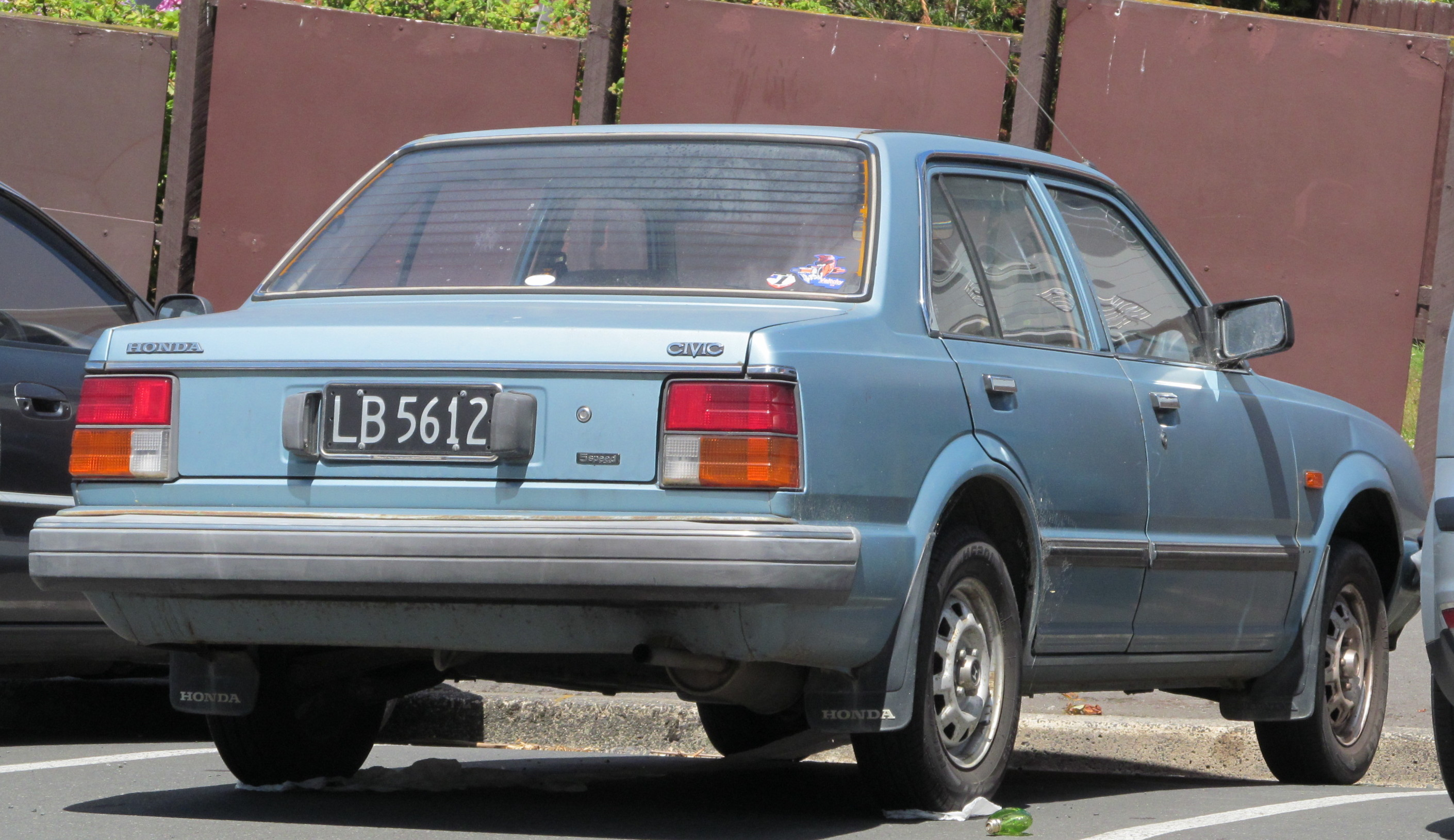
Sedan

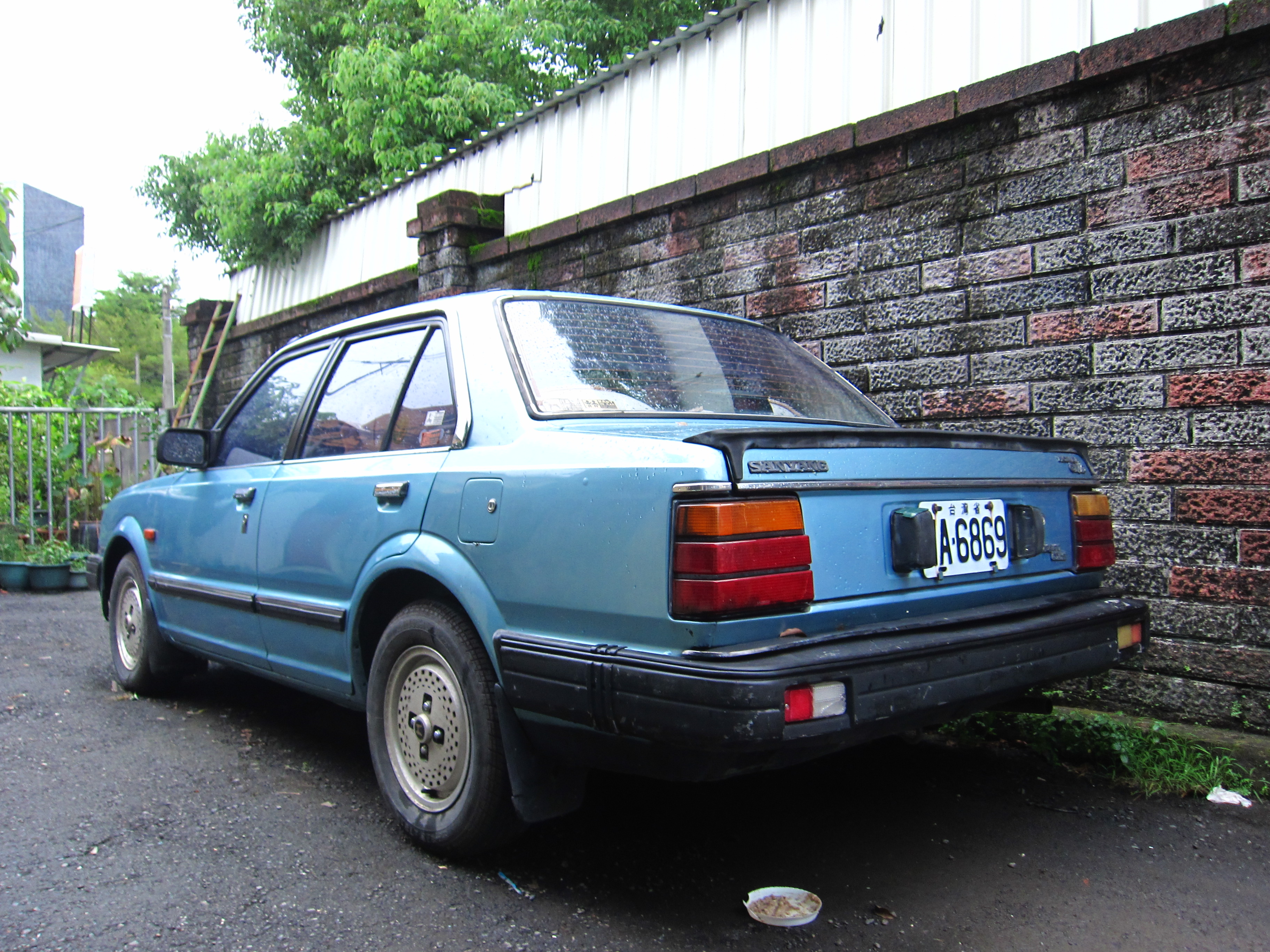
Sedan (Taiwanese model)

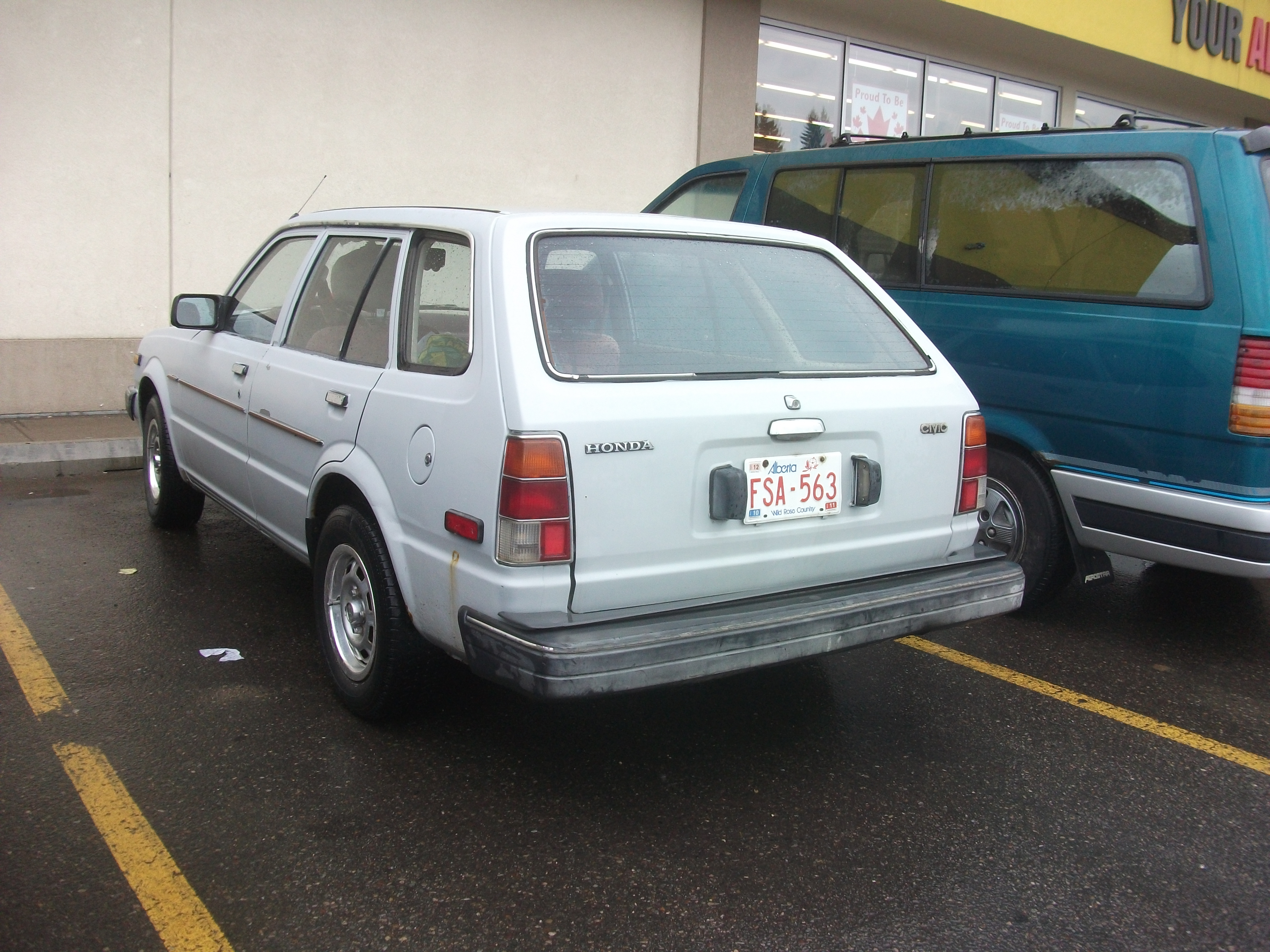
Wagon (facelift)

== Sporting variants ==
A sport-oriented Civic "CX" was introduced in 1979 in Japan and powered with 1488 cc CVCC EM engine, fitted with firmer suspension, rear stabilizer bar and 165/70R13 Michelin tires. In 1980, new grade called "CX-S" was added to the line up, this model was available with sunroof. This model has a red accent encircled the "CX-S" and set it apart from other Civics as well as a black grille and blackout paint around the window frames. In 1983, appeared another sport model for overseas with "S" badge, this has similar appearance like the Japanese "CX-S". This model was powered with two different engines. In North America, the engine was similar to Japanese "CX" model but with lower output, but in some markets such as the UK, it was powered with the high performance 1335 cc EN4, which was of traditional cross-flow design, and was fitted with twin Keihin CV carburettors, and the same camshaft that was fitted to the earlier first generation GL models. The twin carburettors were similar to the design used by the 1200RS models of the mid-70s, using the same intake manifold, however Honda updated the configuration by fitting twin velocity stacks to help increase bottom-end and mid-range response. The Civic "CX" was available in white and orange, while "CX-S" and "S" was available in red and black paint colours.

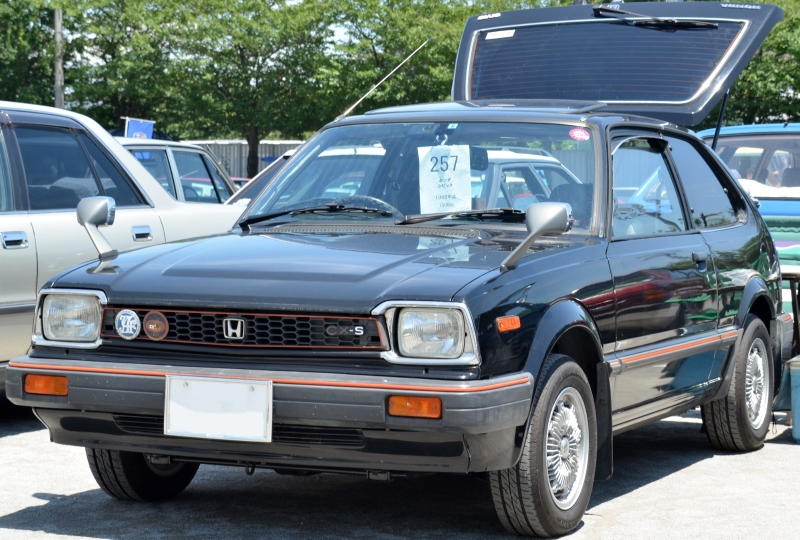
Honda Civic CX-S (Japan)

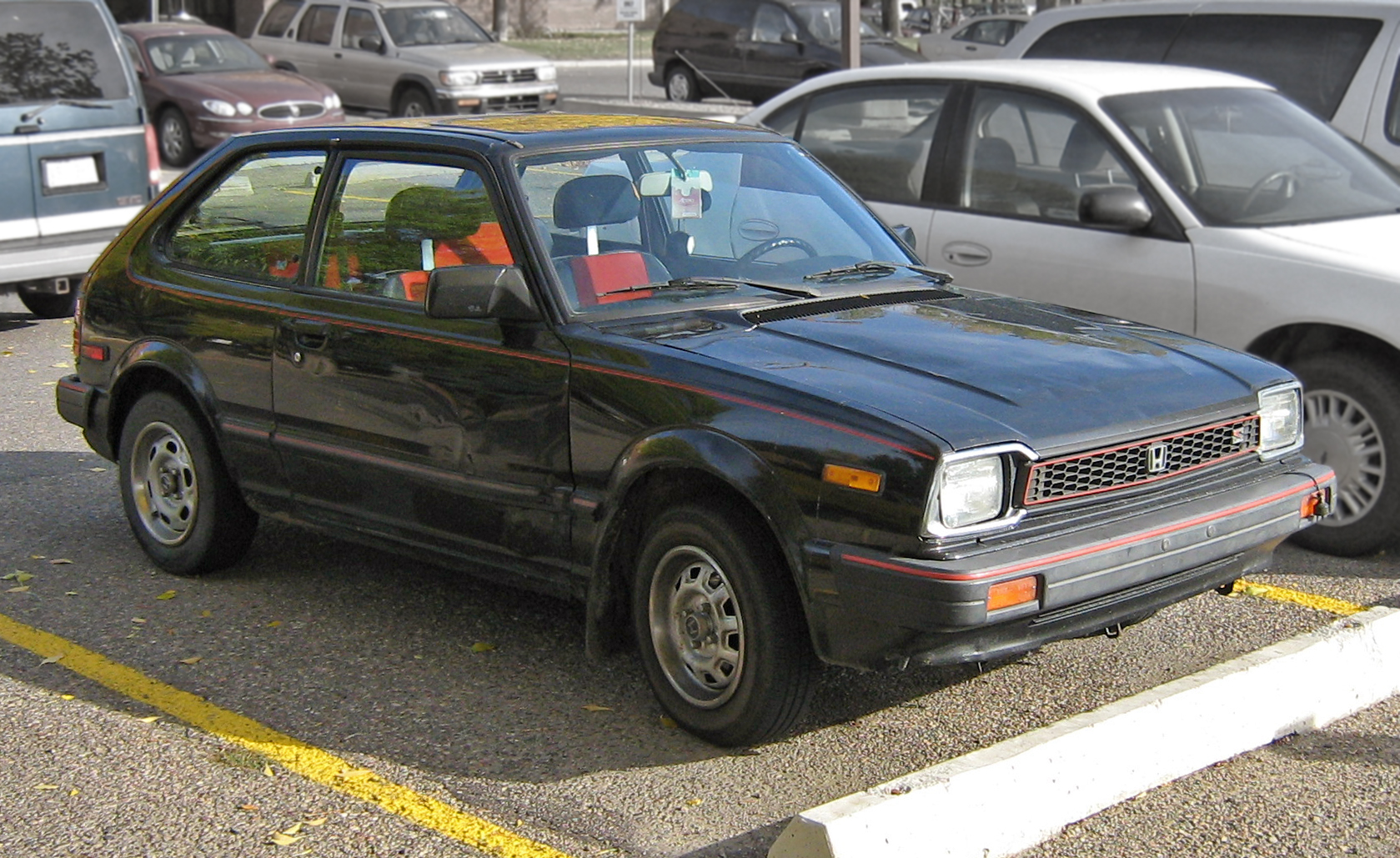
Honda Civic S (Canada)

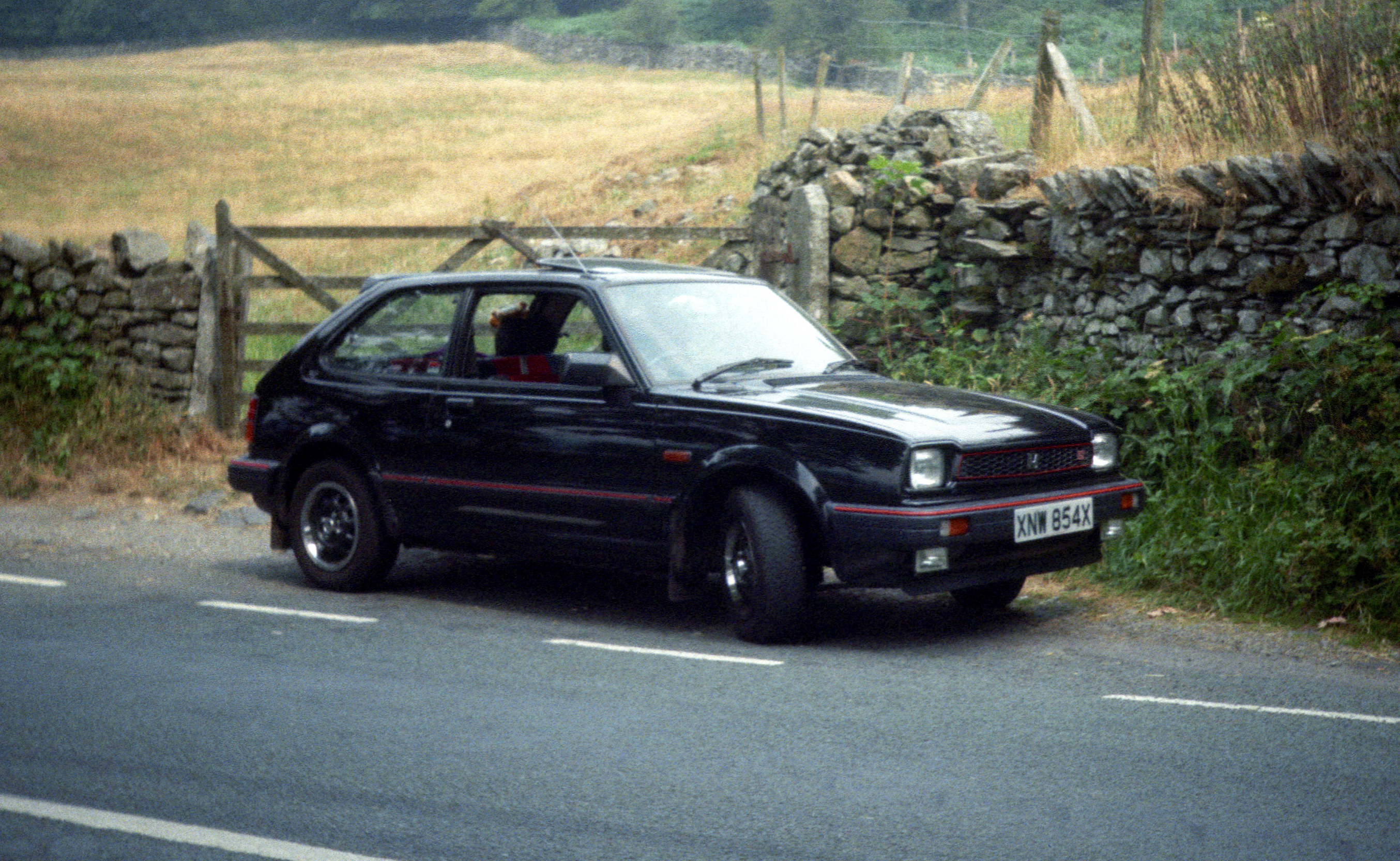
1982 UK Spec Honda Civic S with 1355 EN4 engine

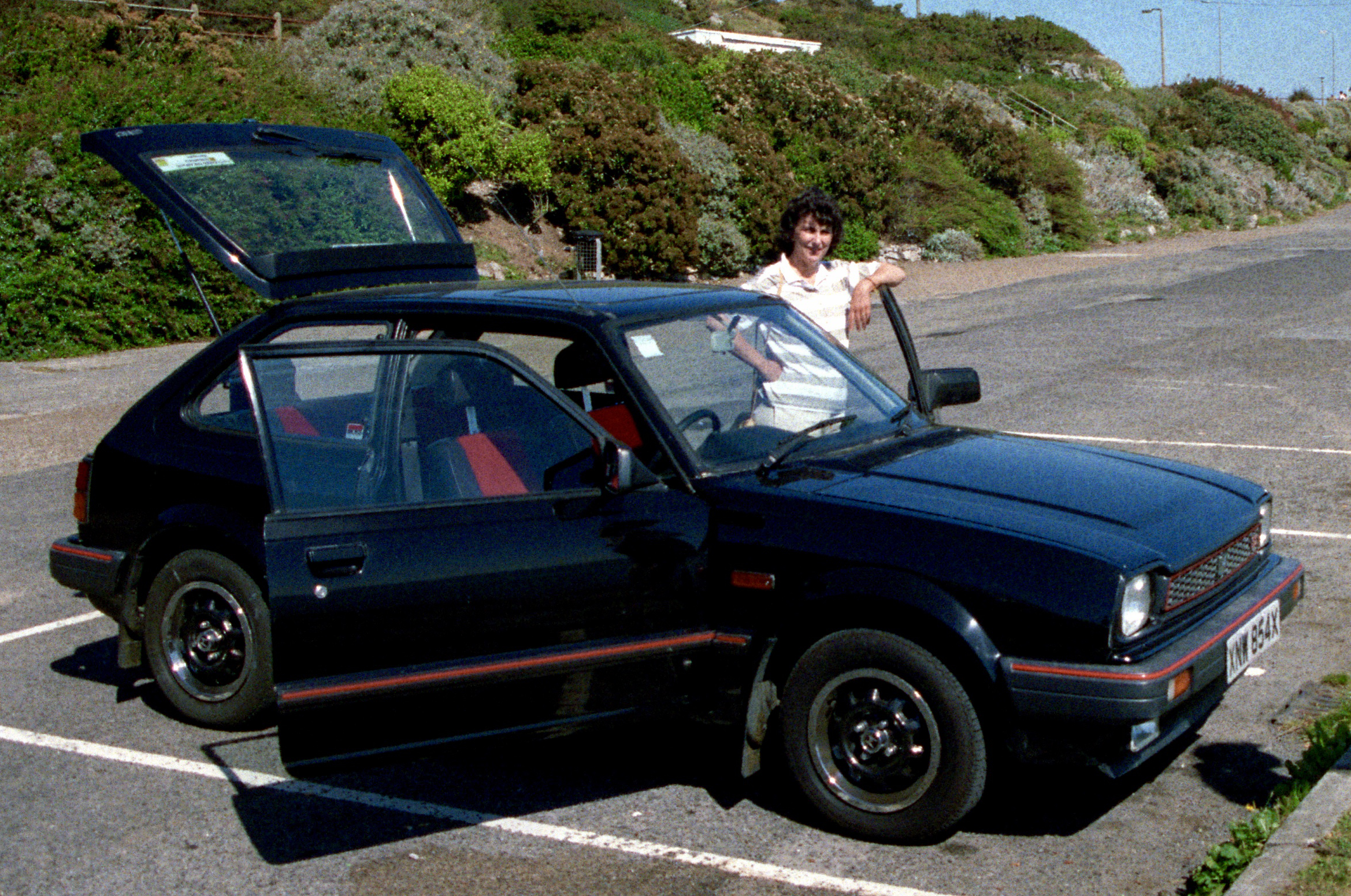
1982 UK Spec Honda Civic S with 1355 EN4 engine
