= List of places in California (Q) =

List of places in California - Q

This list of current:

- cities
- towns, unincorporated communities
- counties, and other recognized places in the U.S. state of California.

Information on the number and names of counties in which the place lies, and its lower and upper ZIP Code bounds, if applicable are also included.

Name of place	Number of counties	Principal county	Lower zip code	Upper zip code
Quail	1	Tulare County		
Quail Valley	1	Riverside County	92587	
Quaker Meadow	1	Tulare County		
Quaking Aspen	1	Tulare County	93265	
Quality	1	Kern County		
Quartz	1	Tuolumne County	95327	
Quartz Hill	1	Los Angeles County	93536	
Quartz Valley Rancheria	1	Siskiyou County	93551	
Queen City	1	Sierra County		
Quigley	1	San Joaquin County		
Quincy	1	Plumas County	95971	
Quincy-East Quincy	1	Plumas County		
Quincy Junction	1	Plumas County		
Quintette	1	El Dorado County		
Quito	1	Santa Clara County	95070	
