= Quintette =

Quintette may refer to:

- Quintette, California
- Quintette du Hot Club de France

== See also ==
- Quintet (disambiguation)
