= Honda E engine =

Former Japanese automobile engines

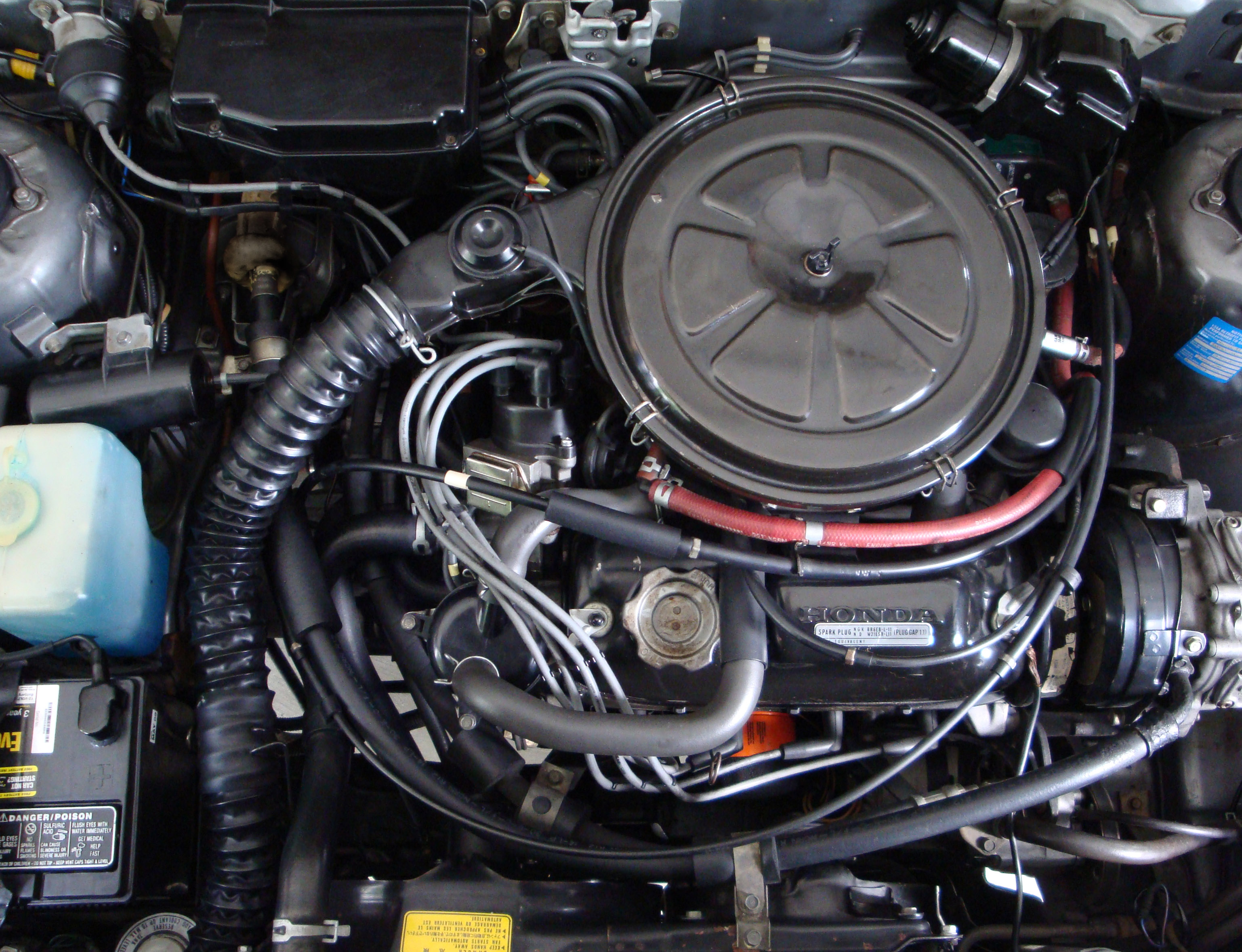
- 1751 cc EK1 Engine in a 1983 Honda Accord

Overview
- Manufacturer: Honda
- Production: 1971–1987

Layout
- Configuration: Inline-2, Inline-4
- Displacement: 0.4–1.8 L (356–1,829 cc)
- Cylinder bore: 66 mm (2.6 in); 67 mm (2.64 in); 70 mm (2.76 in); 72 mm (2.83 in); 74 mm (2.91 in); 77 mm (3.03 in)
- Piston stroke: 50.6 mm (1.99 in); 67 mm (2.64 in); 69 mm (2.72 in); 76 mm (2.99 in); 82 mm (3.23 in); 86 mm (3.39 in); 86.5 mm (3.41 in); 90 mm (3.54 in); 93 mm (3.66 in); 94 mm (3.7 in)
- Valvetrain: SOHC 2 or 3 valves x cyl.
- Compression ratio: 7.4:1-10.2:1

Combustion
- Turbocharger: IHI with intercooler (on some versions)
- Fuel system: Keihin carburetor or PGM-FI
- Fuel type: Gasoline
- Cooling system: Water-cooled

Output
- Power output: 28–130 PS (21–96 kW; 28–128 hp)
- Torque output: 4.2–16.3 kg⋅m (41–160 N⋅m; 30–118 lb⋅ft)

The E-series was a line of inline four-cylinder automobile engines designed and built by Honda for use in their cars in the 1970s and 1980s. These engines were notable for the use of CVCC technology, introduced in the ED1 engine in the 1975 Civic, which met 1970s emissions standards without using a catalytic converter.

The CVCC ED1 was on the Ward's 10 Best Engines of the 20th century list.

== EA ==
Also see the Japanese Wikipedia entry

The EA-series is a water-cooled 356 cc (21.7 cu in) inline two-cylinder engine replacing the N360's air-cooled 354 cc (21.6 cu in) engine. An SOHC design with a timing belt (replacing the chain used in the N360 engine), the EA was first seen in the 1971 Honda Life. This engine was derived from the air-cooled engine in the Honda CB450 and was adapted for water-cooled application. The displacement was reduced to be in compliance with Japanese kei car legislation that stipulated maximum engine displacement. Bore and stroke were 67 mm × 50.6 mm (2.64 in × 1.99 in). A version producing 30 PS (22 kW) at 8,000 rpm was installed in the Honda Life, while the Honda Z and the Honda Life Touring (introduced in May 1972) received a twin-carb model with 36 PS (26 kW) at a heady 9,000 rpm.

- 1971.06-1974 Honda Life
- 1972.11-1974 Honda Z

== EB ==
The aluminium-block EB series was fitted to the first generation Honda Civic, although the cast-iron EB5 was installed in the short-lived Honda 145. A 1.3-liter racing version of this engine called the MF318 was developed by Mugen and used successfully in the Japanese FJ1300 racing series. The MF318 was Mugen's first product; while fast and popular with many times it was not particularly reliable.

- Displacement 1,169 cc (71.3 cu in)
- Bore & Stroke 70 mm × 76 mm (2.76 in × 2.99 in)
- compression ratio: 8.6:1
- Valve Train: SOHC 8-valve
- design with a 2 barrel carburetor or 1 carburetor
- Power: 69 PS (51 kW; 68 hp) at 5,500 rpm
- Torque: 10.2 kg⋅m (100 N⋅m; 74 lb⋅ft) at 4,000 rpm
- Max Speed: 155 km/h (96 mph) estimated

EB2/EB3

- The EB2 and EB3 displace 1,237 cc (75.5 cu in) and different diameter valves in the head. A CVCC version was also developed later, called the "EE".
- Bore & Stroke 72 mm × 76 mm (2.83 in × 2.99 in)
- Valve Train: SOHC 8-valve
- design with a 2 barrel carburetor or 1 carburetor
- Power: 64 PS (47 kW; 63 hp) at 5,000 rpm and
- Torque: 10.6 kg⋅m (104 N⋅m; 77 lb⋅ft) at 3,000 rpm

EB5

- Displacement 1,433 cc (87.4 cu in)
- Bore & Stroke 70 mm × 88 mm (2.76 in × 3.46 in)
- compression ratio: 8.6:1
- Valve Train: SOHC 8-valve
- design with a 2 barrel carburetor or fuel injection
- Power: 79 PS (58 kW; 78 hp) at 5,500 rpm or 90 PS (66 kW; 89 hp) at 5,500 rpm
- Torque: 87 lb⋅ft (118 N⋅m) at 4,000 rpm or 91 lb⋅ft (123 N⋅m) at 4,000 rpm

Applications:

EB1

- 1973- Honda Civic

EB2

- 1974-1979 Honda Civic

EB3

- 1978-1979 Honda Civic

EB5

- 1972-1974 Honda 145

== EC ==
  - Displaced 1.5 L (1,488 cc)
  - Bore & Stroke 74 mm × 86.5 mm (2.91 in × 3.41 in).
  - compression ratio: 8.1, 8.4 (Van)
  - Valve Train: SOHC 8-valve
  - design with a 2 barrel carburetor.
  - Fel control: electric fuel pump
  - Power: 65 PS (48 kW; 64 hp) at 5,500 rpm

76 PS (56 kW; 75 hp) at 5,500 rpm (1979 Civic Van)

  - Torque: 10.5 kg⋅m (103 N⋅m; 76 lb⋅ft) at 3,000 rpm

11.1 kg⋅m (109 N⋅m; 80 lb⋅ft) at 3,500 rpm (1979 Civic Van)

  - Oil Capacity: 3.5 L (3.7 US qt; 3.1 imp qt)

- EC
  - 1975-1979 Honda Civic 4 doors
  - 1975-1979 Honda Civic Van (VB)

== ED ==
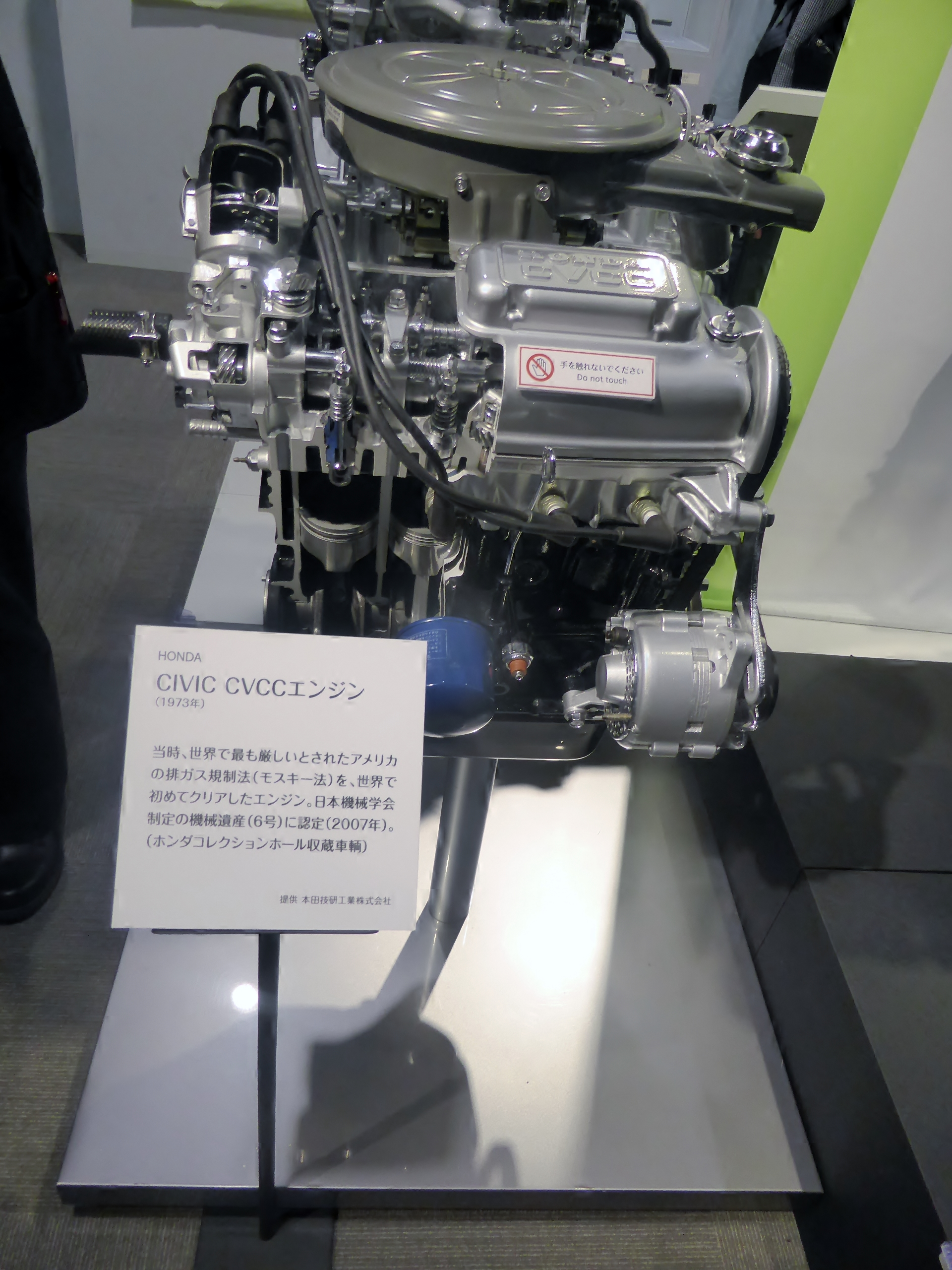
The ED engine in Honda's museum

The ED series introduced the CVCC technology; it is otherwise the same as the contemporary EC engine. It displaced 1.5 L; 90.8 cu in (1,488 cc) and used an SOHC 12-valve design. Output with a 3 barrel carburetor was 53 PS (39 kW; 52 hp) at 5000 rpm and 9.4 kg⋅m (92 N⋅m; 68 lb⋅ft) at 3000 rpm.

- ED1
  - 1975- Honda Civic CVCC
- ED2
  - 1975- Honda Civic Wagon
- ED3
  - 1976-1979 Honda Civic CVCC
- ED4
  - 1976-1979 Honda Civic Wagon

== EE ==
The EE series applied the CVCC technology to the 1.2 L (1,237 cc; 75.5 cu in) and used an SOHC 12-valve design. It was replaced by the 1.3-liter EJ engine in 1978. The EE engine produces 63 PS (46 kW) at 5500 rpm and 9.5 kg⋅m (93 N⋅m; 69 lb⋅ft) at 3500 rpm.

- August 1975-June 1978 Honda Civic CVCC

== EF ==
- Displaced 1.6 L; 97.6 cu in (1,599 cc)
- Bore & Stroke 74 mm × 93 mm (2.91 in × 3.66 in)
- compression ratio: 8.0:1
- Valve Train: SOHC 12-valve CVCC
- design with a 3 barrel carburetor.
- Fuel control: electric fuel pump
- Power: 82 PS (60 kW; 81 hp) at 5,300 rpm
- Torque: 12.35 kg⋅m (121 N⋅m; 89 lb⋅ft) at 3,000 rpm
- Cast iron block & aluminum cylinder head
- Six port cylinder head (four intake ports and two exhaust ports)
- Valve order (IEEIIEEI)
- Three barrel Keihin carburettor (1976 & 1977 had manual choke, 1978 and up cars received an automatic choke)
- Point type ignition

USAGE: 1976-1978 Honda Accord CVCC, US market automobiles.

== EG ==
The EG displaced 1.6 L; 97.5 cu in (1,598 cc) and was an SOHC 8-valve engine with a 2 barrel carburetor. Output was 69 PS (51 kW; 68 hp) at 5000 rpm and 11.7 kg⋅m (115 N⋅m; 85 lb⋅ft) at 3000 rpm.

EG

1976-1978 Honda Accord Non USDM

== EH ==
The water-cooled SOHC two-cylinder EH was first seen installed in the first generation Honda Acty truck introduced in July 1977, and later in the 1985 Honda Today. It was based on one bank of cylinders from the horizontally opposed four used on the Honda Gold Wing GL1000 motorcycle, with which it shared the 72 mm (2.83 in) bore. The horsepower rating of the 545 cc (33.3 cu in) 72 mm × 67 mm (2.83 in × 2.64 in) engine was 28 PS (21 kW) at 5,500 rpm, and 4.2 kg⋅m (41 N⋅m; 30 lb⋅ft) at 4,000 rpm. When installed in the Today, max power was raised to 31 PS (23 kW) at the same revs, and torque at 4.4 kg⋅m (43 N⋅m; 32 lb⋅ft), with a compression ratio of 9.5:1.

Applications:

- 1977.07-1988.05 Honda Acty
- 1985.09-1988.02 Honda Today

== EJ ==
  - Displaced 1.3 L (1,335 cc)
  - Bore & Stroke 72 mm × 82 mm (2.83 in × 3.23 in)
  - compression ratio: 7.9:1
  - Valve Train: SOHC 12-valve auxiliary valve CVCC
  - Fuel Control: Electric fuel pump
  - Power: 68 PS (50 kW; 67 hp) at 5,500 rpm
  - Torque: 10 kg⋅m (98 N⋅m; 72 lb⋅ft) at 3,500 rpm
  - Max Speed: 155 km (96 mi) estimated
  - Oil Capacity: 3 L (3.2 US qt; 2.6 imp qt)
- EJ
  - June 1978-July 1979 Honda Civic 1300 (SK/SP)
- EJ1
  - July 1979 – 1983 Honda Civic CVCC

== EK ==
The EK was an SOHC 12-valve (CVCC) engine, displacing 1.8 L (1,751 cc). Output varied (see below) as the engine itself was refined. This was the last CVCC configuration engine manufactured by Honda.

  - Displaced 1.8 L (1,751 cc)
  - Bore & Stroke 77 mm × 94 mm (3.03 in × 3.70 in)
  - compression ratio: 8.8:1
  - design with a 3 barrel carburetor.
  - Fuel control: electric fuel pump
  - Power: 97 PS (71 kW; 96 hp) at 5,500 rpm
  - Torque: 14.3 kg⋅m (140 N⋅m; 103 lb⋅ft) at 3,000 rpm
  - Cast iron block & aluminum cylinder head
  - Three barrel Keihin carburetor (all were automatic choke)
  - Electronic ignition (Nippon Denso or Tec Electronics)
  - Oil cooler (or provision for this in the block)

- Cylinder head iterations:
  - Six port cylinder head (4 intake port / 2 exhaust ports) & IEEIIEEI valve order for 1979 & 1980 49 state
  - Eight Port cylinder head (4 intake port / 4 exhaust ports) & IEEIIEEI valve order for 1980 (California only) and 1981 (50 states)
  - Eight Port cylinder head (4 intake port / 4 exhaust ports) & EIEIIEIE valve order from 1982 to end of CVCC production (1985)
- Power: 6-port output was 73 PS (54 kW; 72 hp) at 4500 rpm and 13 kg⋅m (127 N⋅m; 94 lb⋅ft) at 3,000 rpm, while the original 8-port head raised this to 76 PS (56 kW; 75 hp) at 4500 rpm and 13.3 kg⋅m (130 N⋅m; 96 lb⋅ft) at 3000 rpm. The revised 4-port (82 & later) had another slight horsepower increase.

USAGE:
1979-1983 Honda Accord CVCC (US market)
1979-1982 Honda Prelude CVCC (US market)
1981-1983 Honda Accord/Vigor (JDM)

EK9 is not related to the EK engine; EK is also the chassis code for several versions of the sixth generation Honda Civic. EK9 is the chassis code for 1997-2000 Honda Civic Type R.

== EL ==
The EL displaced 1.6 L; 97.8 cu in (1,602 cc) and was an SOHC eight-valve engine with a two-barrel carburetor. Output in North American configuration is 79 PS (58 kW; 78 hp) at 5,000 rpm and 12.8 kg⋅m (126 N⋅m; 93 lb⋅ft) at 3,000 rpm.

  - Displaced 1.6 L; 97.8 cu in (1,602 cc)
  - Bore & Stroke 77 mm × 86 mm (3.03 in × 3.39 in)
  - compression ratio: 8.4:1
  - Valve Train: SOHC 8-valve
  - design with a 2 barrel carburetor.
  - Fuel control: electric fuel pump
  - Power: 73.5 PS (54 kW; 72 hp) SAE at 5,000 rpm
  - Torque: 12.4 kg⋅m (122 N⋅m; 90 lb⋅ft) at 3,000 rpm
  - Oil Capacity: 3.5 L (3.7 US qt; 3.1 imp qt)

- EL1
  - 1979-1983 Honda Accord Non USDM
  - 1979-1982 Honda Prelude (Australian and Canadian models) Non USDM

== EM ==
  - Displaced 1.5 L; 90.8 cu in (1,488 cc)
  - Bore & Stroke 74 mm × 86.5 mm (2.91 in × 3.41 in)
  - compression ratio: 8.8:1
  - Valve Train: SOHC 12-valve auxiliar valve CVCC
  - design with a 2 barrel carburetor or 3 barrel carburetor.
  - Fuel control: electric fuel pump
  - Power: 80 PS (59 kW; 79 hp) at 5,500 rpm
  - Torque: 12.5 kg⋅m (123 N⋅m; 90 lb⋅ft) at 3,500 rpm
  - Oil Capacity: 3 L (3.2 US qt; 2.6 imp qt)

- EM1
  - 1980 Honda Civic, 53 PS (39 kW; 52 hp)
  - 1981-1983 Honda Civic, 64 PS (47 kW; 63 hp)

== EN ==
The EN displaced 1.3 L; 81.5 cu in (1,335 cc). It had a single overhead cam and eight-valve head, and was fitted to Civics in all markets aside from the United States domestic market. In Europe it also found a home in the Honda Ballade-based Triumph Acclaim. Both block and head are from aluminium.

- EN1
  - 1980-1983 Honda Civic, single carb, 61 PS (45 kW; 60 bhp)
- EN4
  - 1981-1984 Honda Civic S and Triumph Acclaim, twin carb, 72 PS (53 kW; 71 bhp)

== EP ==
The EP was an SOHC 12-valve (CVCC) engine, displacing 1.6 L (1,601 cc). It was essentially an EL 1.6 L block with an EK 1.8 L cylinder head.

  - Displaced 1.6 L; 97.7 cu in (1,601 cc)
  - Bore & Stroke 77 mm × 86 mm (3.03 in × 3.39 in)
  - compression ratio: 8.8:1
  - Valve Train: SOHC 12-valve
  - design with a 3 barrel carburetor.
  - Fel control: electric fuel pump
  - Power: 95 PS (70 kW; 94 hp) at 5,300 rpm
  - Torque: 13.5 kg⋅m (132 N⋅m; 98 lb⋅ft) at 3,000 rpm
  - Oil Capacity: 3.5 L (3.7 US qt)
- EP
  - 1980-1985 Honda Quintet/Quint (Japan)
  - 1980-1982 Honda Accord/Vigor

== ER ==
The long-stroke ER four-cylinder engine has five crankshaft bearings and an overhead camshaft, driven by a cogged belt.

- It was sold as a 12-valve CVCC-II in Japan and as a simple eight-valve unit in Europe and Asia,
- It was only used in the AA/VF/FA series City/Jazz, from 1981 until 1986.
- It was available as a normally aspirated carburated version or with Honda's own PGM-FI fuel injection as one of a very few turbocharged engines built by Honda until the 21st century.
- The Japanese market CVCC engine was also known as COMBAX, an acronym of COMpact Blazing-combustion AXiom. The E-series were tuned for economy, with higher gearing and later on with computer-controlled variable lean burn.
- As of March 1985, the naturally aspirated ER engines gained composite conrods (a world first in a production car), lighter and stronger these helped further reduce fuel consumption.

The lower powered engines in the commercial "City Pro" series had a lower compression, a distributor rather than the distributorless coil pack setup found in the passenger cars, and a manual choke. JIS outputs below are gross figures, while DIN outputs are net.

Engine type	Inline four, SOHC CVCC-II 12-valve			
Displacement	1.2 L; 75.1 cu in (1,231 cc)			
Bore x stroke	66 mm × 90 mm (2.60 in × 3.54 in)			
Fuel type	Leaded (export) or unleaded (domestic)			
power	torque	fuel feed	compression	notes
45 PS (33 kW; 44 hp) DIN at 4500 rpm	82 N⋅m; 61 lb⋅ft (8.4 kg⋅m) at 2500 rpm	1 bbl carburetor	10.2:1 (normal)	European market
56 PS (41 kW; 55 hp) DIN at 5000 rpm	9.5 kg⋅m (93 N⋅m; 69 lb⋅ft) at 3500 rpm	2 bbl carburetor, manual choke	10.2:1 (super)	European market (ER1 & ER4 engine)
61 PS (45 kW; 60 hp) JIS at 5000 rpm	9.8 kg⋅m (96 N⋅m; 71 lb⋅ft) at 3000 rpm	2 bbl carburetor	9.0:1 (unleaded)	Pro T, Pro F
63 PS (46 kW; 62 hp) JIS at 5000 rpm	10 kg⋅m (98 N⋅m; 72 lb⋅ft) at 3000 rpm	2 bbl carburetor	10.0:1 (unleaded)	E-series, U, R (AT), Cabriolet (AT)
67 PS (49 kW; 66 hp) JIS at 5000 rpm	10 kg⋅m (98 N⋅m; 72 lb⋅ft) at 3500 rpm	2 bbl carburetor	10.0:1 (unleaded)	R and Cabriolet with MT
100 PS (74 kW; 99 hp) JIS at 5500 rpm	15 kg⋅m (147 N⋅m; 108 lb⋅ft) at 3000 rpm	FI, turbo	7.5:1 (unleaded)	City Turbo
110 PS (81 kW; 108 hp) JIS at 5500 rpm	16.3 kg⋅m (160 N⋅m; 118 lb⋅ft) at 3000 rpm	FI, turbo + intercooler	7.6:1 (unleaded)	Turbo II "Bulldog"

Carburetor versions used either a single or 2bbl downdraft Keihin. The turbocharger in the Turbo and Turbo II was developed together with IHI, the Turbo II being equipped with an intercooler and a computer-controlled wastegate.

ER1-4 Honda City

== ES ==
The ES displaced 1.8 L; 111.6 cu in (1,829 cc). All ES engines were SOHC 12-valve engines. The ES1 used dual sidedraft carburetors to produce 102 PS (75 kW; 101 hp) at 5500 rpm and 14.4 kg⋅m (141 N⋅m; 104 lb⋅ft) at 4000 rpm. The ES2 replaced this with a standard 3 barrel carburetor for 87 PS (64 kW; 86 hp) at 5800 rpm and 13.7 kg⋅m (134 N⋅m; 99 lb⋅ft) at 3500 rpm. Finally, the ES3 used PGM-FI for 102 PS (75 kW; 101 hp) at 5800 rpm and 14.9 kg⋅m (146 N⋅m; 108 lb⋅ft) at 2500 rpm.

- ES1
  - 1983-1984 Honda Prelude
- ES2
  - 1984-1985 Honda Accord
- ES3
  - 1985- Honda Accord SE-i
  - 1981-1985 Honda Vigor VTL-i, VT-i, TT-i (Japan)

== ET ==
The ET displaced 1.8 L; 111.6 cu in (1,829 cc) and was an SOHC 12-valve engine. ET1 had a single, downdraft carb with 4-1 exhaust manifold. The ET2 with dual sidedraft carburetors and 4-2-1 exhaust manifold produced 100 PS (74 kW; 99 hp) at 5,500 rpm and 14.4 kg⋅m (141 N⋅m; 104 lb⋅ft) at 4,000 rpm. JDM versions included a triple-barrel carburetted version for the Accord (110 PS or 81 kW or 108 hp at 5,800 rpm) and one with Honda PGM-FI which produced 130 PS (96 kW; 128 hp) at 5,800 rpm.

- ET
  - 1983-1985 Honda Accord
  - 1983-1987 Honda Prelude

== EV ==
The EV displaced 1.3 L; 81.9 cu in (1,342 cc) 74mm bore, 78mm stroke and was an SOHC 12-valve design. 3 barrel carburetors produced 61 PS (45 kW; 60 hp) at 5,500 rpm and 10.1 kg⋅m (99 N⋅m; 73 lb⋅ft) at 3,500 rpm for the US market. The JDM version, featuring 12 valves and auxiliary CVCC valves, produced 80 PS (59 kW; 79 hp) at 6,000 rpm and 11.3 kg⋅m (111 N⋅m; 82 lb⋅ft) at 3,500 rpm. It was available in all bodystyles of the third generation Honda Civic.

- EV1
  - 1983-1986 Honda Civic
  - 1983-1986 Honda CRX
- EV2
  - 1984-1990 Rover 213 71 PS (52 kW; 70 hp)
  - 1983-1986 Honda Civic

== EW ==
The final E-family engine was the EW, presented along with the all new third generation Honda Civic in September 1983. Displacing 1.5 L; 90.8 cu in (1,488 cc), the EWs were SOHC 12-valve engines. Early 3 barrel EW1s produced from 58 to 76 hp (43 to 57 kW) and 11 to 11.6 kg⋅m (108 to 114 N⋅m; 80 to 84 lb⋅ft). The fuel injected EW3 and EW4 produced 92 PS (68 kW; 91 hp) at 5,500 rpm and 12.8 kg⋅m (126 N⋅m; 93 lb⋅ft) at 4,500 rpm. The "EW" name was replaced by the Honda D15 series, with the EW (1, 2, 3, 4, and 5) renamed to D15A (1, 2, 3, 4, and 5) in 1987. It also received a new engine stamp placement on the front of the engine like the "modern D series" (1988+).

- EW1
  - 1983-1985 Honda Civic/CRX DX (unlabeled)
  - 1983-1986 Honda Civic
  - 1983-1986 Honda Shuttle
- EW2
  - 1983-1987 Honda Civic non-CVCC (CDM)
- EW3
  - 1985- Honda Civic/CRX Si non-CVCC
- EW4
  - 1985-1986 Honda CRX Si non-CVCC
  - 1986 Honda Civic Si non-CVCC
- EW5
  - similar to the EW1, Fuel injected CVCC 12-Valve 4 Aux valves. A third throttle plate in the throttle body supplied intake air to a 5th injector which powered the CVCC ports, The rated power is different between the Civic and the CR-X: the Civic makes 100 PS (74 kW; 99 hp) at 5800 rpm and 13.2 kg⋅m (129 N⋅m; 95 lb⋅ft) torque at 4000 rpm, the CR-X made 110 PS (81 kW; 108 hp) at 5800 rpm and 13.8 kg⋅m (135 N⋅m; 100 lb⋅ft) torque at 4500 rpm. Differences in power are largely down to a more efficient exhaust system on the CR-X it used a factory cast iron 4-2-1 extractor went through a catalytic converter further down the exhaust system and had twin exit tail pipes. The Civic had a short 4-1 design into a catalytic converter and single pipe exit. There was a revised intake manifold for vehicles produced in 1986 and 1987. The EW5 was only available in Japan. It came in the following models: CR-X 1.5i, Civic 25i Hatchback, Ballade CRi Sedan.

== ZA ==
The ZA1 and ZA2 are anomalously named, but closely related to the 1.3-litre EV. With a shorter stroke but the same bore 74 mm × 69 mm (2.91 in × 2.72 in), this 1.2 L; 72.4 cu in (1,187 cc) shared most of the EV's characteristics. It was only sold in the third generation Civic in European and various smaller markets where the taxation structure suited this version. The high octane version produces 62 PS (46 kW; 61 hp) at 6000 rpm and 9.0 kg⋅m (88 N⋅m; 65 lb⋅ft) at 4000 rpm. There was also a low-octane model, producing 55 PS (40 kW; 54 hp) at 6000 rpm.

- 1984-1987 Honda Civic hatchback (AL)
- 1984-1987 Honda Civic saloon (AM)

== See also ==
- List of Honda engines
