= Quintette, California =

Unincorporated community in California, United States

Quintette
- Unincorporated community
- Location in California Quintette (the United States)
- Coordinates: 38°54′54″N 120°41′14″W
- Country: United States
- State: California
- County: El Dorado
- Elevation: 4,049 ft (1,234 m)

Quintette is an unincorporated community in El Dorado County, California, United States. It is located 12 miles (19 km) north-northwest of Pollock Pines, at an elevation of 4049 feet (1234 m).

A post office operated at Quintette from 1903 to 1912, with a move in 1906.
