= Honda Quint =

Honda Quint series SU
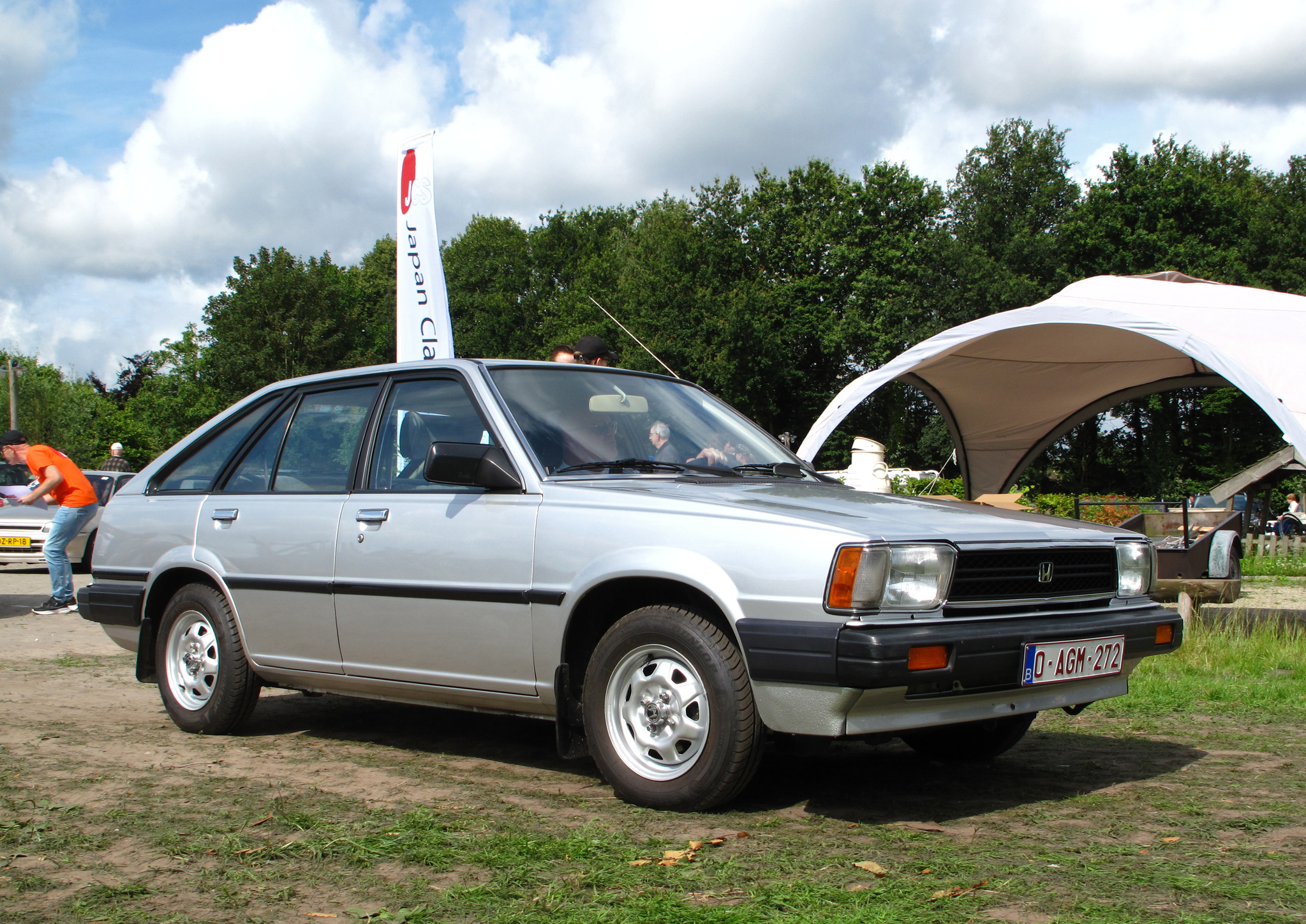
- Honda Quintet 1.6

Overview
- Manufacturer: Honda Motor Company
- Also called: Honda Quintet; Rover Quintet (Australia)
- Production: 1980–1985
- Assembly: Japan: Suzuka, Mie (Suzuka Plant)

Body and chassis
- Body style: 5-door liftback
- Related: Honda Civic; Honda Ballade

Powertrain
- Engine: 1.6 L EP type CVCC I4
- Transmission: 5-speed manual 3-speed Hondamatic

Dimensions
- Wheelbase: 2,360 mm (92.9 in)
- Length: 4,110 mm (161.8 in)
- Width: 1,615 mm (63.6 in)
- Height: 1,355 mm (53.3 in)
- Curb weight: 900 kg (1,984 lb)

Chronology
- Successor: Honda Integra; Honda Concerto

The Honda Quint is a subcompact car manufactured by Honda in Japan from 1980 until 1985. It was introduced in February 1980 in Japan as a five-door liftback version of the Honda Civic, being more upscale than the Civic, and was sold at the Honda Verno sales channel in Japan. The Quint was made available to export markets including Europe and Southeast Asia in 1981, with the export name being Honda Quintet. Beginning in 1983, this model was also sold in Australia as the Rover Quintet. The Quint was succeeded by the Honda Quint Integra in 1985.

The car came with a 1,602 cc four-cylinder EP engine which develops 80 PS (79 bhp; 59 kW) and 126.5 N⋅m (93 lb⋅ft) of torque. This engine was coupled with a five-speed manual transmission or an optional two-speed semi-automatic with overdrive. A three-speed version of the semi-auto Hondamatic replaced this during 1982. Speed sensitive power steering (not on the base model) and fully independent suspension with MacPherson struts and front and rear anti-roll bars were also featured. The top models had air conditioning, central locking, electric windows, and electric sunroof. Japanese specified versions claim 90 PS (89 bhp; 66 kW) because it is rated using Japanese Industrial Standards (JIS).

== Australia ==
Jaguar Rover Australia retailed the Honda Quint in Australia under the "Rover Quintet" name from 1983 through to 1985. Manufactured in Japan by Honda, the Quintet was the first Honda to carry the Rover badge. As the Rover Quintet, the interior received wood trim, as typified in the later Honda-based Rovers made in Britain, and the seats were trimmed in Moquette cloth. A Pioneer stereo radio cassette was standard. The Rover Quintet was replaced by the Rover 416i, a rebadged version of the Honda Integra.

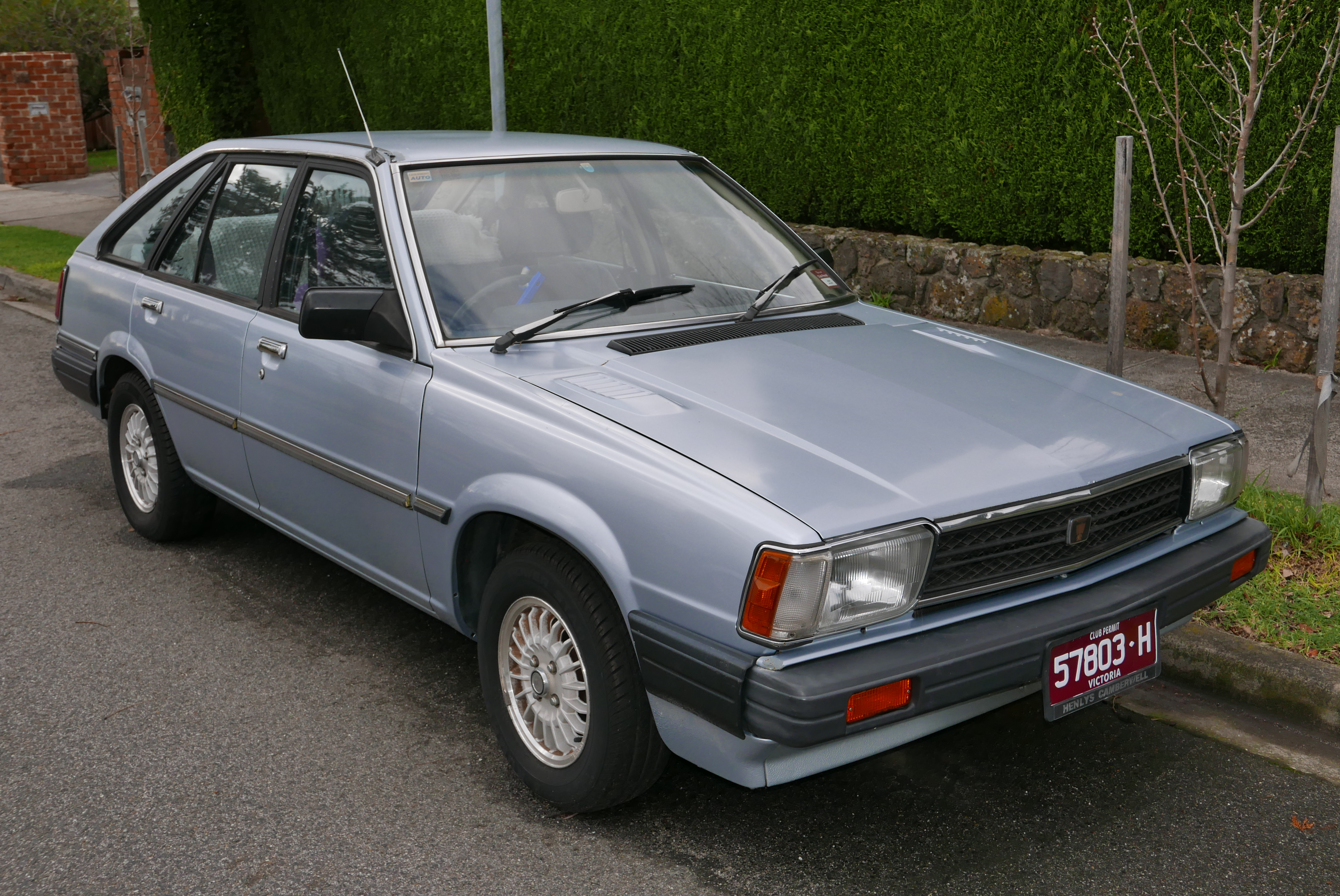
Rover Quintet (Australian market)

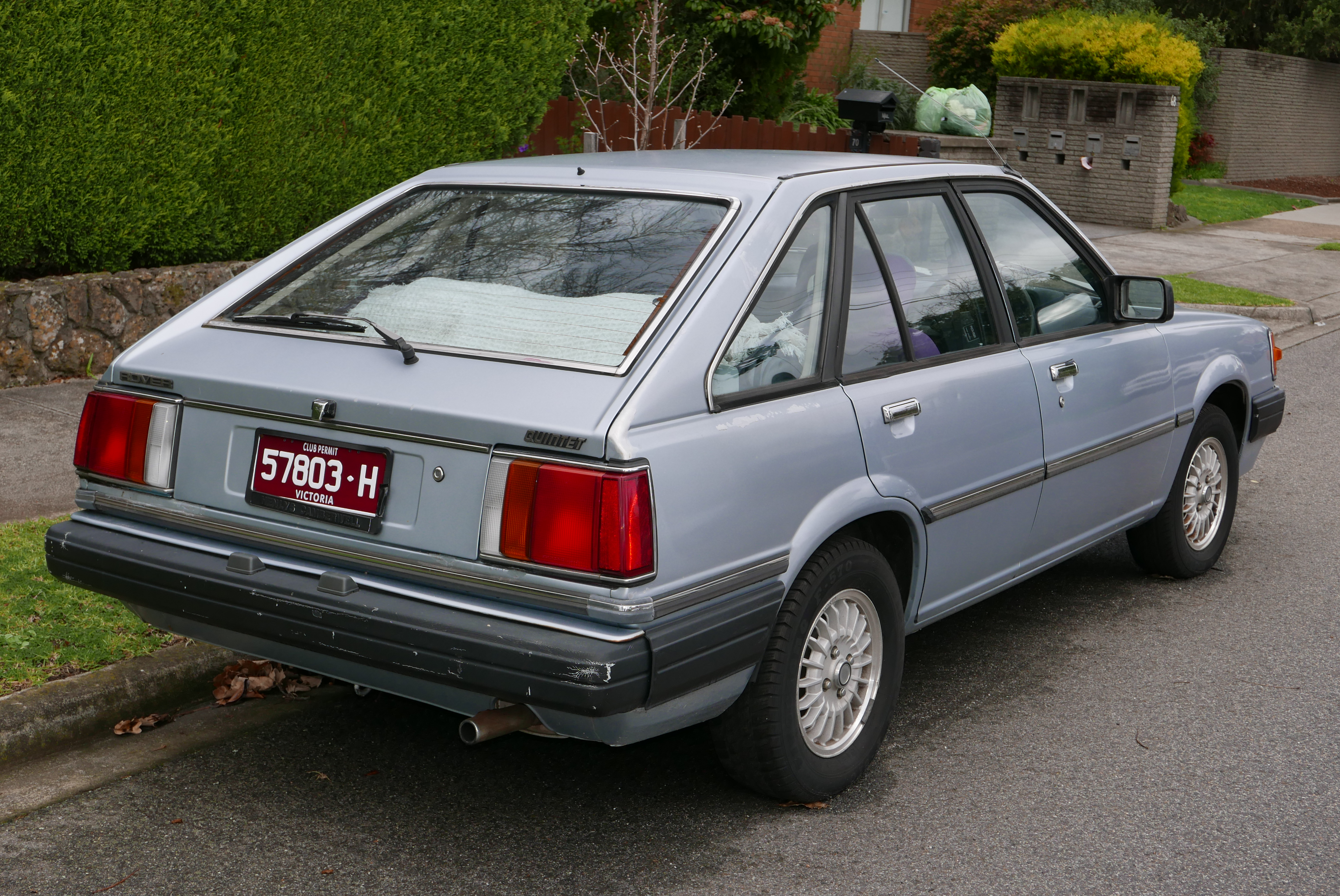
Rover Quintet (Australia)
