= Rover 200 / 25 =

Motor vehicle

Rover 200 Series Rover 25
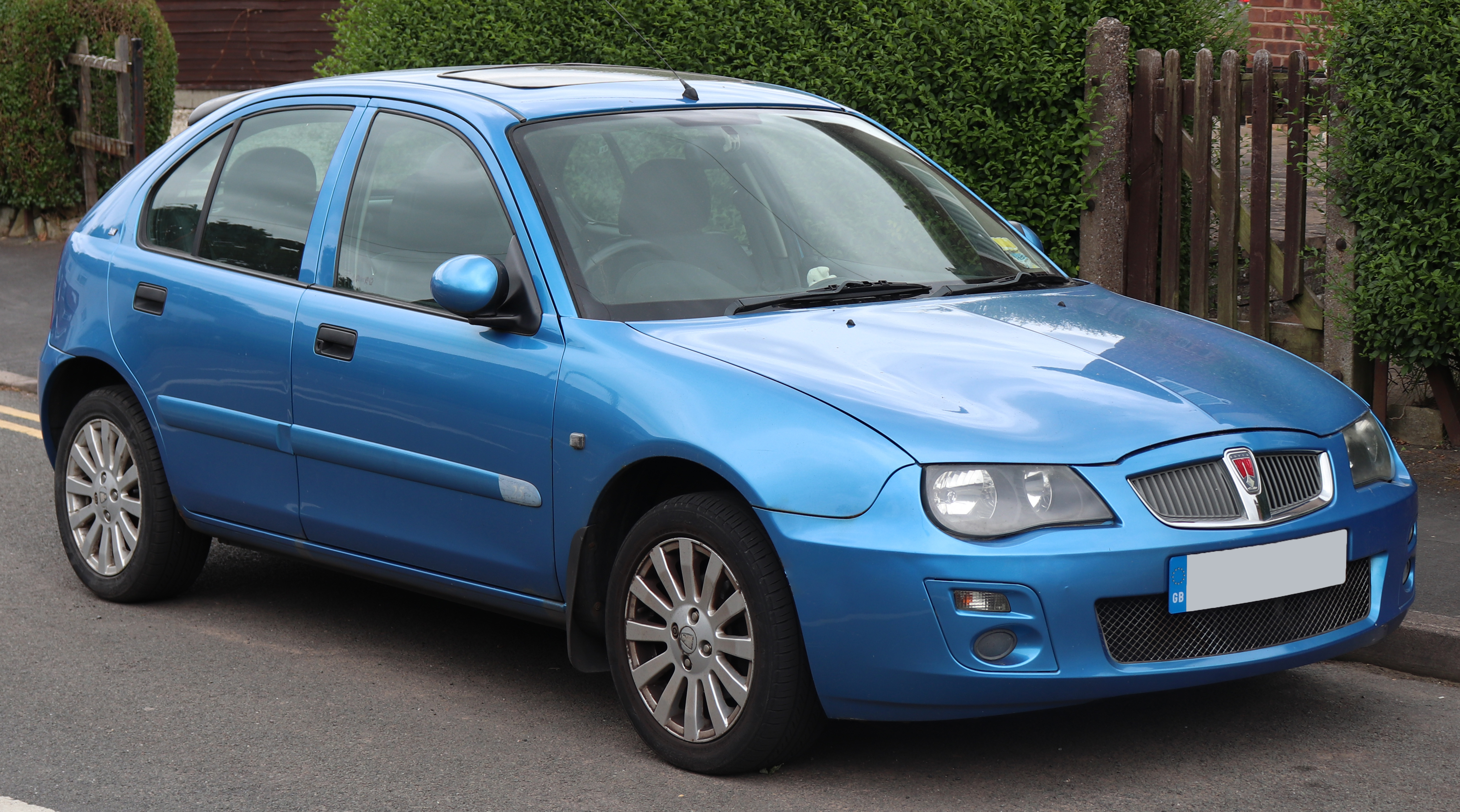
- Rover 25

Overview
- Manufacturer: British Leyland (1984–1988); Rover Group (1988–2000); MG Rover (2000–2005)
- Production: 1984–2005: (China: 2008–2011); 1984–1989 (Rover 200 MkI); 1989–1995 (Rover 200 MkII); 1995–1999 (Rover 200 MkIII); 1999–2004 (Rover 25 MkI); 2004–2005 (Rover 25 MkII); 2003–2005 (Rover Streetwise); 2008–2011 (MG 3 SW) (China)
- Assembly: United Kingdom: Longbridge, Birmingham

Body and chassis
- Class: Small family car (C) (1984–1999); Supermini (B) (1999–2005)
- Layout: Front-engine, front-wheel-drive

Chronology
- Predecessor: Triumph Acclaim; Austin Maestro (for MkII); Austin Metro (for MkIII)
- Successor: Rover 400 HH-R (for MkII); MG 5 (for Rover 25); MG 3 (for MG)

The Rover 200 Series, and later the Rover 25, are a series of small family cars that were produced at the Longbridge factory by former British manufacturer Rover from 1984 until 2005 over four distinct generations.

The Rover 200 was conceived in partnership with Honda originally as a four-door saloon car based on the Honda Ballade. The second generation introduced in 1989 was made in three or five-door hatchback forms, as well a coupé and cabriolet (in relatively small numbers). Its sister model, the Honda Concerto was built on the same production line.

The third generation Rover 200 was introduced in 1995 and was developed independently by Rover on the platform of its predecessor. This car was downsized and was available as a three or five-door hatchback. The model was facelifted in 1999 and renamed as the Rover 25, with a higher performance variant sold as the MG ZR with mechanical changes to the suspension. Production ceased in 2005 when MG Rover went into administration.

== Rover 200 (SD3; 1984–1989) ==
Rover 200 (SD3)
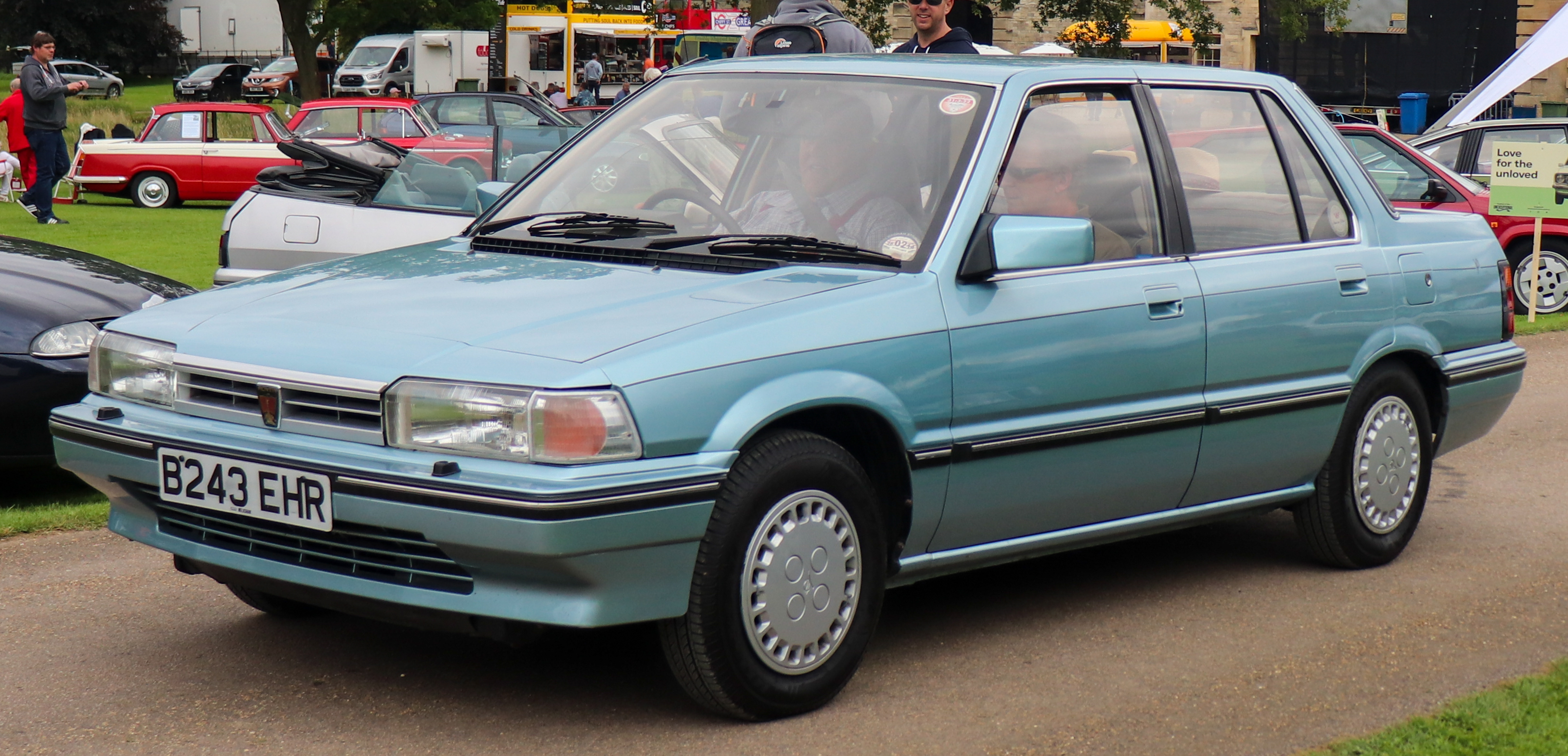
- Rover 213 1.3

Overview
- Production: 1984–1989

Body and chassis
- Body style: 4-door saloon
- Related: Honda Ballade

Powertrain
- Engine: 1.3 L Honda EV2 I4; 1.6 L S-series I4
- Transmission: 3-speed Honda automatic 4-speed ZF automatic 5-speed Honda manual

Dimensions
- Wheelbase: 2,450 mm (96.5 in)
- Length: 4,156 mm (163.6 in)
- Width: 1,623 mm (63.9 in)
- Height: 1,378 mm (54.3 in)

The original Rover 200 (sometimes referred to by the codename SD3) was the replacement for the earlier Triumph Acclaim, and was the second product of the alliance between British Leyland (BL) and Honda. Only available as a four-door saloon, the 200 series was intended to be more upmarket than the company's Maestro and Montego models, which the 200 Series came in between in terms of size. It was launched on 19 June 1984, at which time there was still a high demand for small family saloons, with many manufacturers selling this type of car under a different nameplate to similar-sized hatchbacks. For example, Ford was selling the saloon version of the Escort as the Orion, the saloon version of the Volkswagen Golf was called the Jetta, and Vauxhall soon launched an Astra-based saloon called the Belmont. The Rover 200 Series, however, was not based on a hatchback.

Earlier in 1984, Austin Rover had confirmed that the successor to the Acclaim would be badged as a Rover rather than a Triumph – a decision which signalled the end for the Triumph brand. The move was seen as controversial as the Rover brand had long been associated with large executive saloons as well as the Land Rover and Range Rover, and there were fears that its application to a small Japanese-derived compact would devalue the Rover name.

Essentially, the 200 series was a British-built Honda Ballade, the original design of which had been collaborated upon by both companies. Engines employed were either the Honda Civic derived E series 'EV2' 71 PS (52 kW; 70 bhp) 1.3-litre 12-valve engine, or British Leyland's own S-series engine in 1.6-litre format (both in 86 PS (63 kW; 85 bhp) carburettor and 103 PS (76 kW; 102 bhp) Lucas EFi form). The resulting cars were badged as either Rover 213 or Rover 216.

The 213 used either a Honda five-speed manual gearbox or a Honda three-speed automatic transmission. The British-engined 216 also employed a Honda five-speed manual gearbox, unlike the S-Series engine when fitted in the Maestro and Montego. There was also the option of a German ZF four-speed automatic on some 216 models as well.

The Honda-badged version was the first Honda car to be built in the United Kingdom (the Honda equivalent of the 200 Series' predecessor, the Triumph Acclaim, was never sold in the UK). Ballade bodyshells, and later complete cars, were made in the Longbridge plant alongside the Rover equivalent, with the Ballade models then going to Honda's new Swindon plant for quality-control checks.

Although production ceased in late 1989, stocks of the car continued to be available until early 1990, when it was replaced by the Rover 400.

This model of car (SD3 saloon version; 216S in the first series, then replaced by a 216SE EFi model) is well known as Richard and Hyacinth Bucket's car in the BBC Television sitcom Keeping Up Appearances (1990–1995).

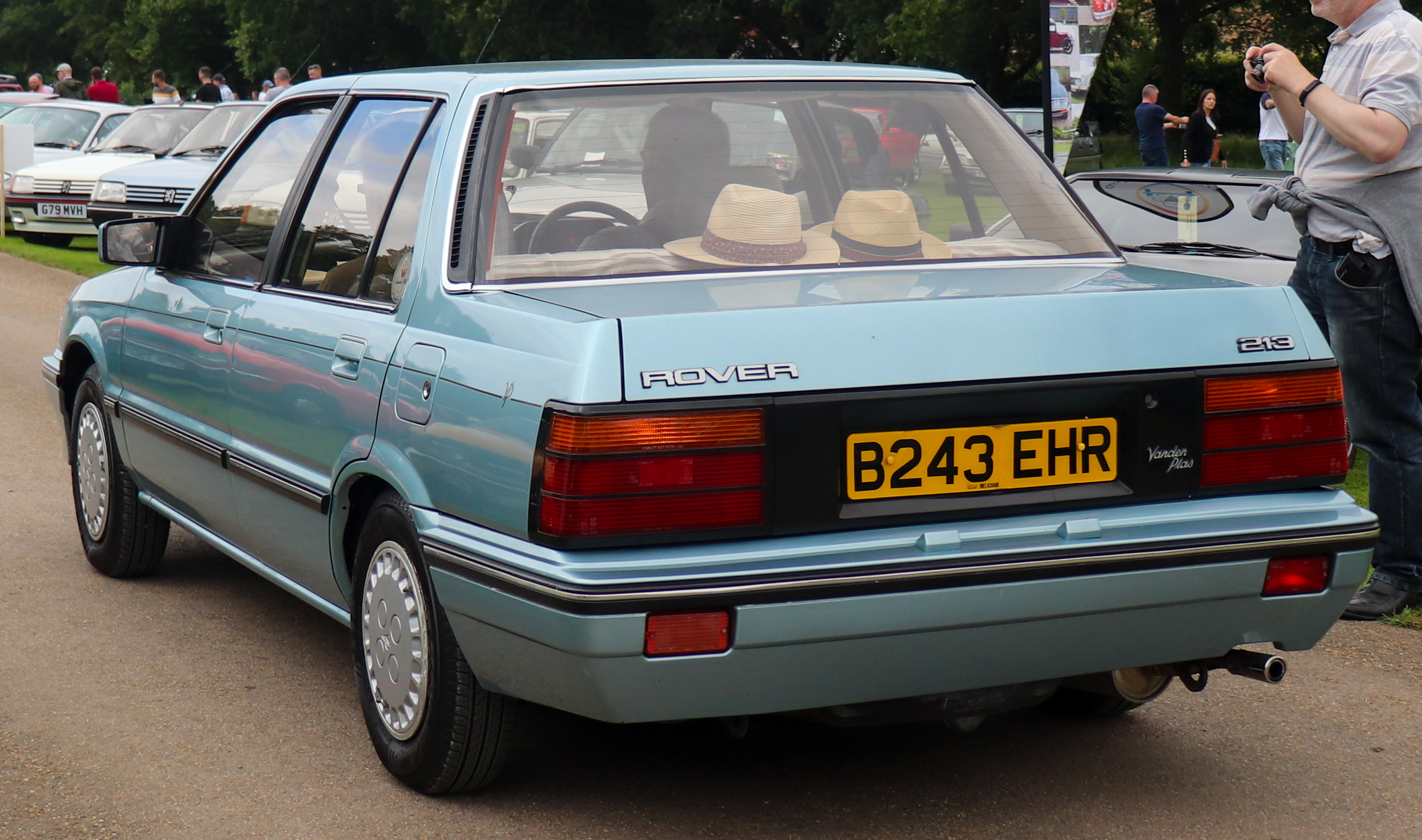
Rover 213 1.3 (rear view)

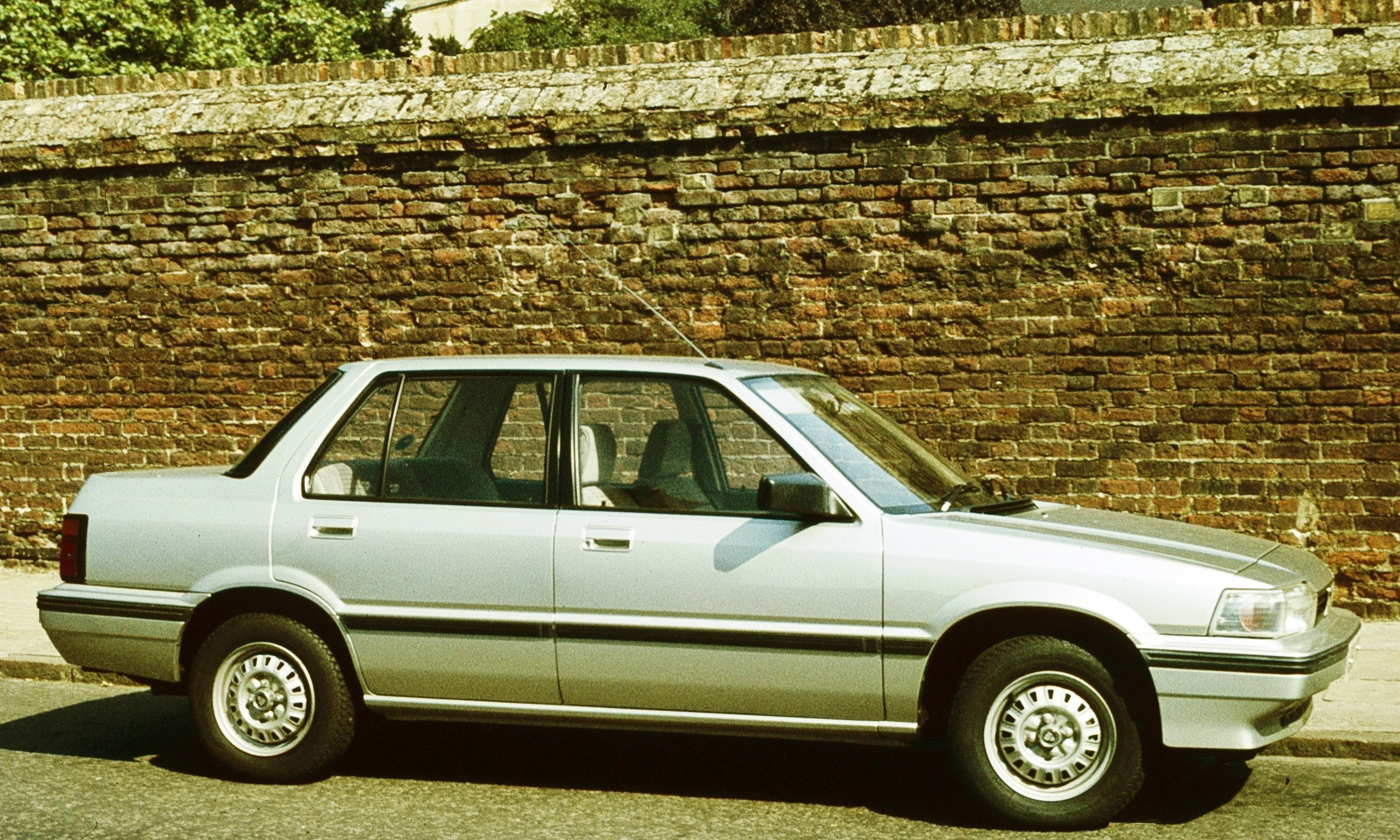
Rover 213 side profile

== Rover 200 (R8; 1989–1995) ==
Rover 200 (R8)
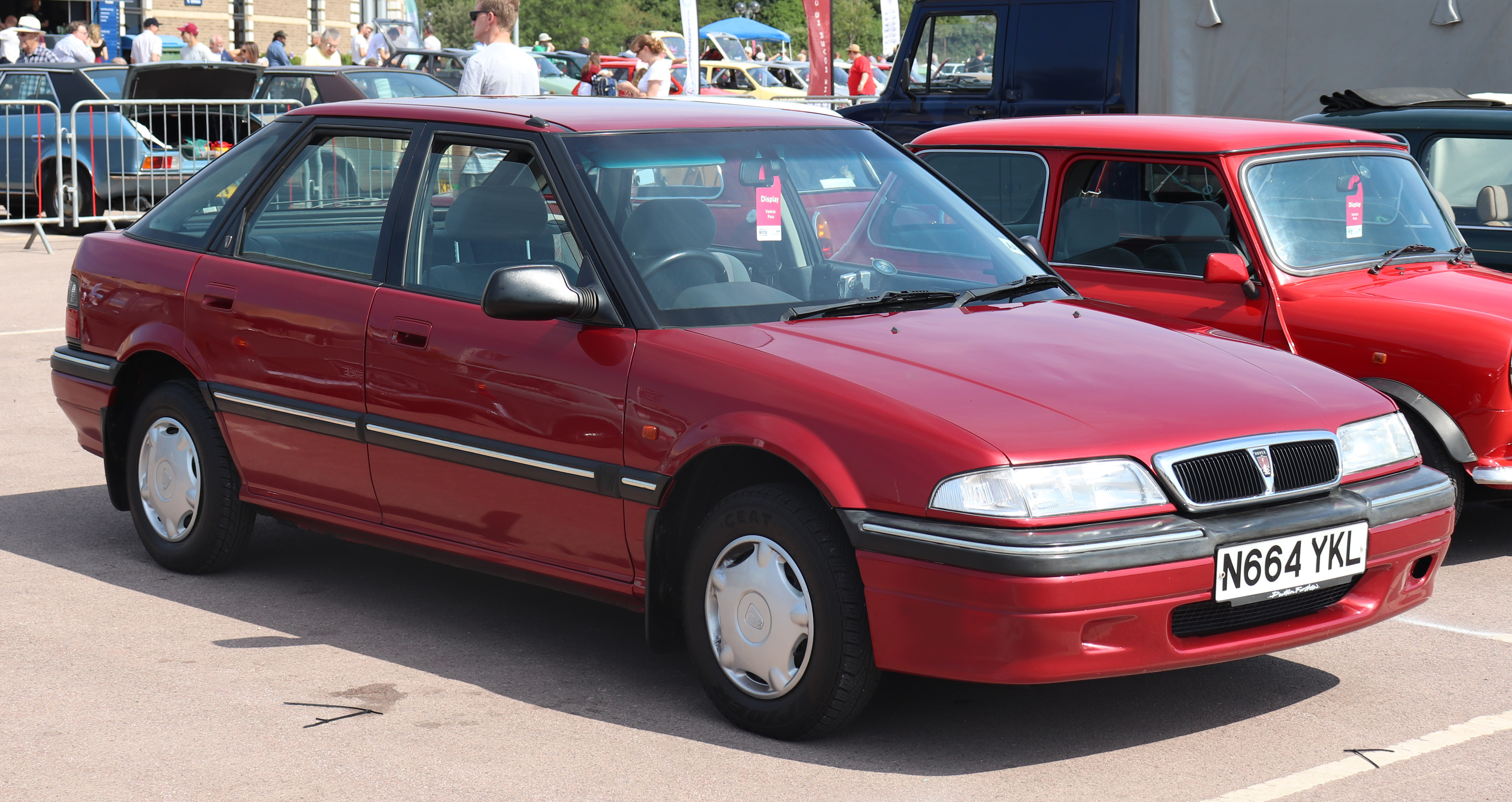
- Rover 200 Series Mk2

Overview
- Production: 1989–1995
- Designer: Roy Axe

Body and chassis
- Body style: 3/5-door hatchback; 2-door coupé; 2-door cabriolet
- Related: Honda Concerto; Rover 200 Coupé; Rover 400 (R8)

Powertrain
- Engine: petrol: 1.4 L K-series I4; 1.6 L K-series I4; 1.6 L Honda D16A6 I4; 1.6 L Honda D16A8 DOHC I4; 2.0 L M-series I4; 2.0 L T-series I4; 2.0 L T-series turbo I4; diesel: 1.8 L PSA XUD7TE turbo I4; 1.9 L PSA XUD9A I4

Dimensions
- Wheelbase: 2,550 mm (100.4 in)
- Length: 4,220 mm (166.1 in) (hatchback, cabriolet); 4,270 mm (168.1 in) (coupé)
- Width: 1,680 mm (66.1 in)
- Height: 1,400 mm (55.1 in) (hatchback); 1,390 mm (54.7 in) (cabriolet); 1,370 mm (53.9 in) (coupé)

The R8 Rover 200, sometimes referred to as the Mk 2 Rover 200, was launched on 11 October 1989. Unlike the Mk 1, Ballade-based, 200, this model was a five-door hatchback designed to replace the Maestro while the saloon variant, called the 400 Series, was effectively the replacement for the previous Rover 200 Series when it was launched in April 1990. The 400 had a different name in an effort to position it slightly upmarket from the hatchback version, analogous to the Ford Orion, the saloon version of the Ford Escort. Once again, the model was designed in collaboration with Honda, who produced the new designed-for-Europe Concerto model, and the two models shared production lines at Rover's Longbridge factory. The 200 and Concerto itself were based on the 4th generation Civic (EC), of which the 3-door hatchback, coupé CRX and saloon versions were sold in the United Kingdom.

The R8 200 was the first car to be introduced by the newly privatised Rover Group. The Maestro continued alongside the Rover 200 hatchback as a budget option until production finished in December 1994.

In the autumn of 1992, the 200 received a mild facelift, featuring redesigned front indicator lights, but unlike its 400 sibling, which was also facelifted at the same time, the car did not feature a new grille (which Rover reintroduced on the 1992 R17 facelift of the Rover 800) or new body coloured bumpers. This led to some owners retro-fitting the 400's new grille on to the 200. In 1993 Rover finally added the new grille and body coloured bumpers to the 200 range.

=== Body styles ===
The 200 also spawned three-door hatchback, coupé and convertible versions, while the 400 eventually spawned an estate version, referred to as the Tourer. These latter variants were solely Rover designed and produced products, with no Honda Concerto versions available. Initial plans to sell the coupe version under the MG marque were abandoned, although the 5-door hatchback was the most popular and common version.

The 4-seat Cabriolet (codenamed Tracer) and the Coupé (codenamed Tomcat) were developed concurrently and were based on the 3-door understructure. Rover worked closely with Pininfarina to develop the hood mechanism of the Cabriolet, with the car being announced in spring 1992.

The Coupé was also launched in autumn 1992 and featured an entry-level 1.6 SOHC, and a normally aspirated or turbocharged 2.0-litre T-series. In several markets, where engine taxation was based on displacement, the 1.6 SOHC and the normally aspirated 2.0 were replaced with a single, 1.6 DOHC–engined version. The 1.6 was also available with a 4-speed automatic gearbox.

The 220 Turbo was the fastest Rover to be produced at the time, with a top speed of more than 150mph. Rover had originally considered marketing the coupe version of the car as an MG, but eventually decided to include it as part of the Rover 200 range. The addition of more powerful versions of the Rover 200 Series, including the GTi models, saw the demise of the high performance MG Maestro 2.0 EFi and Turbo models in 1991.

As publicity for the Coupé's launch, a group of volunteer Rover employees prepared two special Land Speed Record cars and after an aborted run in August, broke 37 UK Land Speed Records on 26/27 September 1992 at the Millbrook Proving Ground, Bedfordshire. These included a flying 5 km average speed of 156 mph (251 km/h) and a 24-hour average speed of 138 mph (222 km/h). 36 of these records remain unbroken. The record breaking was referred to as "The Tomcat Affair", in reference to the project's development codename.

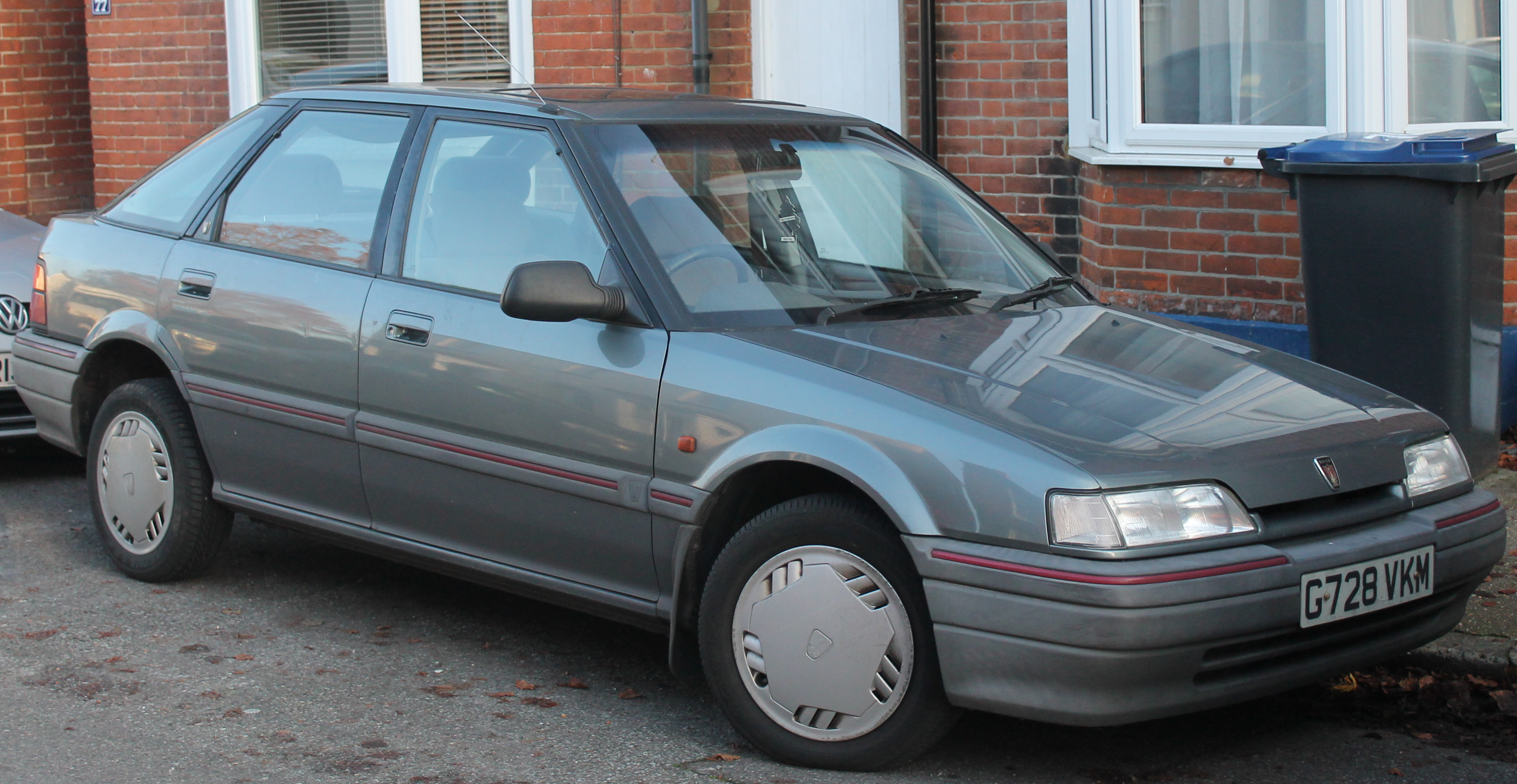
Pre-facelift Rover 216 GSi (UK)

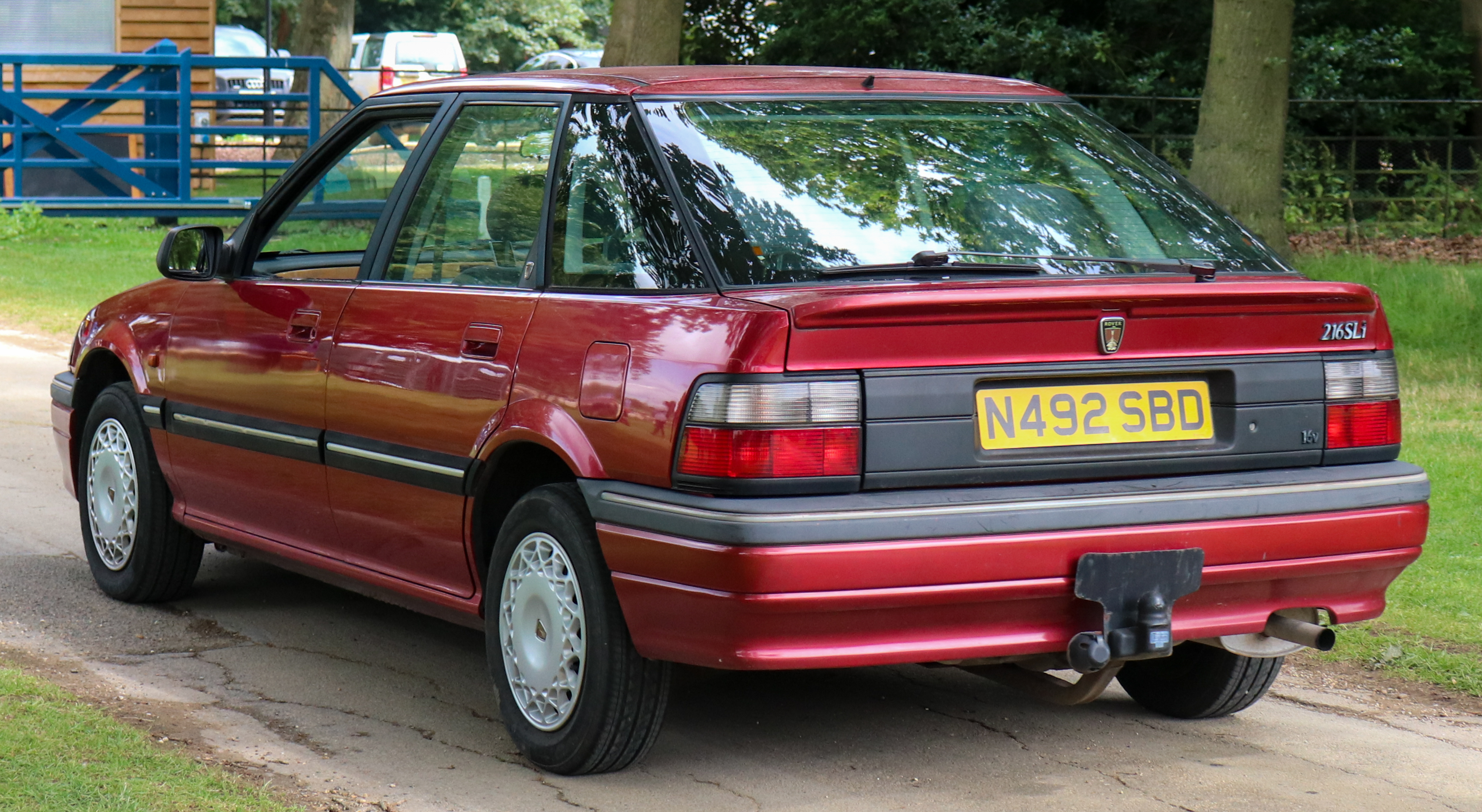
Post-facelift Rover 200 Series Mk2 (rear view)

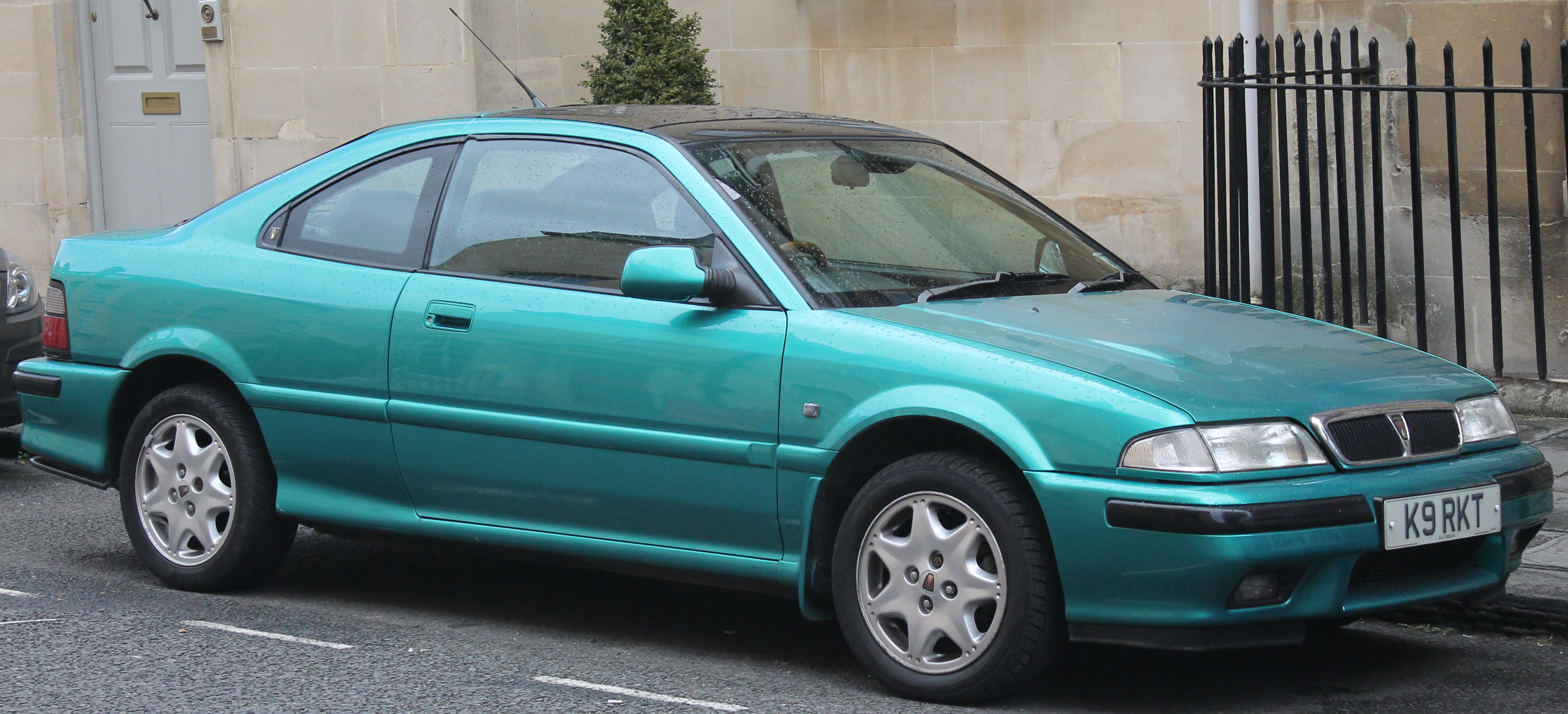
Rover 200 Coupé

=== Engines ===
The 200 also saw the introduction of Rover's brand-new K-series family of engines (appearing in 1.4 L (1396 cc) twin-cam 16-valve form). The 1.6 L (1590 cc) version used either a Honda D16A6 SOHC or D16A8 DOHC powerplant, while the 2.0 L M-series unit from the 800-series followed soon afterwards (1991) in the sportier versions. Later versions used the Rover T-series engine, with limited-run turbocharged Rover 220s in GTi and GSi-Turbo trims, boasting a power output of 200 PS (147 kW; 197 bhp) as standard. The Rover-engined models drove the front wheels via jointly developed Peugeot/Rover R65 gearboxes (1.4-litre) and Rover PG-1 gearboxes for the 1.6- and 2.0-litre versions. From December 1990, the carburettor-engine 214S (with a 1.4 engine from the Metro) was added to the range, but discontinued within two years due to EEC emissions requirements. Its gap was filled by the 214i, which featured the 1.4 K-series unit from the 214Si and 214SLi.

Also available were two PSA (non-electronically controlled Lucas CAV injection pumps) Indirect injection diesel engines, with the choice of naturally aspirated 1.9-litre XUD9 or turbocharged 1.8 XUD7T engines. They were class leaders for refinement in Peugeot and Citroën installations, but less refined in the Rovers. These engines were installed instead of the non-electronically controlled Bosch HPVE Direct Injection Rover MDi / Perkins Prima used in the Austin Maestro and Montego, because that engine with its noisy combustion but lower fuel consumption, was deemed too unrefined for the new models.

In France, Italy, and Portugal, where demand for diesel cars was high, Honda offered a rebadged 200 Turbodiesel called the Concerto TD. Despite the Concerto name, this model retained the 200's exterior lighting, suspension, and trim.

=== Reception ===
On its launch, the R8 200 was one of the few new designs in the small family car class. For instance, Ford's Escort had been around since 1980, (with a facelift in early 1986) and Vauxhall's Astra was unchanged from its 1984 launch. Indeed, the only major European competitors that had been around for less than five years were the Peugeot 309, Renault 19 and Fiat Tipo. However, the Escort, Astra and Golf had all been replaced by the start of 1992.

On average, up to 110,000 Rover 200 and 400 (R8) models were sold each year, more than half being sold in Britain. The 214 won What Car?'s 1990 "Car of the Year", but was not considered for the 1990 European Car of the Year award as it was not yet available on the required number of European markets for it to be shortlisted.

In June 2019, Practical Classics wrote: 'The R8 was very much the high-water mark for Rover in their Honda years.'

== Rover 200 (R3; 1995–1999) ==
Rover 200 (R3)
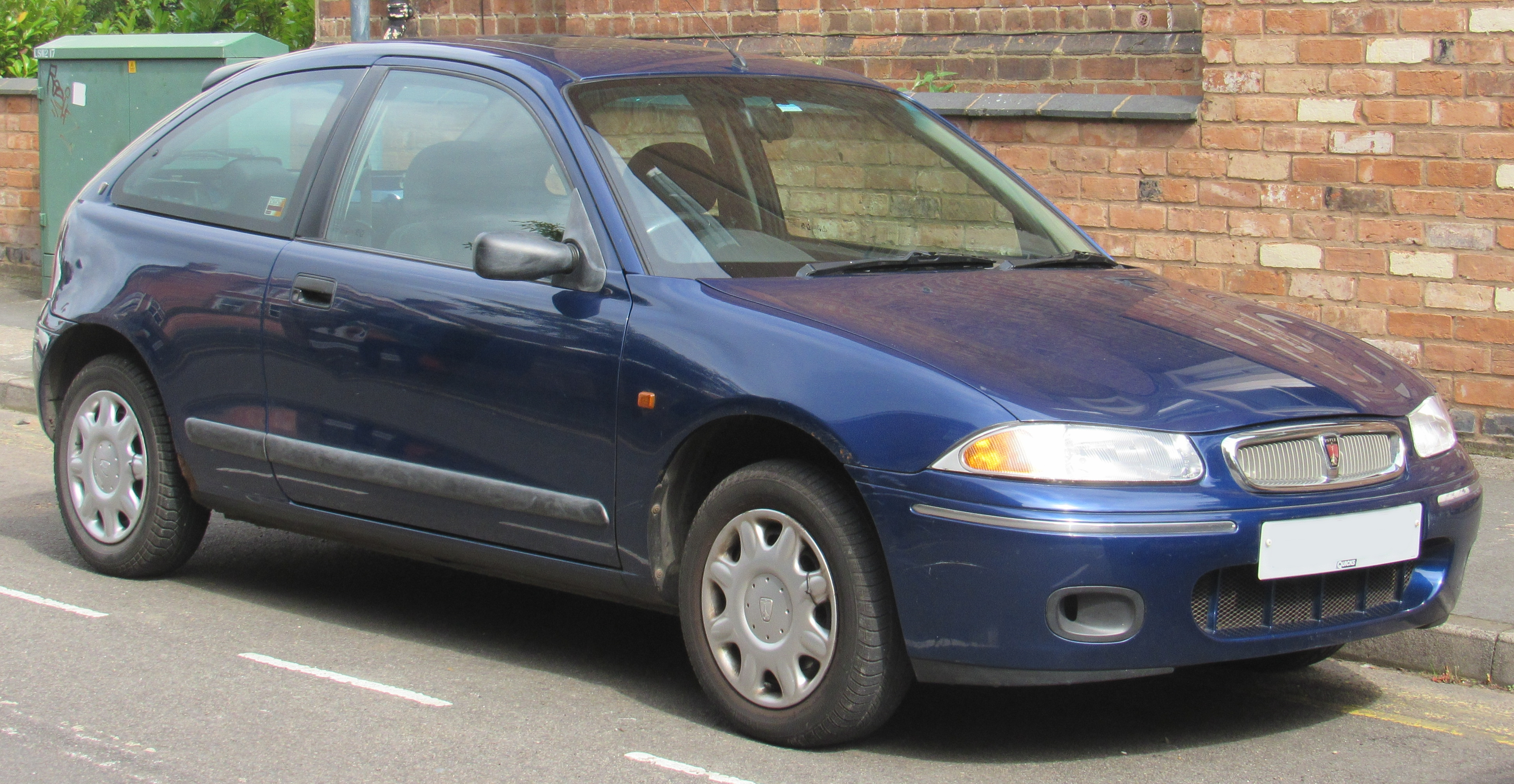

Overview
- Production: 1995–1999

Body and chassis
- Body style: 3-door hatchback 5-door hatchback
- Related: Rover 400 (HH-R)

Powertrain
- Engine: petrol: 1.1 L K-series I4; 1.4 L K-series I4; 1.6 L K-series I4; 1.8 L K-series I4; 1.8 L K-series VVC I4; diesel: 2.0 L L-series turbo I4
- Transmission: 4-speed automatic 5-speed manual CVT

Dimensions
- Wheelbase: 2,500 mm (98.4 in)
- Length: 3,970 mm (156.3 in)
- Width: 1,690 mm (66.5 in)
- Height: 1,420 mm (55.9 in)

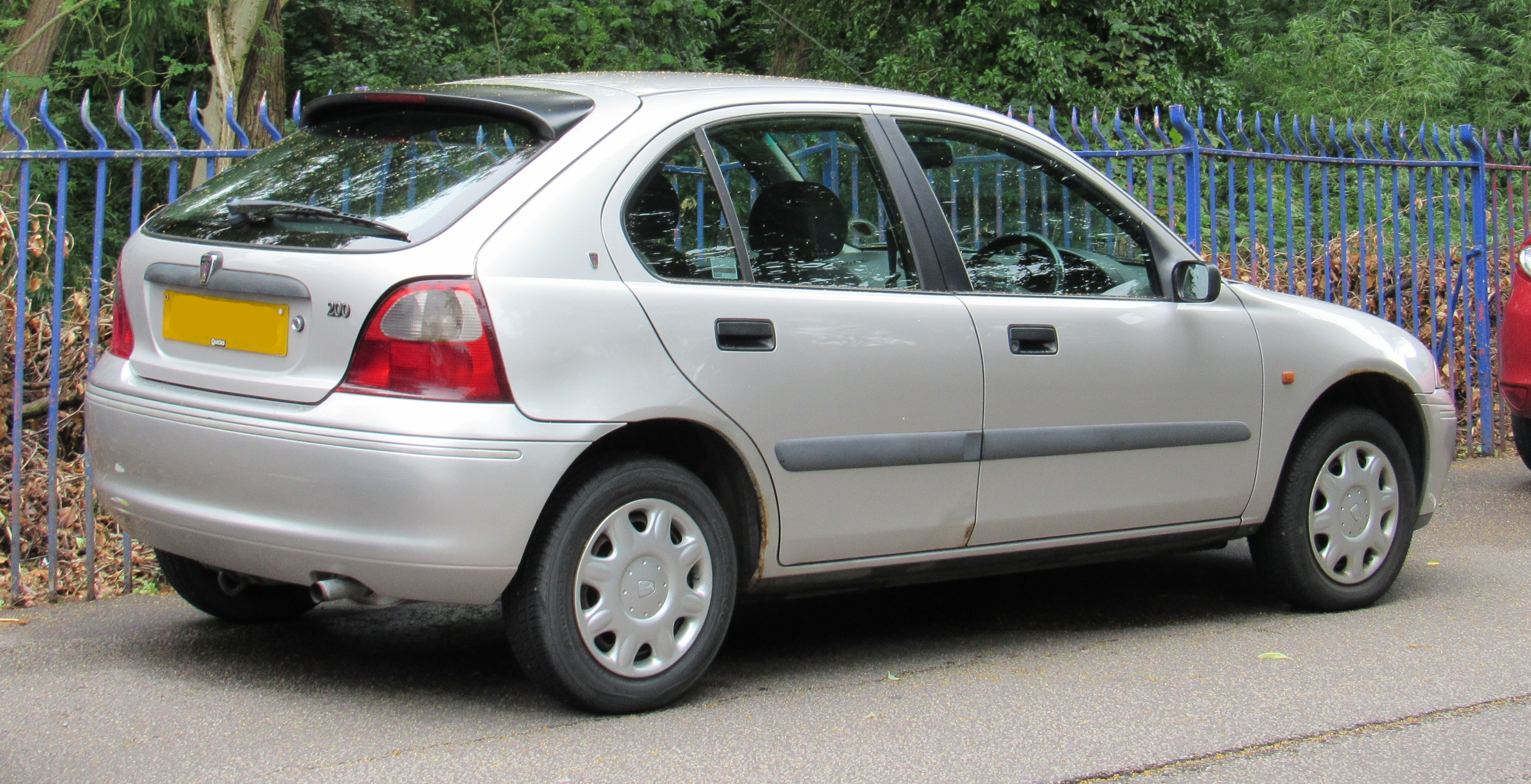
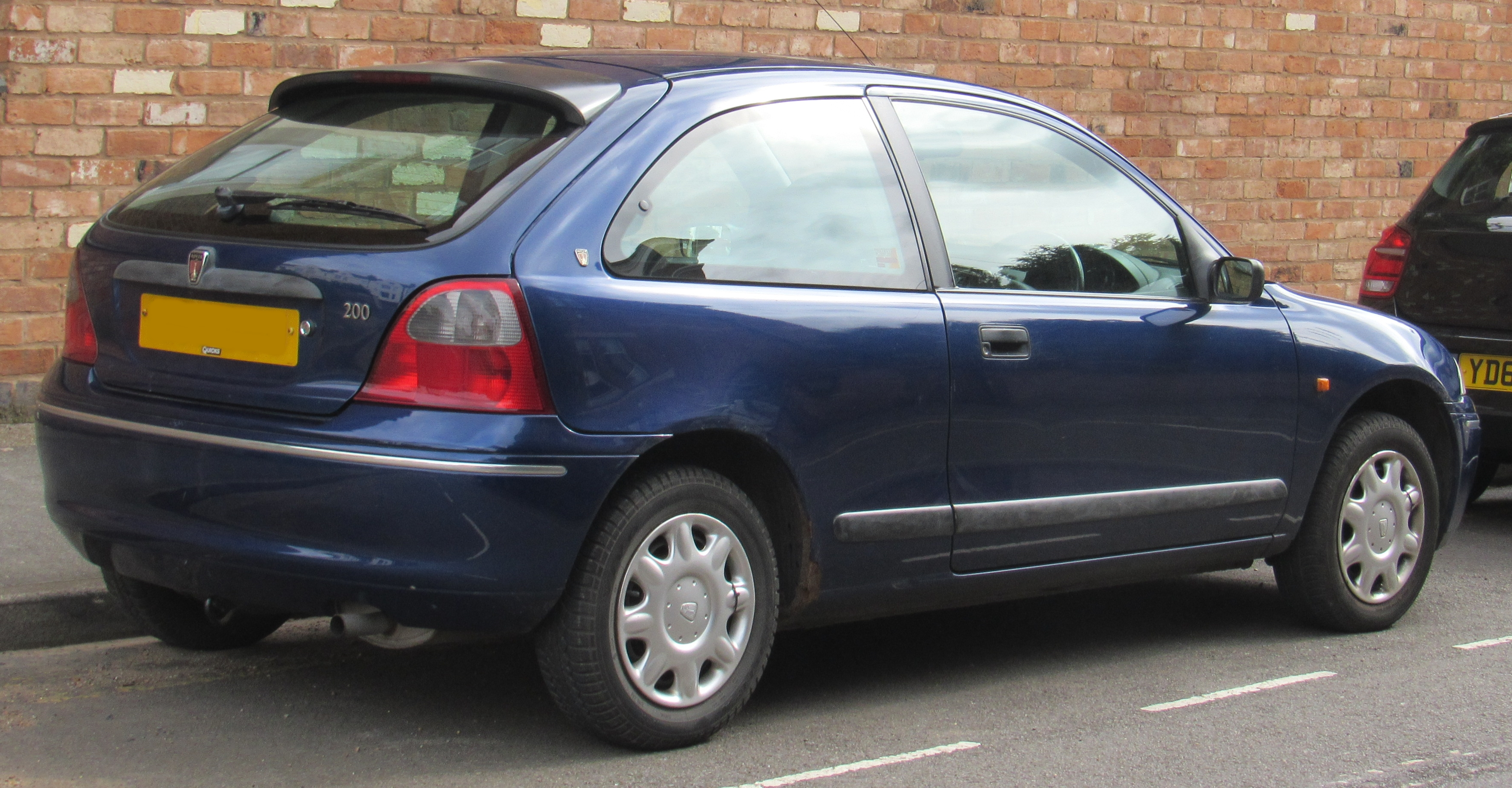
Rear views of 5-door and 3-door hatchbacks

The next generation Rover 200 was unveiled at the London Motor Show in October 1995 with a press launch in Italy in late November. Codenamed R3, it was smaller than the previous Honda-based R8 cars. This was due to Rover's need to replace the ageing Metro, which by now was 15 years old. Although some elements of the previous 200 / 400 were carried over (most notably the front structure, heater, steering and front suspension), this 200 became the Rover Group's first new mass-market car to be designed in-house since the Austin Montego in 1984.

Honda were contracted by Rover to provide tooling and feasibility experts working alongside their Rover colleagues both in Japan and in the Design Studio at Canley. This was also at a time when Honda were moving production of the Honda Concerto replacement from Longbridge to Swindon, freeing up capacity for 60,000 units at Rover. At this point, the car had a cut-down version of the previous car's rear floor and suspension and was codenamed SK3 but was not sufficiently profitable.

After a delay, to consider several options to maintain production volumes at Longbridge, the SK3 project was revised by the Rover Engineering Team. The major change being a Maestro/Montego derived H-frame rear suspension package that allowed fitment of a fuel tank, a full-size spare wheel and an exhaust silencer whilst retaining a good-sized boot, as opposed to only 3-out-of-4 that the carry-over R8 rear suspension allowed in the SK3 package. This also saved over £100 per car allowing the project to be approved for production. The new programme was renamed R3, to align with other programmes.

The R3 featured a completely redesigned interior and dashboard to accommodate the fitment of a passenger airbag in line with new safety standards. Changes to the front structure, with the addition of a transverse strut at the back of the engine bay, improved the crash performance of the car. The Rover 200 was sized somewhere between superminis such as the Ford Fiesta and Vauxhall Corsa and small family cars such as the Ford Escort and Vauxhall Astra, while being priced like the latter. Rover's only offering in the supermini segment at the time was the ageing Metro and this gap in the company's line-up needed to be filled.

=== Engines ===
By the time the car was launched, Honda and Rover had already been "divorced" after the BMW takeover the previous year. The new 200 used K-series petrol engines, most notably the 1.8 L VVC version from the MGF, and L-series diesel engine. In the mid-1990s the L-series was a very competitive engine, regarded as second only to the Volkswagen TDI in overall performance, and an improvement over the R8's XUD - particularly in fuel economy, while almost matching it for refinement.

Launched with 1.4i 16v (105 PS; 77 kW; 104 bhp) and 1.6i 16v (111 PS; 82 kW; 109 bhp) petrol engines and 2.0 turbodiesel (86 PS; 63 kW; 85 bhp and intercooled 105 PS; 77 kW; 104 bhp versions) engines, the range grew later to include a 1.1i (60 PS; 44 kW; 59 bhp) and 1.4i 8v (75 PS; 55 kW; 74 bhp) engines and also 1.8 16v units in standard (120 PS; 88 kW; 118 bhp) and variable valve formats (145 PS; 107 kW; 143 bhp). R65 Peugeot/Rover Manual gearboxes carried over from the R8 Rover 200 were available across the range and a CVT option was available on the 1.6i 16v unit.

The 1.8-litre models earned a certain amount of praise for their performance, whilst the intercooled turbo diesel was claimed as one of the fastest-accelerating diesel hatchbacks on the market in the late 1990s.

=== Body styles ===
Unlike its predecessor, the R3 was not available in Coupe, Cabriolet or Tourer bodystyles, although Rover updated these versions of the older model with mild styling revisions and the fitting of the new dashboard from the R3, which was possible due to the shared front bulkhead. In the UK, these models were no longer branded as 200/400 models, simply being referred to as the Rover Coupe, Cabriolet and Tourer.

=== Rover 200 BRM ===
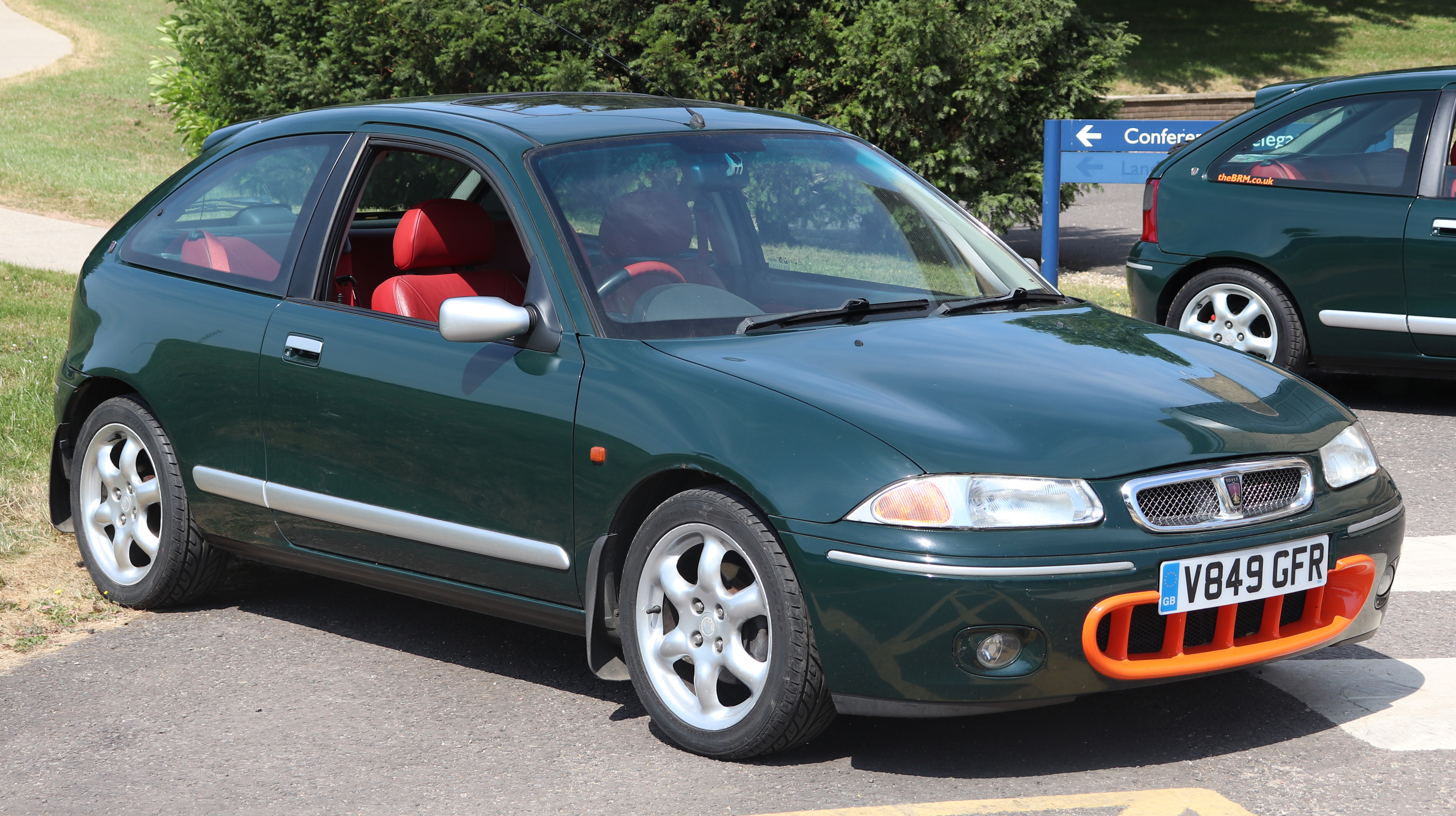
1999 Rover 200 BRM

The Rover 200 BRM was first shown at the 1997 Frankfurt Motor Show, the reaction from the press and public was good enough that after a year of development the Rover 200 BRM LE was officially launched at the British Motor Show in October 1998. It was based on the range-topping Vi model but with 1960's BRM styling cues. The engine was the 145 PS (107 kW) 1.8-litre VVC K-Series.

Inside, there were red quilted leather seats and door panels, red carpet, seat belts and steering wheel. Alloy heater controls and turned aluminium trim complimented this. On the outside, there was Brooklands Green paintwork, with silver trim details, 16-inch alloy wheels, and an exclusive woven mesh grille sat above a large orange snout in the front bumper, which was the BRM trademark nose on all of its 1960s Formula One racing cars.

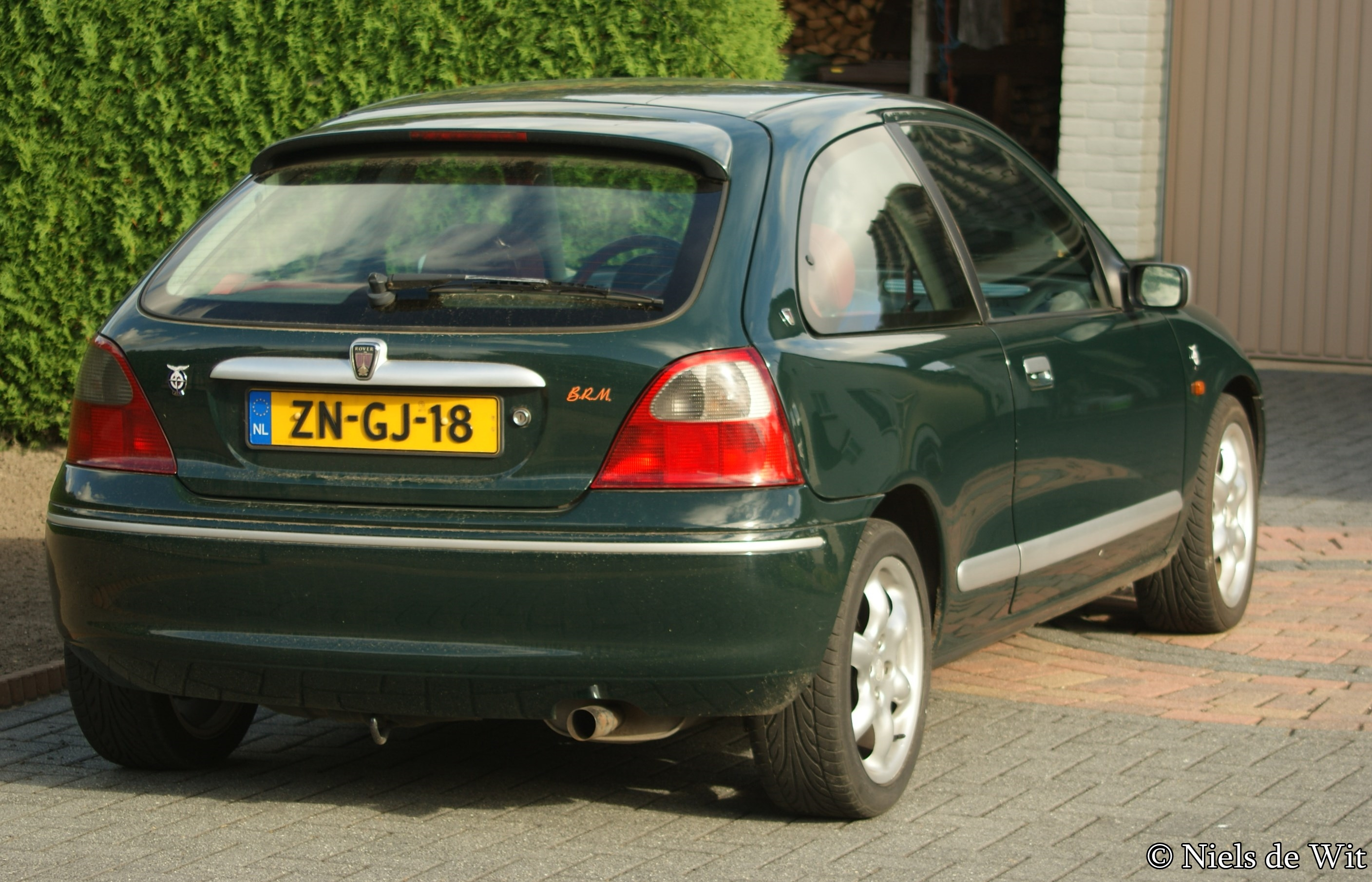
1999 Rover 200 BRM (rear)

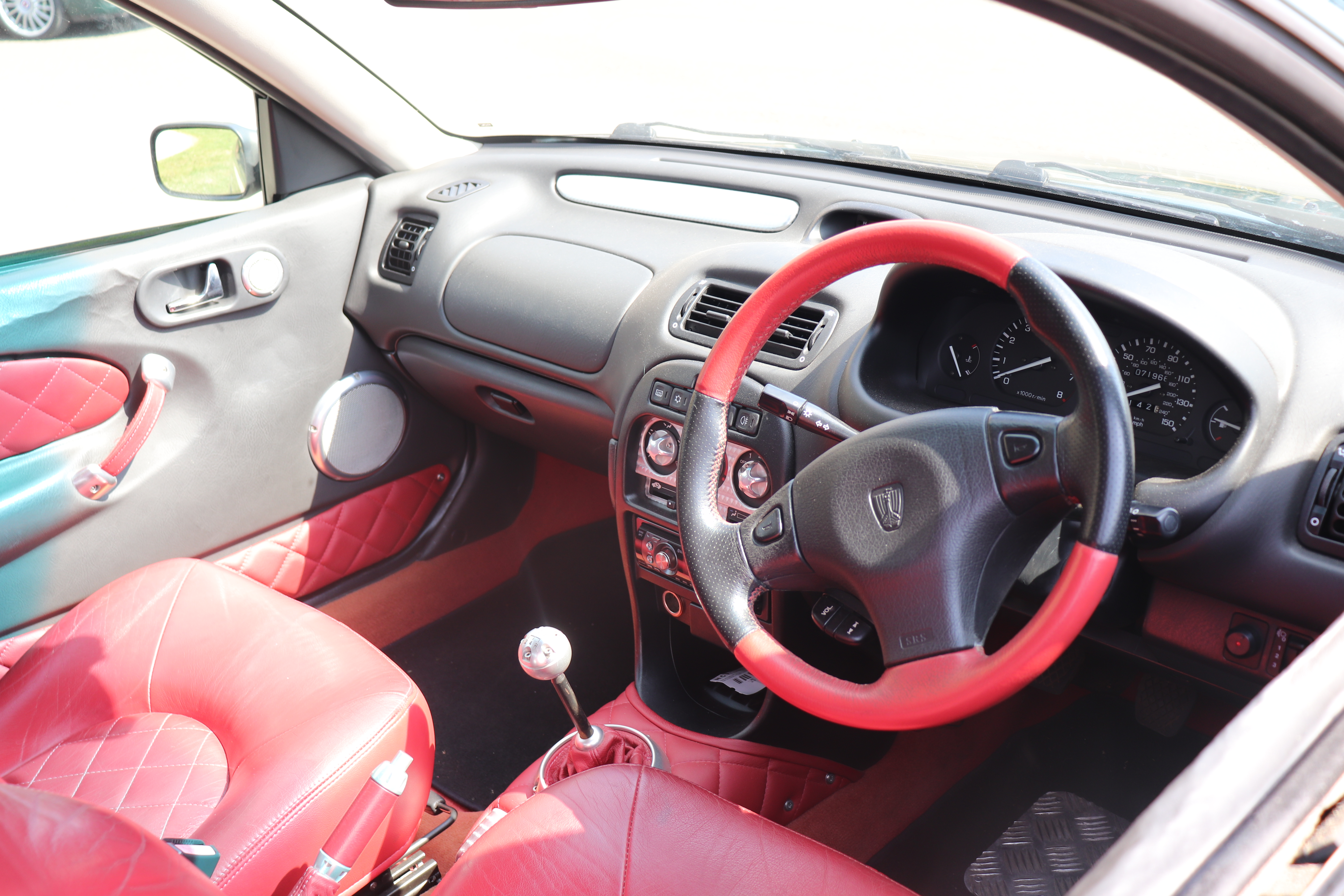
1999 Rover 200 BRM interior

Technical adjustments consisted of 20 mm (0.8 in) lower ride height over the Vi and improved damping and handling, a close-ratio gearbox with a TorSen differential further developed from the Rover 220 Turbo, reduced torque steer and improved straight-line stability.

The price was £18,000, excluding extras such as air conditioning, passenger airbag and a CD player. There were originally thought to be only 795 built for the UK, but this was later corrected to be 797, with an additional 350 for overseas markets. The steep price was originally slashed to £16,000 and when the Rover 25 was launched, this was cut to £14,000 to get rid of vehicles still lingering in showrooms.

=== Safety ===
The NCWR organisation (New Car Whiplash Ratings) tested the Rover 200 and awarded it the following scores:

NCWR	Score
Geometric:	G
Dynamic:	A
Overall:	A

G = Good A = Acceptable M = Marginal P = Poor

=== Reception ===
The third generation 200 was initially popular, being Britain's seventh-best-selling new car in 1996 through to 1998. Within three years it had fallen out of the top 10 completely and was being outsold by traditionally poorer selling cars like the Fiat Bravo/Brava and Renault Mégane.

The Rover 200 received moderate to good reviews from the motoring press.

- Parker's Car Guides
  'Pros: Cheap to buy; good to drive.' | 'Cons: Reliability hasn't been good.'
- RAC
  'It may not be 'Above All' but it's certainly a Rover. These days that means class, which, in this case, needn't cost a lot.'

== Rover 25 (1999–2005) ==
Rover 25
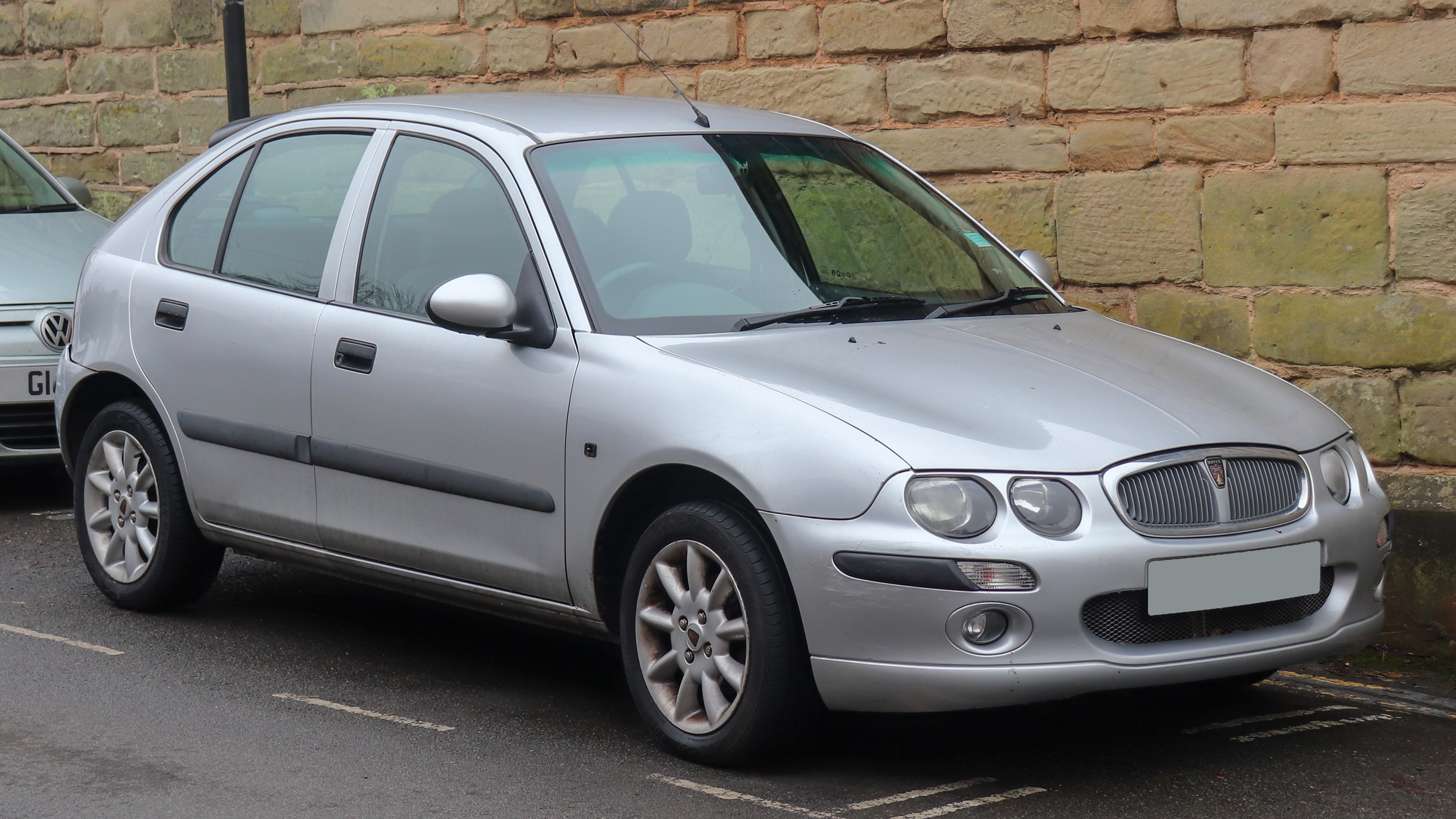

Overview
- Production: 1999–2005
- Designer: Peter Stevens

Body and chassis
- Body style: 3/5-door hatchback (25); 3-door panel van (Commerce)
- Related: Rover 45; Rover Streetwise; MG ZR; MG 3 SW

Powertrain
- Engine: petrol: 1.1 L K-series I4; 1.4 L K-series I4; 1.6 L K-series I4; 1.8 L K-series I4; 1.8 L K-series VVC I4; diesel: 2.0 L L-series turbo I4
- Transmission: 5-speed manual 6-speed automatic CVT

Dimensions
- Wheelbase: 2,500 mm (98.4 in)
- Length: 3,990 mm (157.1 in)
- Width: 1,690 mm (66.5 in)
- Height: 1,420 mm (55.9 in)

A facelifted version of the Rover 200, renamed the Rover 25 (internal codename Jewel) was unveiled at the London Motor Show on 6 October 1999 and launched in showrooms in Britain on 25 November. It was repositioned and priced to compete with the Ford Fiesta and Vauxhall Corsa, rather than larger cars like the Ford Focus and Vauxhall Astra. This version used similar frontal styling to the larger 75 model. The chassis had been uprated to give sportier handling (suspension and steering setup from 200vi) and the front end had been restyled to give it the corporate Rover look first seen in the range-topping 75, a number of safety improvements and interior changes were made, but the 25 was instantly recognisable as a reworked 200 Series.

The 1.4 L, 1.6 L, and 1.8 L petrol engines as well as the 2.0 L diesel were all carried over from the previous range. CVT automatic gearboxes were carried over from the R3 200, with 'Steptronic' (later 'Stepspeed' post-BMW demerger) semi-automatic system available from late 2000. R65 manual gearboxes were again carried over but were later superseded by Ford 'IB5' units in mid-2003. The 1.8-litre engined cars and all diesels used Rover's PG1 5-speed manual gearbox throughout the car's life.

The Rover 25 also saw the introduction, from autumn 2000, of the 16V twin-cam version of the 1.1 L K-Series engine, replacing the 1.1 single-cam 8-valve K-Series engine previously found in the Rover 211i. This development saw power boosted from 60 to 75 PS (44 to 55 kW; 59 to 74 bhp).

=== Trim levels, variants, and facelift ===
Initially available in i, iE, iS, iL and GTi trim levels, a range topping iXL model was introduced in 2002 adding full leather upholstery, passenger airbag and 15-inch 'Coronet' alloy wheels to the iL specification. Initially available with the 1.6-litre K series engine, a 1.4-litre version of the iXL followed.

Less than a year after the Rover 25 was launched, BMW sold the Rover Group to the Phoenix consortium for a token £10. By the summer of 2001, the newly named MG Rover Group had introduced a sporty version of the Rover 25: the MG ZR. It had modified interior and exterior styling, as well as sports suspension, to give the car the look of a "hot" hatchback. The largest engine in the range was the 1.8 VVC 160 PS (118 kW; 158 bhp) unit, which had a top speed of 210 km/h (130 mph). It was frequently the UK's best-selling "hot hatch". At this time the Rover 25 GTi was discontinued.

In 2003, Rover made a version of the car with increased ride height and chunkier bumpers, called Streetwise. The car was marketed by Rover as an "urban on-roader". They also introduced a van version of the 25 called the Rover Commerce.

In 2004, MG Rover gave the cars an exterior restyle to make them look more modern. The majority of changes however were focused on the interior, which featured a completely new layout and fascia design. Trim levels were revised to i, Si, SEi and SXi, with high-spec leather-trimmed GLi, GSi and GXi models introduced for the 2005 model year.

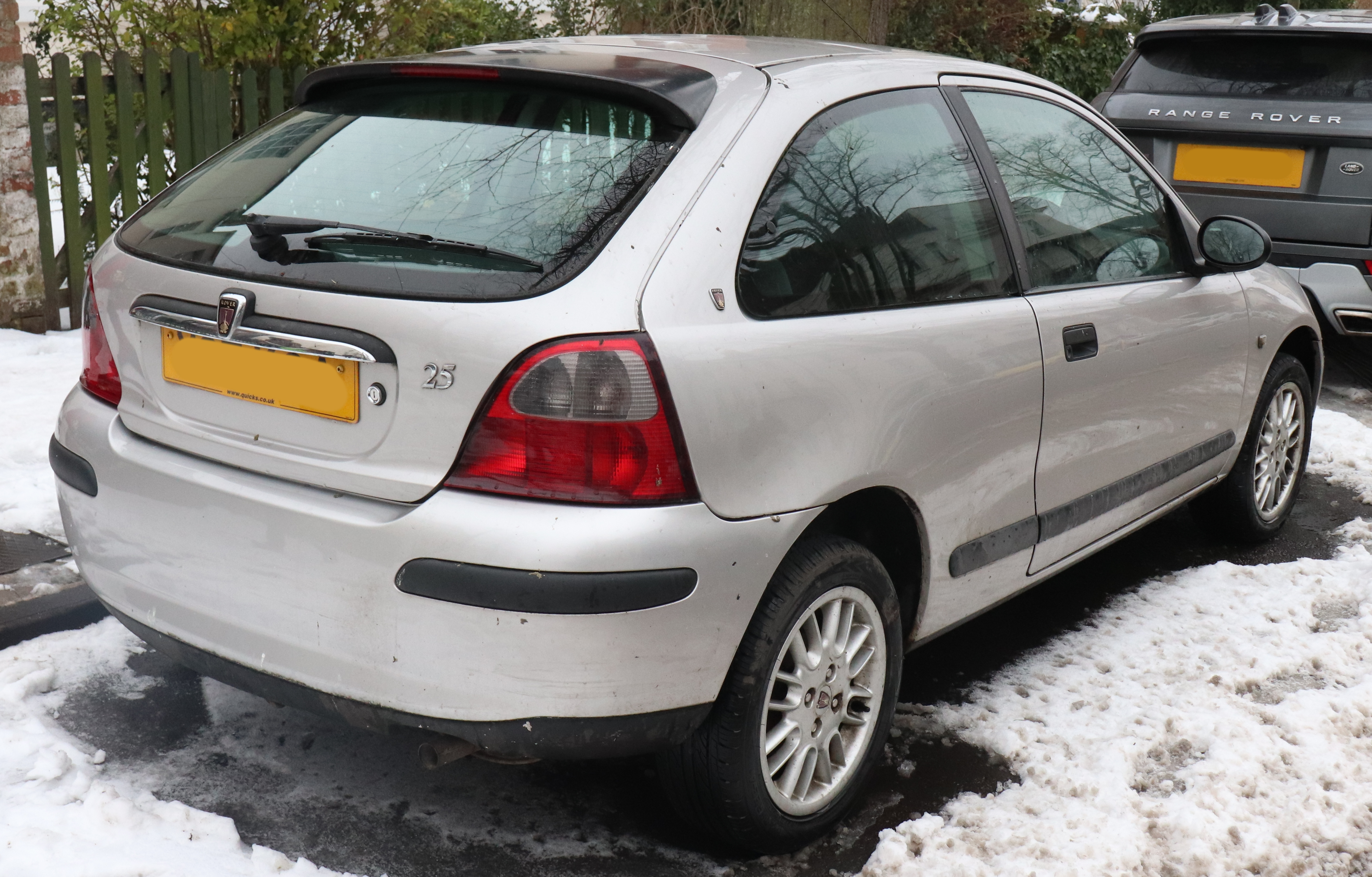
3-door Rover 25

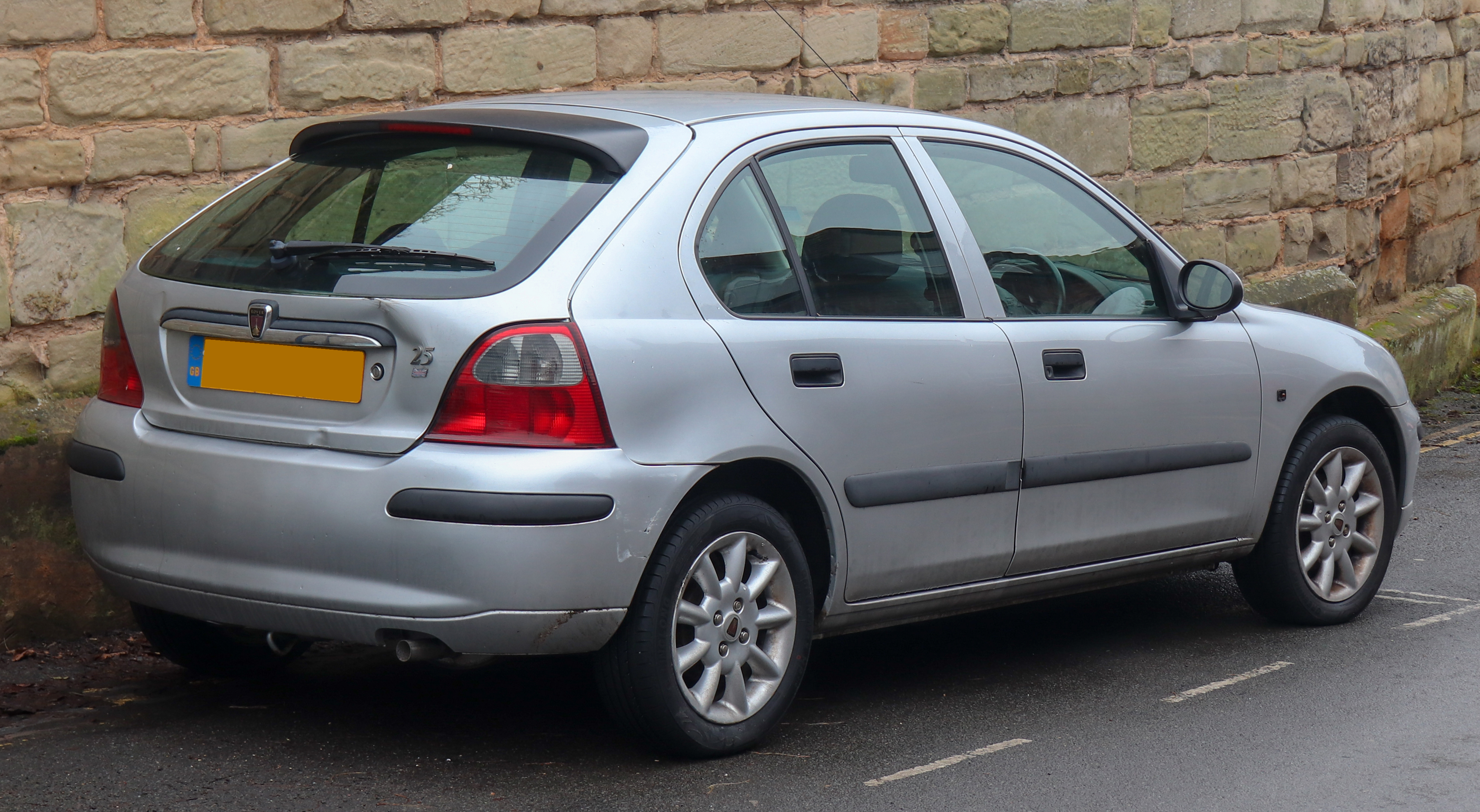
5-door Rover 25

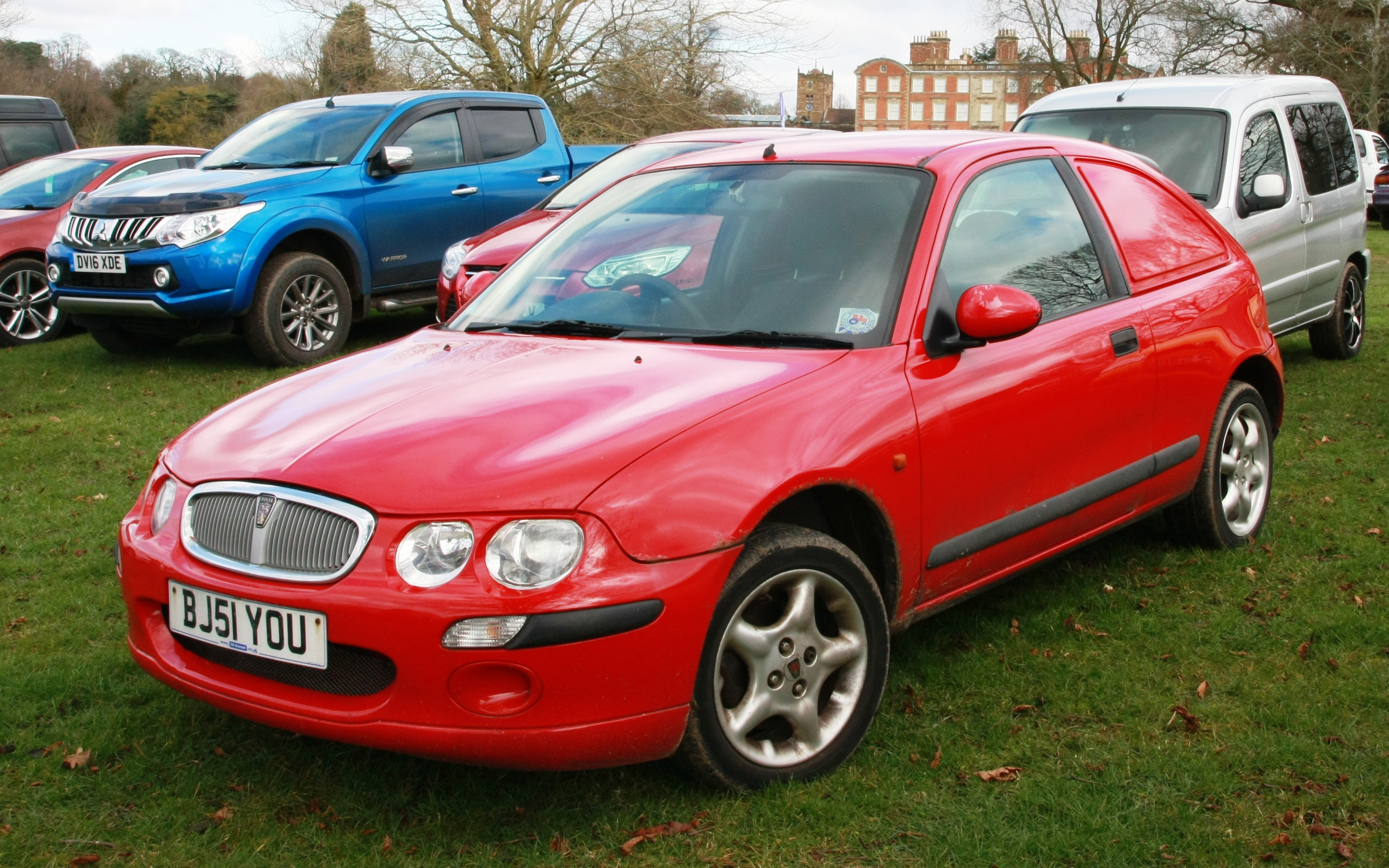
Rover Commerce (van)

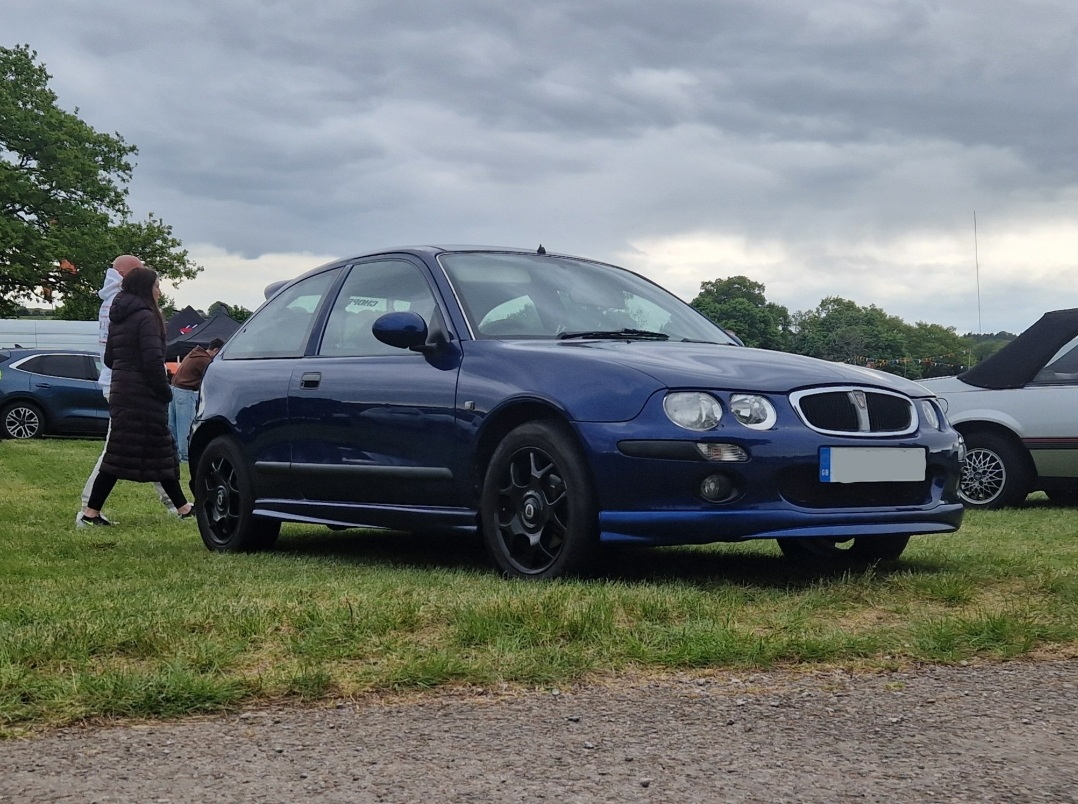
Rover 25 fitted with an MG ZR bodykit

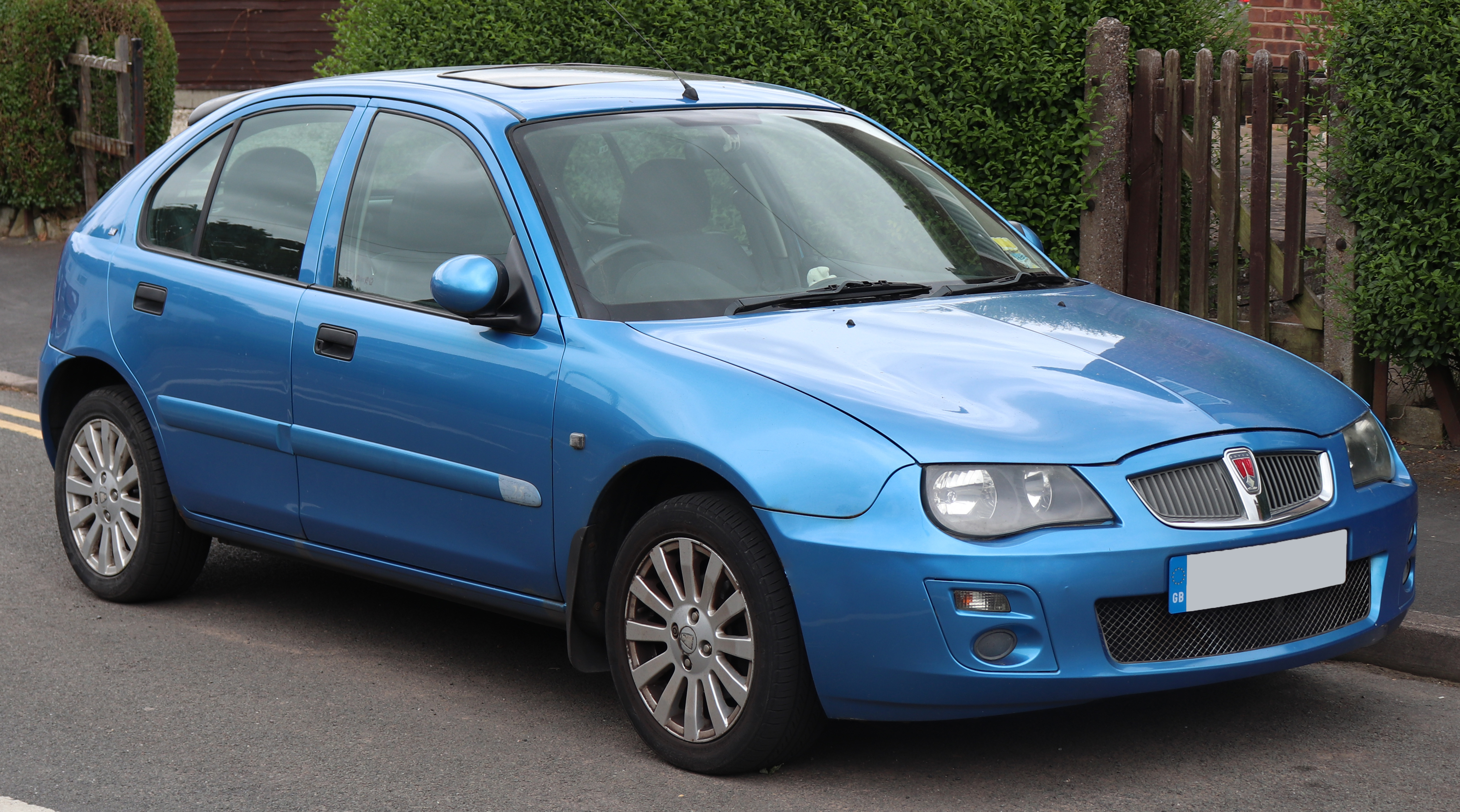
2004 facelift

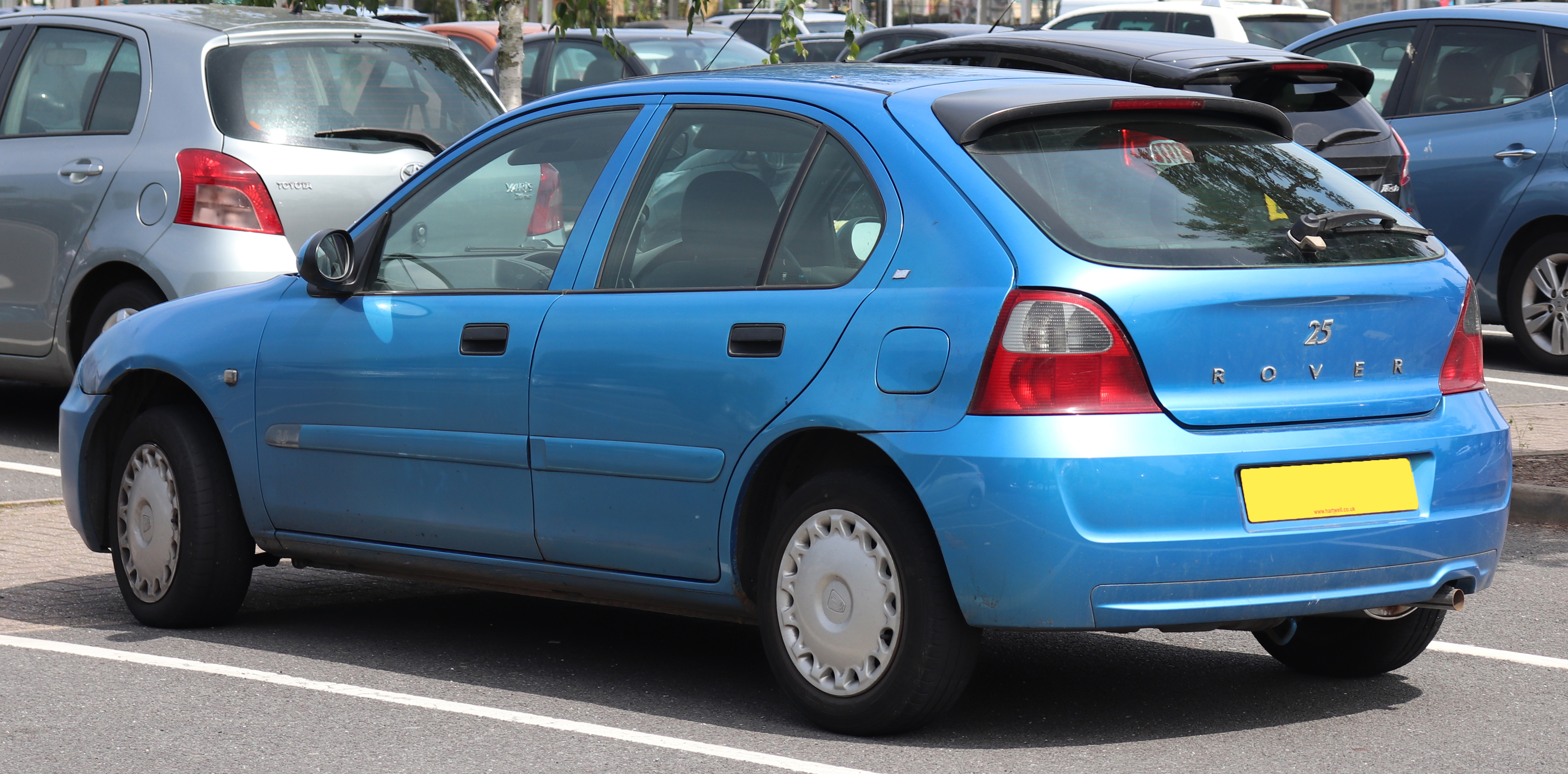
2004 facelift

=== End of production ===
Production of both cars was suspended in April 2005 when the company went into administration. In March 2005, the 25 won the "Bargain of the Year Award" at the Auto Express Used Car Honours: "The compact hatchback was recognised by the judges for the availability and affordability that help make five-year old examples an attractive purchase proposition."

In late 2005, a prototype hybrid drivetrain version was seen in the Longbridge flight shed while Richard Porter was doing urban exploration of Longbridge for Top Gear magazine. "There was a Rover 25 which had a load of paperwork around it and it seemed like it had a hybrid drivetrain". They also had a 1st generation Toyota Prius parked at the side of the flight shed while MG was open and operational for benchmarking purposes prior to 2005.

Specifications for the Rover 25 design were purchased by Shanghai Automotive Industry Corporation in early 2005, though new MG Rover Group owner, Nanjing Automobile Group now owns the tooling for the car. In 2008, the Streetwise, rebadged as the MG 3SW, was relaunched in China.

=== Safety ===
The 25 underwent the Euro NCAP car safety tests in 2001 and achieved the following ratings:

Euro NCAP	Rating
Adult occupant:	3/5 stars
Child occupant:	n/a
Pedestrian:	2/4 stars

The NCWR organisation (New Car Whiplash Ratings) tested the facelifted Rover 25 and awarded it the following scores:

NCWR	Score
Geometric:	M
Dynamic:	n/a
Overall:	P

G = Good A = Acceptable M = Marginal P = Poor

=== Security ===
The Rover 25 was tested by Thatcham's New Vehicle Security Ratings (NVSR) organisation and achieved the following ratings:

< 06/2003	Rating
Theft of car:	2/5 stars
Theft from car:	1/5 stars

> 07/2003	Rating
Theft of car:	5/5 stars
Theft from car:	4/5 stars

=== Sales ===
The Rover 25 was Britain's best selling new car in April 2000, due to a brief surge in sales among buyers wanting to support the company at the time of their sell–off by BMW. However, sales quickly settled back down to normal levels, and although the asking price was now in line with other superminis, the 25 was never able to seriously compete with the Ford Fiesta and Vauxhall Corsa in terms of popularity. It was outsold by the Peugeot 206, Fiat Punto, Volkswagen Polo, Seat Ibiza, Skoda Fabia and Renault Clio.

=== Reviews ===
The Rover 25 received mixed to good reviews from the motoring press.

- The AA
  'The original 200 ... was never going to sell against the Golfs and Astras of the time, even though that was the sales pitch and price. The 25 remedied this. We're left with a hatchback that's now the right size and price to compete; if only it were better equipped and these lower-range versions offered a bit more comfort when they're on the move.'
- Parker's Car Guides
  'Pros: Sporty driving experience, good quality.'
  'Cons: Cramped interior.'
- RAC
  'The Rover 25 series has developed into a very fine range of cars [and] additional chassis work had taken place ... to bring the standard models up to the old 200vi's handling standards. Rover's repositioning of the car had propelled a middle-order family hatch to somewhere near the top of the supermini class.'
- What Car? Reader Reviews
  'For – The 25 is cheap, quiet and has a roomy boot. Fuel consumption is good on petrols, too.'
  'Against – The interior is plain, build quality is iffy, the turbodiesel is unrefined, and safety standards are poor.'

== Powertrains ==
These were the engines available for the Rover 200 (1995–1999) and Rover 25 (1999–2005). Each engine was modified at regular intervals throughout its life with economy and emissions improving with the changes.

Years	Model & Transmission	Engine	Power	Torque	Top Speed	0–62 mph 0–100 km/h	Fuel economy	Emissions (CO_{2})
Petrol							Fuel economy	Emissions (CO_{2})
1998–2001	1.1 8v Manual	1.1 L, 4 in-L	60 PS (44 kW; 59 hp)	90 N⋅m (66 lb⋅ft)	155 km/h (96 mph)	14.5 secs	42.0 mpg_{‑imp} (6.73 L/100 km; 35.0 mpg_{‑US})	165 g/km
2001–2005	1.1 16v Manual	1.1 L, 4 in-L	75 PS (55 kW; 74 hp)	95 N⋅m (70 lb⋅ft)	161 km/h (100 mph)	13.5 secs	41.3 mpg_{‑imp} (6.84 L/100 km; 34.4 mpg_{‑US})	160 g/km
1995–1999	1.4 8v Manual	1.4 L, 4 in-L	74 PS (54 kW; 73 hp)	117 N⋅m (86 lb⋅ft)	166 km/h (103 mph)	12.5 secs	41.0 mpg_{‑imp} (6.89 L/100 km; 34.1 mpg_{‑US})	170 g/km
1999–2005	1.4 16v 84 Manual	1.4 L, 4 in-L	84 PS (62 kW; 83 hp)	110 N⋅m (81 lb⋅ft)	169 km/h (105 mph)	11.8 secs	41.3 mpg_{‑imp} (6.84 L/100 km; 34.4 mpg_{‑US})	164 g/km
1996–1999	1.4 16v 103 Manual	1.4 L, 4 in-L	103 PS (76 kW; 102 hp)	127 N⋅m (94 lb⋅ft)	185 km/h (115 mph)	10.0 secs	39.0 mpg_{‑imp} (7.24 L/100 km; 32.5 mpg_{‑US})	173 g/km
1999–2005	1.4 16v 103 Manual	1.4 L, 4 in-L	103 PS (76 kW; 102 hp)	123 N⋅m (91 lb⋅ft)	180 km/h (112 mph)	10.2 secs	41.3 mpg_{‑imp} (6.84 L/100 km; 34.4 mpg_{‑US})	164 g/km
1995–1999	1.6 16v Manual	1.6 L, 4 in-L	111 PS (82 kW; 109 hp)	145 N⋅m (107 lb⋅ft)	190 km/h (118 mph)	9.3 secs	39.0 mpg_{‑imp} (7.24 L/100 km; 32.5 mpg_{‑US})	176 g/km
1999–2005	1.6 16v Manual	1.6 L, 4 in-L	110 PS (81 kW; 108 hp)	138 N⋅m (102 lb⋅ft)	185 km/h (115 mph)	9.5 secs	41.3 mpg_{‑imp} (6.84 L/100 km; 34.4 mpg_{‑US})	164 g/km
2001–2005	1.6 16v Steptronic	1.6 L, 4 in-L	110 PS (81 kW; 108 hp)	138 N⋅m (102 lb⋅ft)	177 km/h (110 mph)	10.3 secs	36.6 mpg_{‑imp} (7.7 L/100 km; 30.5 mpg_{‑US})	184 g/km
1997–1999	1.8 16v Manual	1.8 L, 4 in-L	120 PS (88 kW; 118 hp)	165 N⋅m (122 lb⋅ft)	195 km/h (121 mph)	8.6 secs	38.3 mpg_{‑imp} (7.38 L/100 km; 31.9 mpg_{‑US})	179 g/km
1999–2002	1.8 16v Steptronic	1.8 L, 4 in-L	117 PS (86 kW; 115 hp)	160 N⋅m (118 lb⋅ft)	185 km/h (115 mph)	9.5 secs	34.7 mpg_{‑imp} (8.1 L/100 km; 28.9 mpg_{‑US})	194 g/km
1997–2002	1.8 16v VVC Manual	1.8 L, 4 in-L	145 PS (107 kW; 143 hp)	174 N⋅m (128 lb⋅ft)	204 km/h (127 mph)	7.5 secs	37.8 mpg_{‑imp} (7.47 L/100 km; 31.5 mpg_{‑US})	178 g/km
Diesel
1995–1999	2.0 TD 86 Manual	2.0 L, 4 in-L	86 PS (63 kW; 85 hp)	170 N⋅m (125 lb⋅ft)	169 km/h (105 mph)	12.0 secs	49.5 mpg_{‑imp} (5.71 L/100 km; 41.2 mpg_{‑US})	166 g/km
1995–1999	2.0 TD 105 Manual	2.0 L, 4 in-L	105 PS (77 kW; 104 hp)	210 N⋅m (155 lb⋅ft)	185 km/h (115 mph)	9.7 secs	50.1 mpg_{‑imp} (5.64 L/100 km; 41.7 mpg_{‑US})	166 g/km
1999–2005	2.0 TD 101 Manual	2.0 L, 4 in-L	101 PS (74 kW; 100 hp)	240 N⋅m (177 lb⋅ft)	182 km/h (113 mph)	9.9 secs	55.4 mpg_{‑imp} (5.10 L/100 km; 46.1 mpg_{‑US})	150 g/km
2002–2004	2.0 TD 113 Manual	2.0 L, 4 in-L	113 PS (83 kW; 111 hp)	240 N⋅m (177 lb⋅ft)	185 km/h (115 mph)	9.1 secs	51.5 mpg_{‑imp} (5.49 L/100 km; 42.9 mpg_{‑US})	150 g/km

== Motorsport ==
=== British Touring Car Championship ===
A Rover 216 GTI briefly raced in the 1991 British Touring Car Championship.

Grahame Davis drove the car with his own Moto-Build team running it. He entered six races but only made the start at Oulton Park and retired after 3 laps with engine problems.

=== One Make Racing ===
A one-make motor racing series for the Rover 200 series ran from 1991 to 1996. The series was introduced to replace the MG Metro Turbo Challenge that had run in various guises from 1981 to 1990. From 1991 to 1993, the series used the Rover 216 and was called the Dunlop Rover GTI Championship. The series upgraded to the Rover 220 from 1994 onwards and was renamed the Dunlop Rover Turbo Cup.

In 1991, the series supported the British Grand Prix at Silverstone and Eddie Jordan raced in the #1 Celebrity Car, finishing 9th.

In 1996, Tiff Needell raced in the series at Castle Combe for a feature on Top Gear.
