= Parker's Car Guides =

Car prices, valuations and reviews

Parkers

- Parker's Car Price Guide, April 1991 issue
- Editor: Keith Adams
- Categories: Automobile
- Frequency: Online
- Publisher: Bauer Media Group
- Founded: 1972
- Country: United Kingdom
- Language: English
- Website: www.parkers.co.uk

Parkers Car Price Guide is a car valuation, reviews and advice website, and is one of the largest of its type in Europe. It was a monthly magazine between March 1972 and January 2020, and since 1998, a website with reviews and price lists for new and used cars in the United Kingdom, a complete research tool for car buyers.

== History ==
Parkers Car Price Guide was founded in 1972. The 1st issue was released in March 1972, priced at 20p. Full-color front pages came in 1973.

In 1997, Emap bought Parker's portfolio from Parker Mead. The last Parker Mead edition of the Price Guide was in August 1997. The parkers.co.uk website launched in 1999.

Since 2008, Parkers has been owned and published by the German company Bauer Media Group.

== Editorial team ==
The portfolio of products has been edited by Keith Adams since 2016. The commercial vehicles (vans and pickups) section is headed by Tom Webster.

The current editorial team consists of:

- Editor Keith Adams
- Deputy editor Luke Wilkinson

== Timeline ==
- 1998: Winter 1998 was the first edition of 'Parker's Car Chooser Magazine' which ran until 2006
- 2002: Parker's Car Price Guide and Parker's Older Car Price Guide (Parkers Plus) merged
- 2003: Spot colour (red) introduced
- 2003: The company relocates from London to Peterborough and Steve Rose takes over the editors chair from Nick Barfield
- 2005: Parker's Car Price Guides goes full colour with the addition of imagery
- 2006: Summer 2006 - Last edition of Parkers Car Chooser magazine
- 2008: Bauer Consumer Media acquires Emap's Media Division, including Parker's Car Price Guide
- 2011: Parker's loses the apostrophe to be rebranded Parkers
- 2015: Glass's Guide print edition closes, leaving Parkers Car Price Guide as the only printed valuations magazine on the market
- 2015: Bespoke car finance advice section added with Chris Lloyd heading it up
- 2016: Keith Adams replaces Kieren Puffett as editor
- 2017: Parkers Car Price Guides monthly magazine revamped to include road tests, buying guides and more deals-specific content
- 2020: Parkers Car Price Guide monthly magazine ceases publication to concentrate on the Parkers.co.uk website and further develop its valuations tool
