= Honda Civic (eighth generation) =

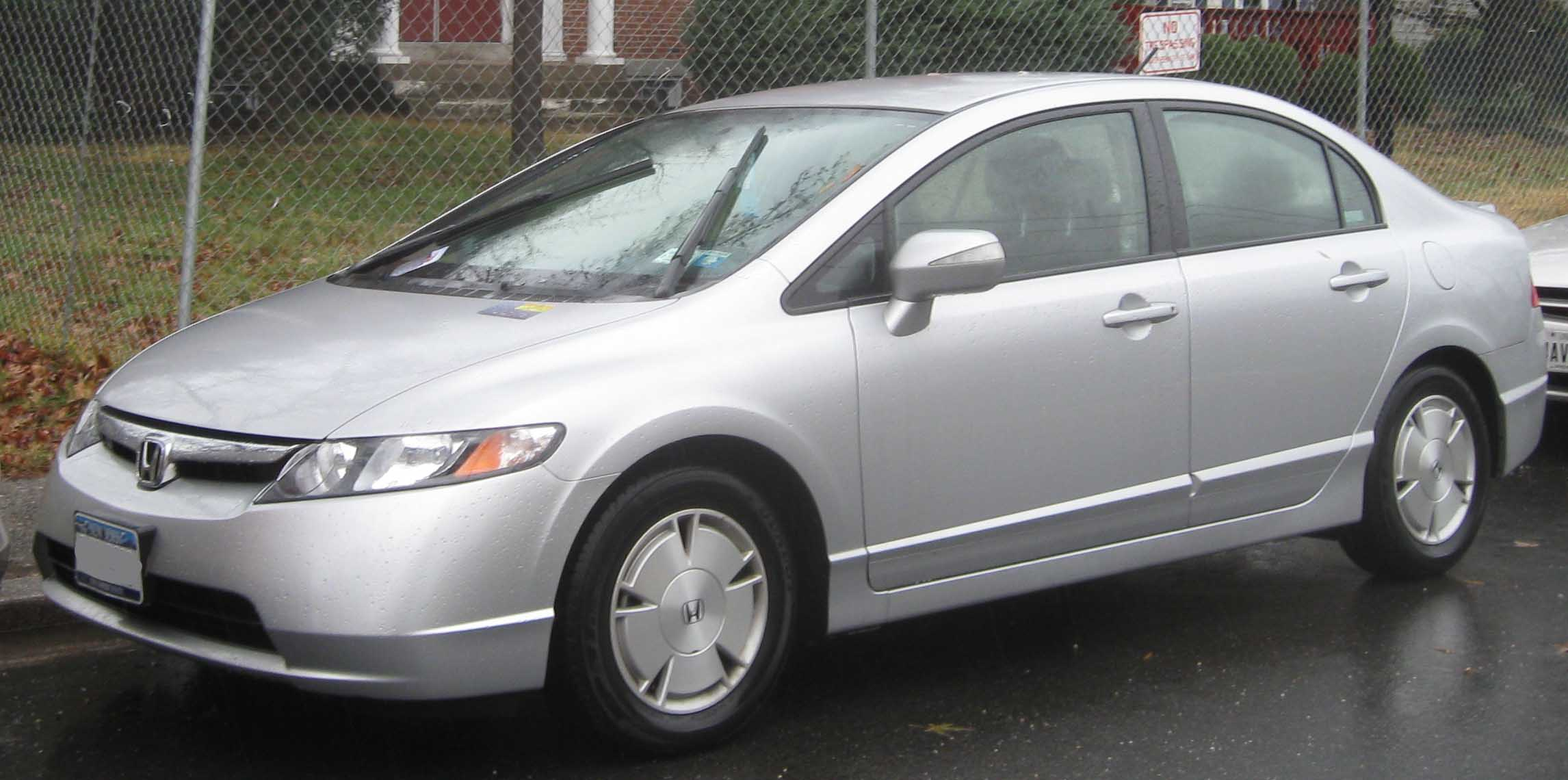
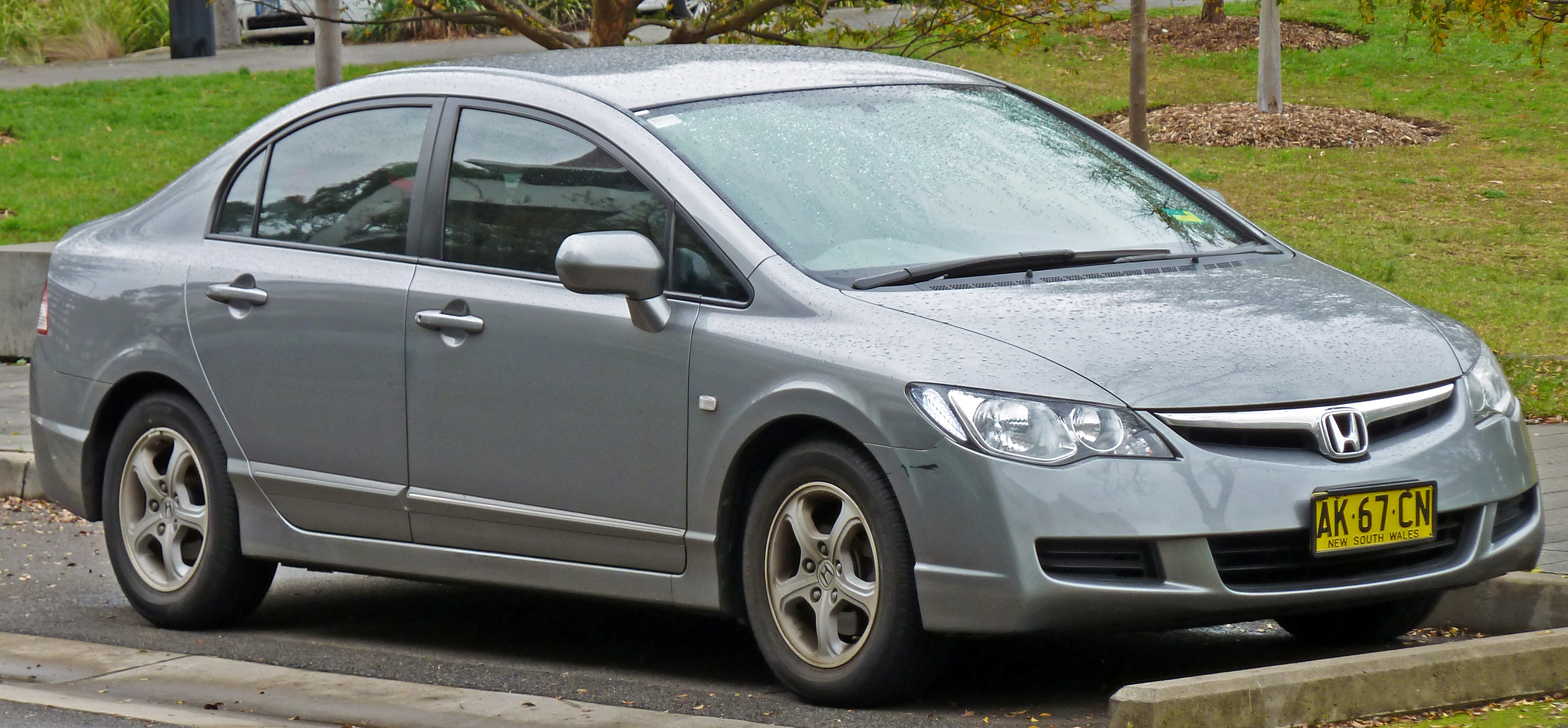
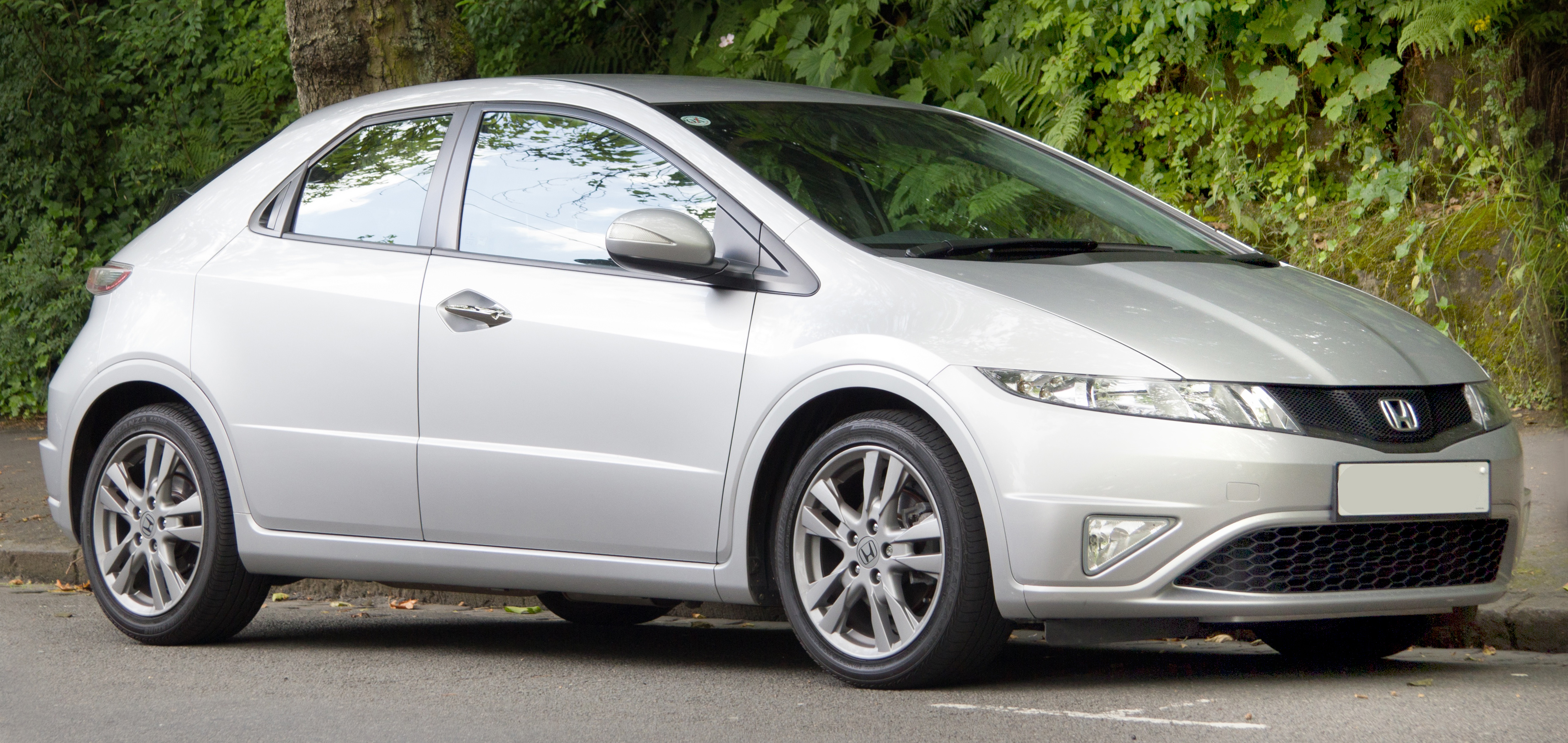
- sedan (FA) sedan (FD) hatchback (FN)

Overview
- Manufacturer: Honda
- Production: 2005–2012; 2006–2016 (China)

Body and chassis
- Class: Compact car (C)
- Layout: Front-engine, front-wheel-drive
- Related: Honda Element; Acura RSX; Honda Integra; Honda CR-V (third generation)

Chronology
- Predecessor: Honda Civic (seventh generation)
- Successor: Honda Civic (ninth generation)

The eighth-generation Honda Civic is a range of compact cars (C-segment) manufactured by Honda between 2005 and 2012, replacing the seventh-generation Civic. Four body styles were introduced throughout its production run, which are sedan, coupe, and both three-door and five-door hatchback. The sedan version was introduced with two distinct styling for different markets, with one of them sold as the Acura CSX in Canada and as the Ciimo 1.8 in China from 2012 until 2016. The hatchback versions formed the European-market Civic range, which received a different architecture, body design and smaller footprint, and solely produced in Swindon, United Kingdom.

The Type R performance model was introduced in 2007 for sedan and three-door hatchback body styles, with the former only sold in Japan and other limited Asian markets.

== Sedan/coupé (FA1–5, FD1–7, FG1–2; 2005) ==
Civic sedan/coupé
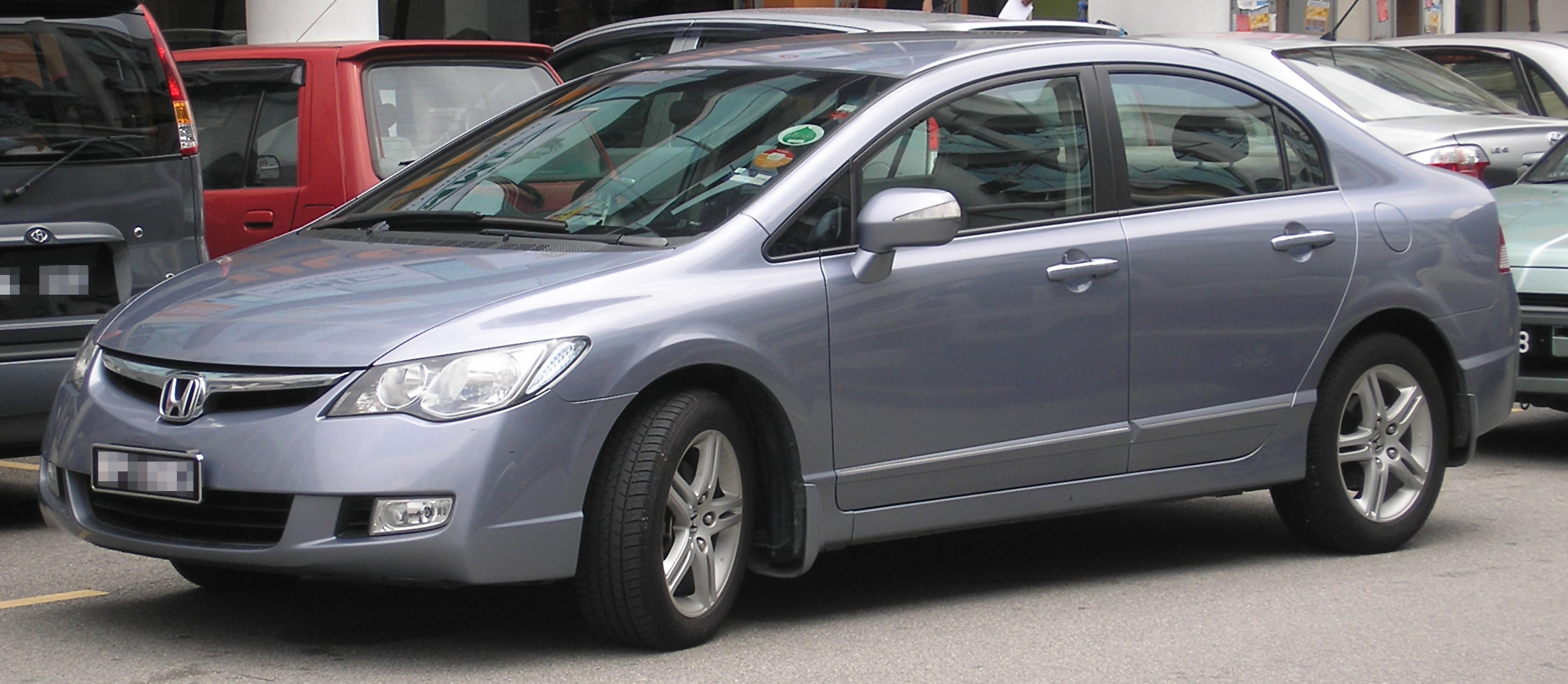
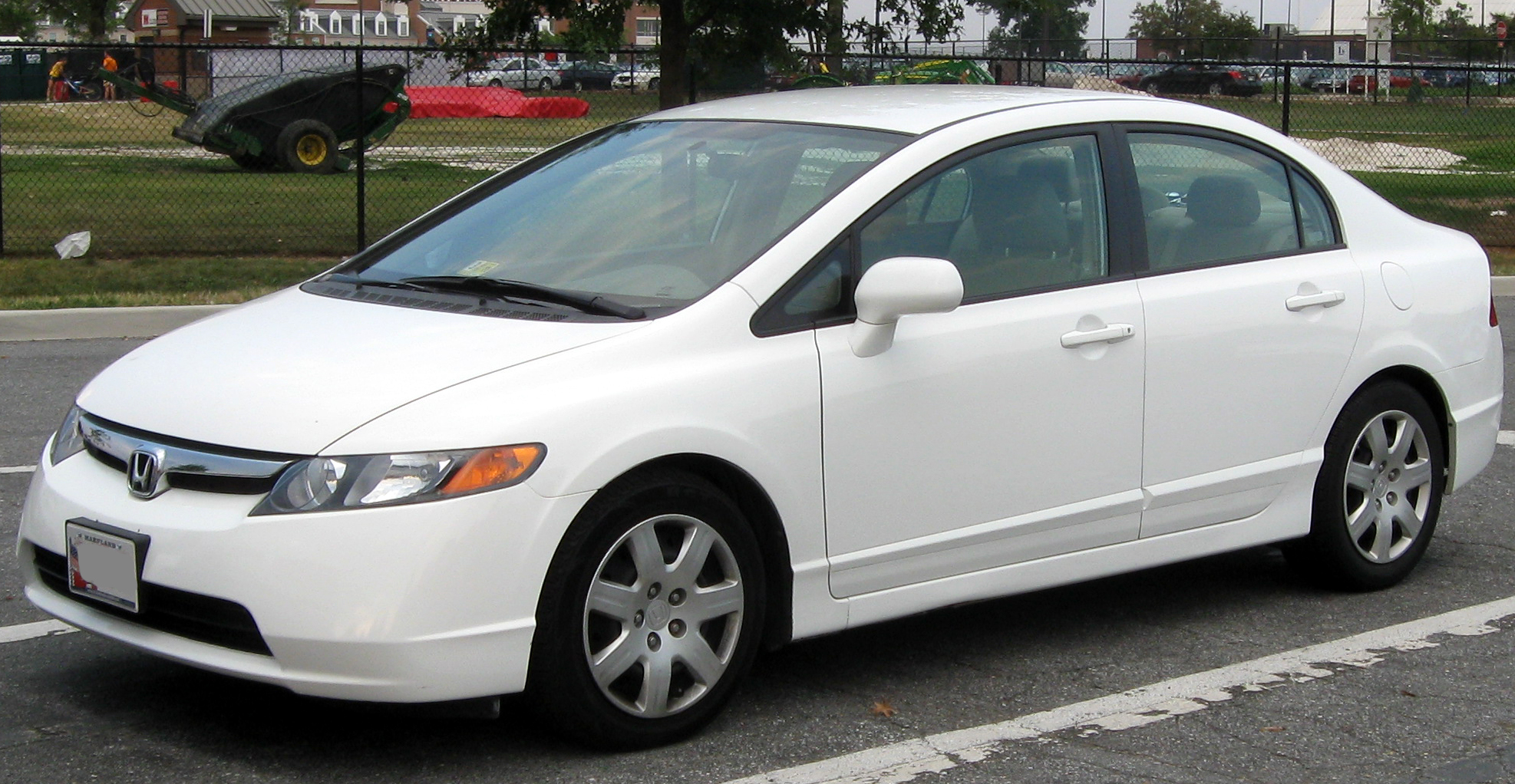
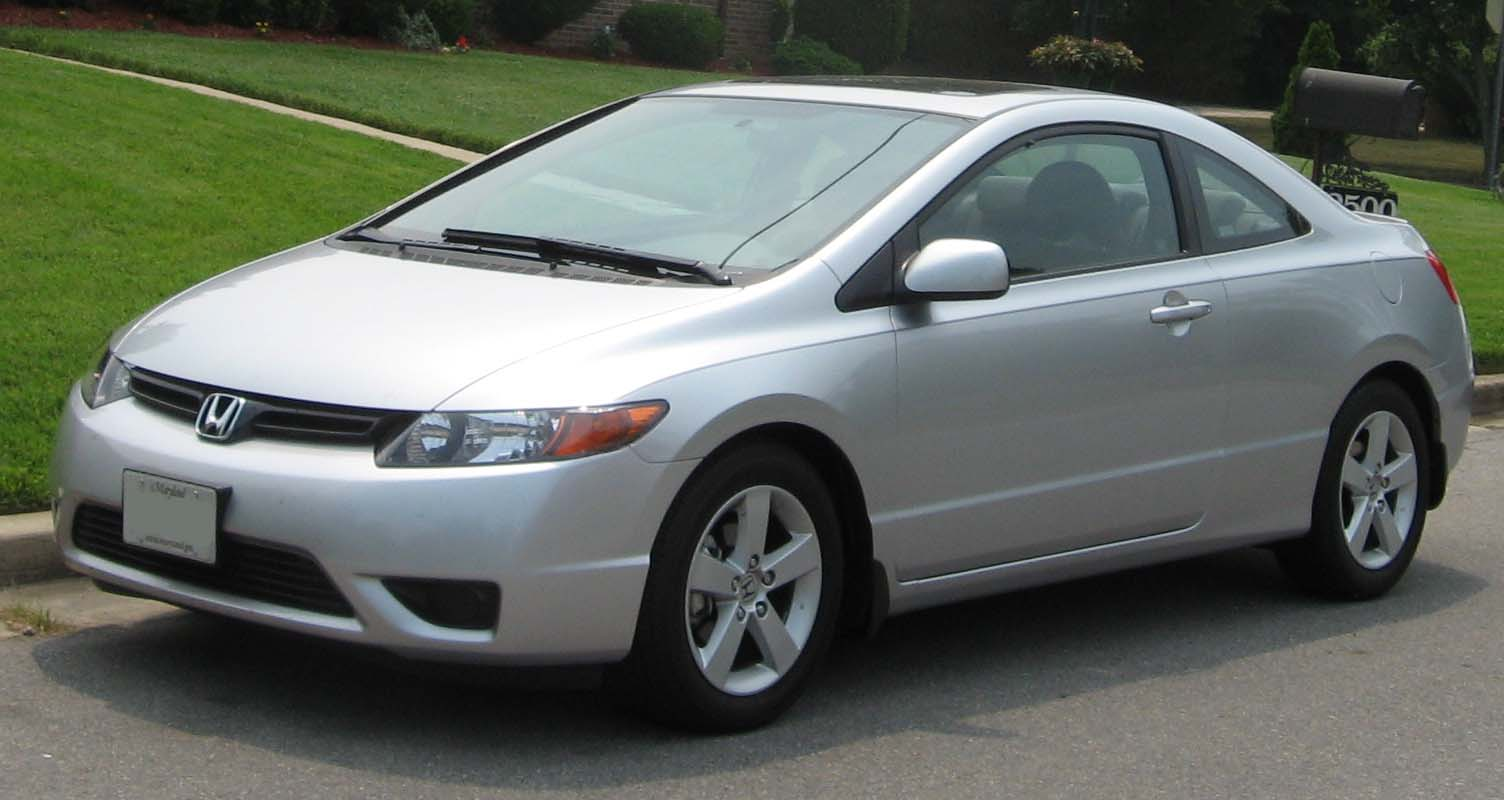
- 2006-2008 Honda Civic sedan (Malaysia) 2006-2008 Honda Civic sedan (US) 2006-2007 Honda Civic coupe (US)

Overview
- Model code: FA1; FA2; FA3; FA4; FA5 (sedan, North America and China); FD1; FD2; FD3; FD4; FD5; FD6; FD7 (sedan, global); FG1; FG2 (coupé)
- Also called: Acura CSX (Canada); Ciimo 1.8 (China, 2012–2016)
- Production: August 2005 – December 2010 (North America); August 2005 – 2012 (Asia-Pacific); April 2006 – September 2016 (China)
- Model years: 2006–2011
- Assembly: Japan: Suzuka, Mie; United States: East Liberty, Ohio (ELAP); Greensburg, Indiana (HMIN); Canada: Alliston, Ontario (HCM); Turkey: Çayırova, Kocaeli (Honda Türkiye); Brazil: Sumaré; China: Wuhan (Dongfeng Honda); Taiwan: Pingtung; Thailand: Ayutthaya; Malaysia: Alor Gajah; Philippines: Santa Rosa, Laguna; Vietnam: Vĩnh Phúc; India: Greater Noida (Honda India); Pakistan: Lahore (Honda Atlas)
- Designer: Motoaki Minowa and Jiro Ikeda (sedan); Manabu Konaka (coupe)

Body and chassis
- Body style: 2-door coupé (FG1/FG2); 4-door sedan (FA1/FA2/FA3/FA4/FA5, North America and China) (FD1/FD2/FD3/FD4/FD6/FD7, International model)

Powertrain
- Engine: Petrol: 1.6 L R16A1 I4; 1.8 L R18A1 I4; 2.0 L K20Z2/-Z3 I4; 2.0 L K20A I4; Petrol hybrid: 1.3 L LDA-MF5 i-DSI I4 + IMA
- Transmission: 5-speed automatic 5-speed manual 6-speed manual CVT (hybrid)
- Hybrid drivetrain: Parallel hybrid

Dimensions
- Wheelbase: 2,650 mm (104.3 in) (coupé); 2,700 mm (106.3 in) (sedan)
- Length: 4,440 mm (174.8 in) (2006–08 coupé); 4,488 mm (176.7 in) (2006-08 sedan); 4,458 mm (175.5 in) (2009–11 coupé); 4,503 mm (177.3 in) (2009–11 sedan); 4,545 mm (178.9 in) (Ciimo Si Ming)
- Width: 1,750 mm (68.9 in) (coupé); 1,753 mm (69.0 in) (sedan)
- Height: 1,359 mm (53.5 in) (2006–08 coupé); 1,397 mm (55.0 in) (2009–10 coupé); 1,435 mm (56.5 in) (2006-08 sedan); 1,397 mm (55.0 in) (2009-11 sedan)
- Curb weight: 1,260–1,290 kg (2,777–2,844 lb) (FA sedan); 1,190–1,312 kg (2,623–2,892 lb) (FD sedan); 1,179 kg (2,600 lb) (FG DX coupé)

The Civic sedan was sold worldwide, including in some countries in Europe it was sold alongside the European-market Civic hatchback. However, Honda introduced two different styling for different markets, with Asia-Pacific (except China), Africa, Europe and Russia received a version that is identical to Canadian-market Acura CSX. China and the rest of the Americas receive the North American-market Civic sedan, with limited availability of the coupe model in some countries.

It also features a redesigned dashboard incorporating a "two-tier" instrument panel. The upper panel is completely electronic and contains a digital speedometer in the center, with the coolant temperature and fuel displayed as linear segmented indicators on each side. The lower tier, slightly smaller than that of previous generations, has a backlit analog tachometer and the digital odometer and trip computer below it. The gear shift position indicators are to the right of the tachometer in automatic transmission and hybrid models, while the latter also features additional IMA Assist and Charge indicators to the left. Indicator lights are spread over both displays, whose brightness can be adjusted and saved independently (with the headlights on or off).

In the chassis, Honda introduces improvements in three key areas, which are enhanced suspension geometry with larger wheels and tires, a longer wheelbase, and a new generation 4-channel anti-lock braking system (ABS). To improve steering rigidity and reduce friction, the steering gear box was mounted lower. Significant changes to steering angles, bushings, material rigidity, and spring and shock tuning were claimed to result in a more linear suspension movement when cornering. The rear suspension was also reworked, with the multi-link double wishbone rear suspension benefits from a new design that facilitates more rebound stroke and improved positioning of the damper. The improved rebound stroke allows the vehicle to absorb harsh road surfaces better, while also enhancing overall stability.

=== North America ===
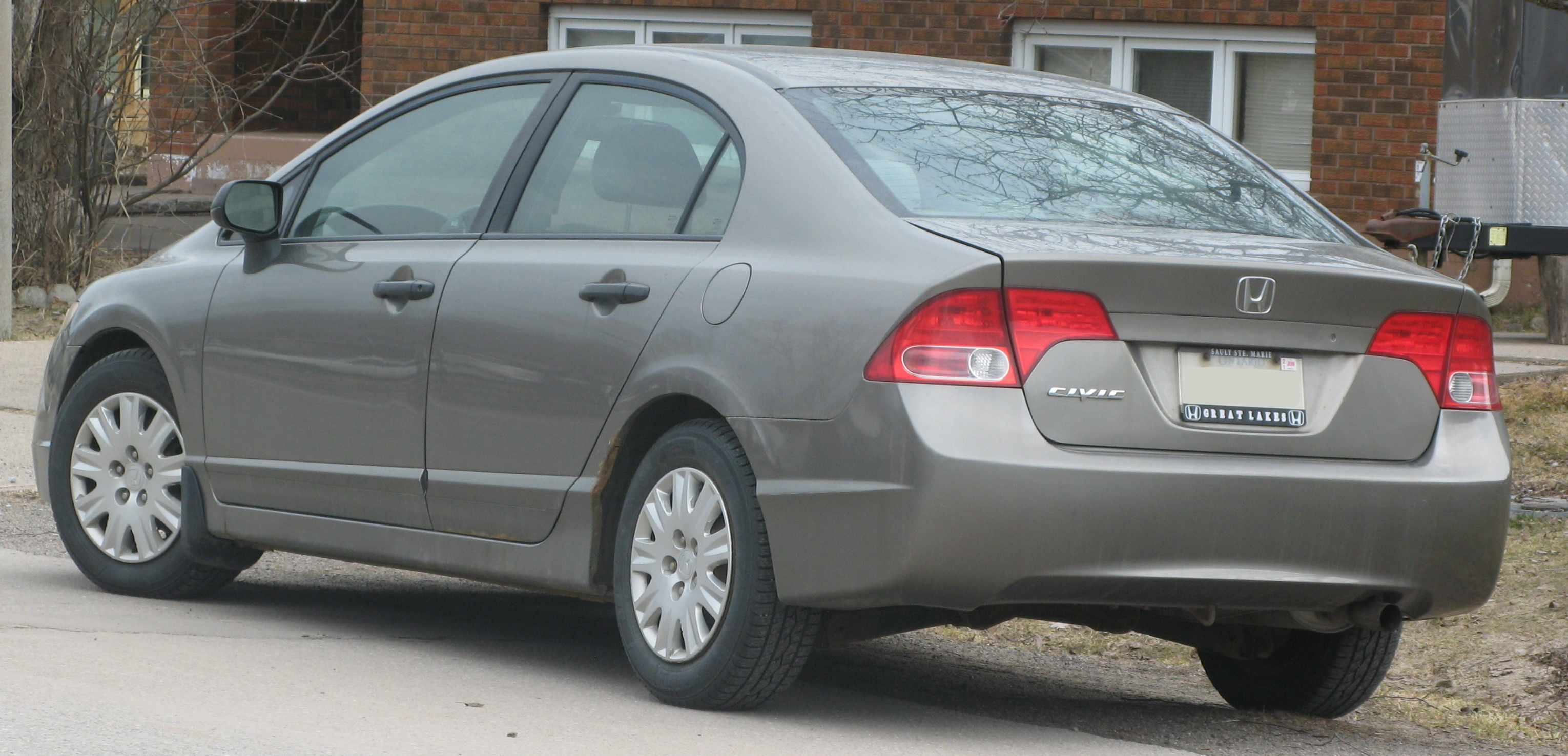
2007 Civic DX sedan (Canada)

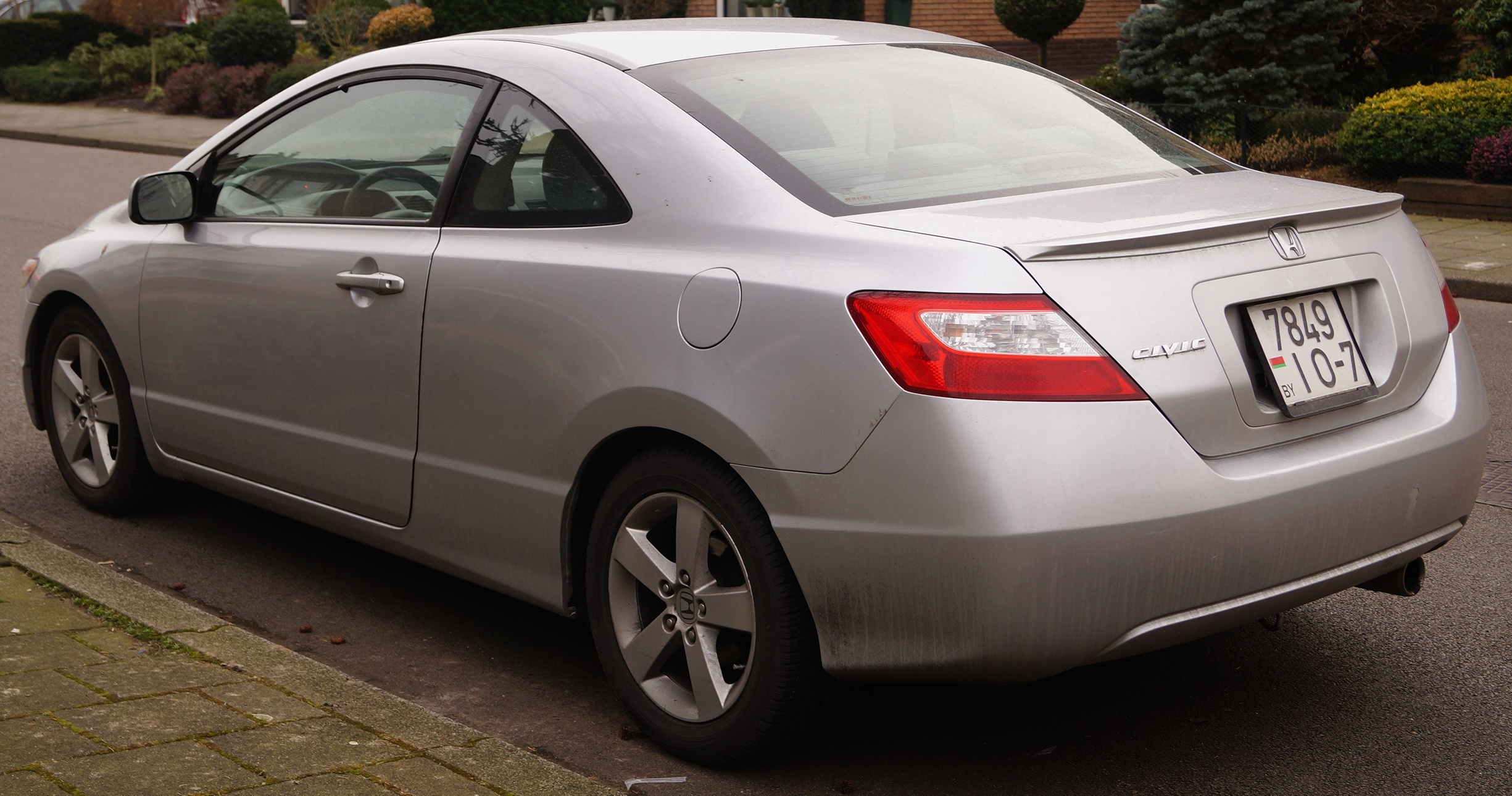
2006–2008 Civic EX coupe (US)

In the North American market, the sedan and coupe styles were available, and were designed in Japan and Ohio respectively. The sedan model was introduced in September 2005 for the 2006 model year. Both the sedan and coupe are introduced in several trim levels (DX/DX-A, VP/DX-G, LX, EX, EX with Navigation, and Si). The hybrid model only comes as a sedan, while the Si coupe was joined by a sedan in 2007, and the Si sedan entered the Canadian lineup in 2008.

The 2008 model year saw the addition of new interior features such as a 60/40 rear folding seat and remote trunk release for LX models (previously only available on EX models), while 2009 models had a mid-generation refresh most notable on the front grille. Additionally, the 2006 models acquired ULEV-2 (Ultra Low Emission Vehicle) certification and boast a more powerful 1.8-litre engine than the 2005 counterparts while retaining almost equal fuel economy. The Civic Si and Civic Hybrid feature a sport-oriented electric power steering, while regular use a speed sensitive hydraulic power steering system.

During the debut of Civic sedan and coupe concepts at the 2011 North American International Auto Show in Detroit, it was announced that more than 1.5 million units of the eighth-generation Civic have been sold since it first went on sale in late 2005. More than 95 percent of all Civics sold in the US as of calendar year 2010 were made in North America at manufacturing facilities in either Greensburg, Indiana or Alliston, Ontario in Canada. Production in East Liberty, Ohio ended early in 2009 to focus on production of Honda crossover models.

==== Trims and models ====
The base DX model is equipped with LATCH, immobilizer theft-deterrent system, power windows, daytime running lights (DRL), 15-inch steel wheels with covers, driver's seat height adjustment, and other features. American DX models do not have a standard audio system, while the Canadian equivalent has a 160 watt 4-speaker AM/FM/MP3 stereo system with CD player. Air conditioning was optional, which is known as DX-A in Canada. The center armrest was also optional, as with the cruise control.

The VP (Value Package) model sold in the United States adds air conditioning and the 160-watt 4-speaker AM/FM/MP3 stereo system with CD player.

The DX-G model sold in Canada adds air conditioning, auxiliary input jack for portable audio players, power door locks, remote keyless entry and storage console armrest. In 2008, it added cruise control,15-inch (380 mm) lightweight alloy wheels (same as the ones on the Civic Hybrid), and a lip spoiler.

The LX model adds a 160 watt 4-speaker AM/FM/MP3 stereo system with CD player (for the US only, all Canadian DX and LX models already include that system), 16-inch steel wheels with covers (5-spoke alloy wheels in Canadian LX models), cruise control, MP3/audio jack, passenger-side walk-in with memory (coupe only), floor mats, and an anti-theft security system with remote entry (US models only). In 2008, the Canadian LX models added features including a lip spoiler, 60/40 rear folding seat, and remote trunk release.

The EX model adds a power moonroof, 4-wheel disc brakes, 16-inch alloy wheels, an additional 12-volt accessory outlet (for a total of two), a 350 watt stereo system with six speakers (coupe only, the sedan EX comes with a 160-watt stereo system), exterior temperature indicator, and a foldable rear arm rest with integrated cupholders (sedan only). This trim was sold in Canada only in the 2006 and 2007 model years, until it was replaced with the LX-SR and EX-L models in 2008.

For the first time on the Civic, a voice-activated navigation system was introduced with the EX with Navigation model.

The 2008 model year introduced the LX-SR (Sunroof) model positioned in between the LX and EX models for the Canadian market, which adds a power moonroof and 4-wheel disc brakes. This model year also introduces leather to the Civic for the first time with the EX-L and EX-L with Navigation models which also adds heated front seats, heated exterior mirrors, leather-wrapped steering wheel, and a center console.

All coupes come standard with a rear lip-spoiler, while EX models have round chrome finish on the exhaust pipe. Coupes are intended to be sportier than their sedan counterparts, they have a more aggressive suspension set up consisting of firmer spring rates and thicker anti-roll bars coupled with adjusted damping settings. Civic models with a moonroof have slightly less interior space due to reduced headroom.

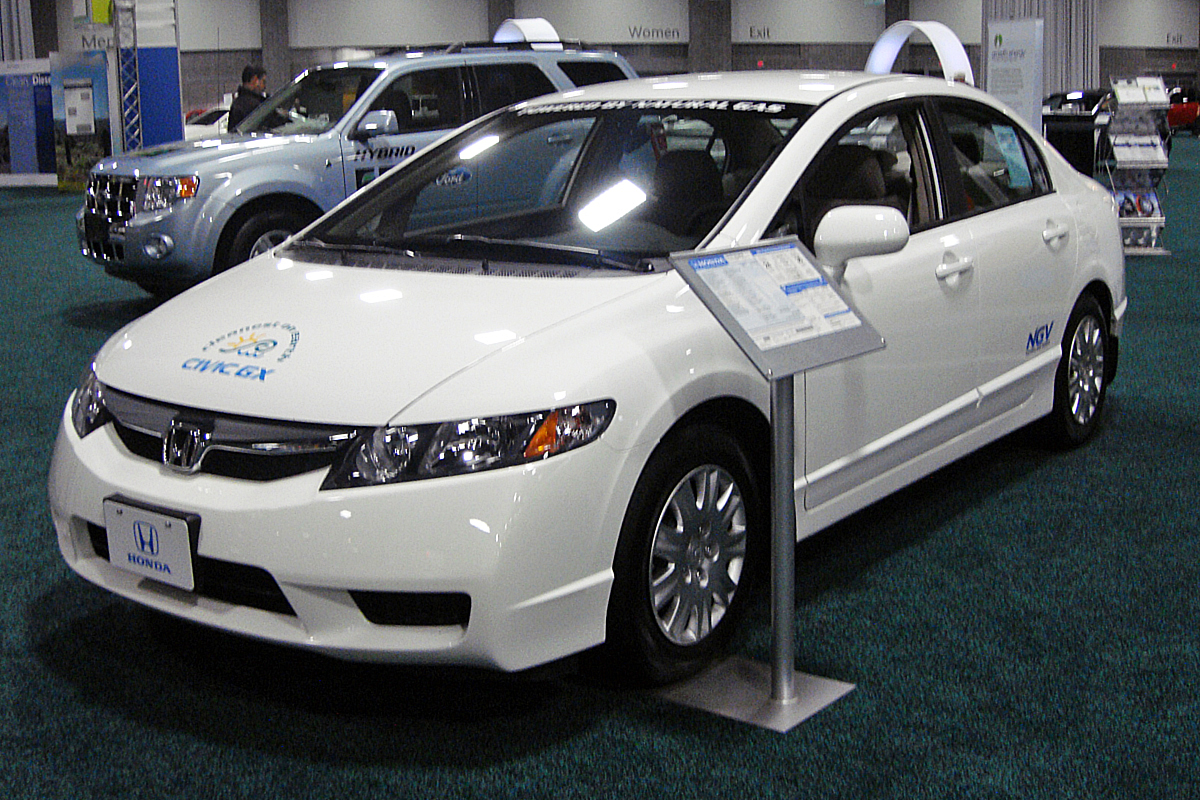

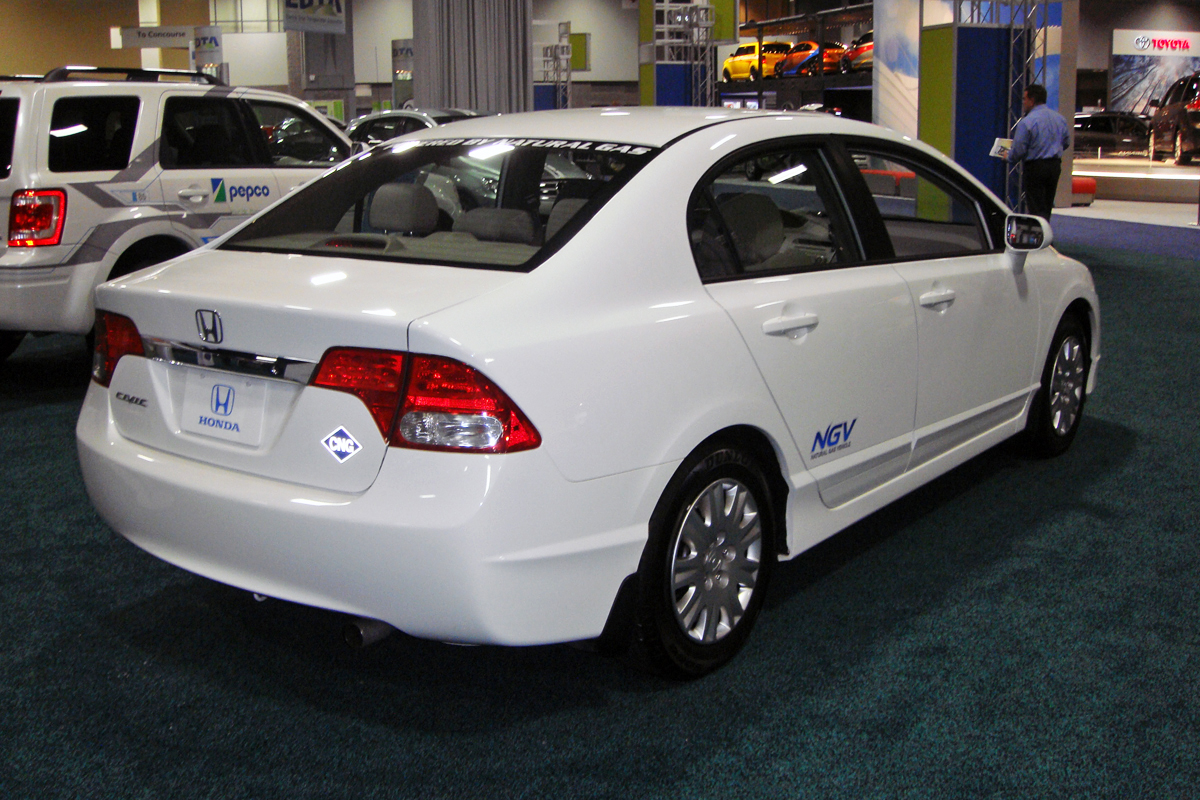
Honda Civic GX

The Honda Civic GX is designed to run on compressed natural gas (CNG). Due to the limitations of the CNG tanks, the 6-speaker stereo system is not installed. The GX also does not have a folding rear seat and has less cargo space.

Only a continuously variable transmission (CVT) was offered for the 2006 Honda Civic Hybrid, which gains more power and a mileage boost to a United States Environmental Protection Agency estimated 40 mpg_{‑US} (5.9 L/100 km; 48 mpg_{‑imp})/45 mpg_{‑US} (5.2 L/100 km; 54 mpg_{‑imp}) (city/highway). It achieves an AT-PZEV emission rating. The 1.3 L L13A i-DSI engine (in Europe marketed as 1.4-litre engine) has been upgraded to achieve 93 hp (69 kW), instead of 83 hp (62 kW) in earlier model. Accompanied by the electric motor with 15 kW (20 hp) which gives in total 110 hp (82 kW) for the Hybrid vehicle. Top speed was rated at 186 km/h (116 mph), CO_{2} emission is 109 g/km and the mass of the car is 2,875 lb (1,304 kg)—light for a car equipped with IMA electric motor and nickel–metal hybrid batteries (5.5 A·h, 158 V).

Both the Civic GX and Civic Hybrid have a similar trim level to the Civic LX, with some differences like 15-inch (380 mm) lightweight alloy wheels, and external mirror lights.

===== Si =====
The car comes with a 2.0-liter K20Z3 i-VTEC engine that produces 197 hp (147 kW; 200 PS) and 139 lbf⋅ft (188 N⋅m) of torque, while including a 6-speed manual transmission with a helical limited-slip differential. 40% stiffer spring and dampening rates from the non-Si trims and stiffer sway bars have bolstered the Civic Si's handling, with the car achieving 0.90g (8.8 m/s^{2}) of lateral acceleration on the skidpad. It was also the quickest Civic Si off the line, with a factory 0–60 time of 6.7 seconds according to Honda. Some new features include a sunroof, a seven-speaker 360-watt sound system, 17-inch alloy wheels with Michelin all-season tires, and keyless trunk access. Brazilian market Si's have a 192 hp (143 kW; 195 PS) version of the K20 engine designated K20Z5.

In Canada, the Acura CSX Type-S was offered in 2007, borrowing the engine and drivetrain from the Civic Si but offering additional luxury options such as leather seating. The CSX features similar front and rear fascias to the JDM Civic, but with slight differences—the CSX has a crease running along the center of the hood and front bumper, whereas the JDM does not.

For the 2008 model year, the Civic Si received minor tweaks that include even darker wheels than the 2007 model and a new shift boot with red stitching. Mechanical changes included a new tire pressure monitor system, a new rear upper arm that decreases the amount of rear camber, and a lowered spring rate for the coupe to match the sedan. This was also the first year the Civic Si Sedan was available in Canada.

Civic Si sedan

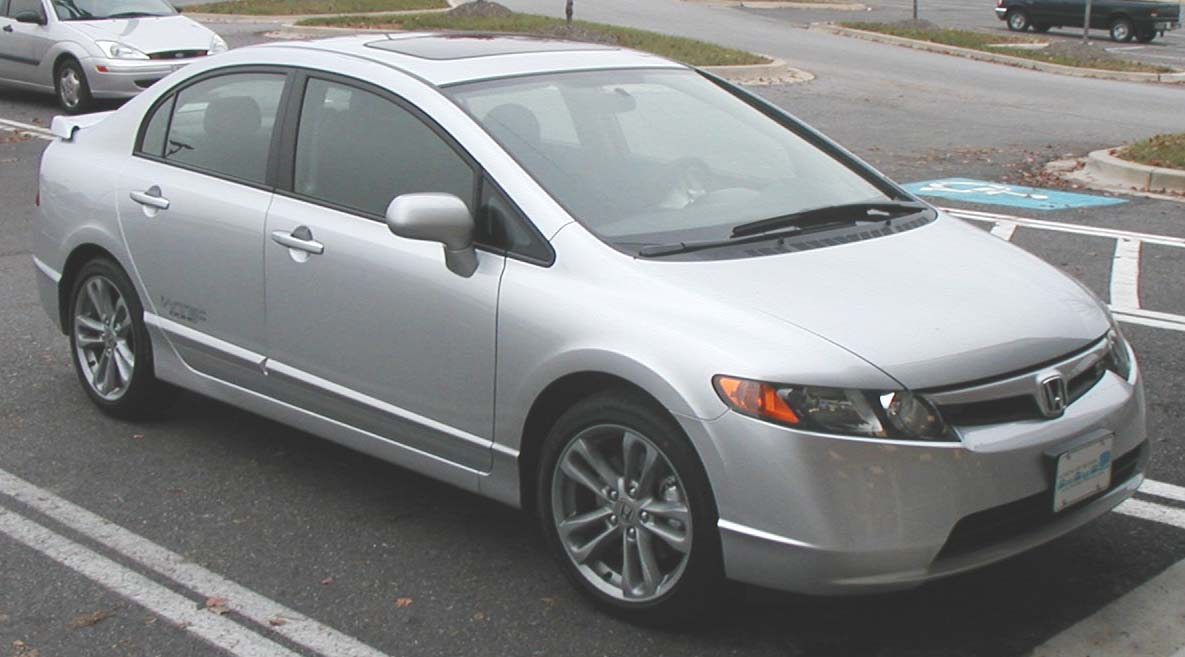

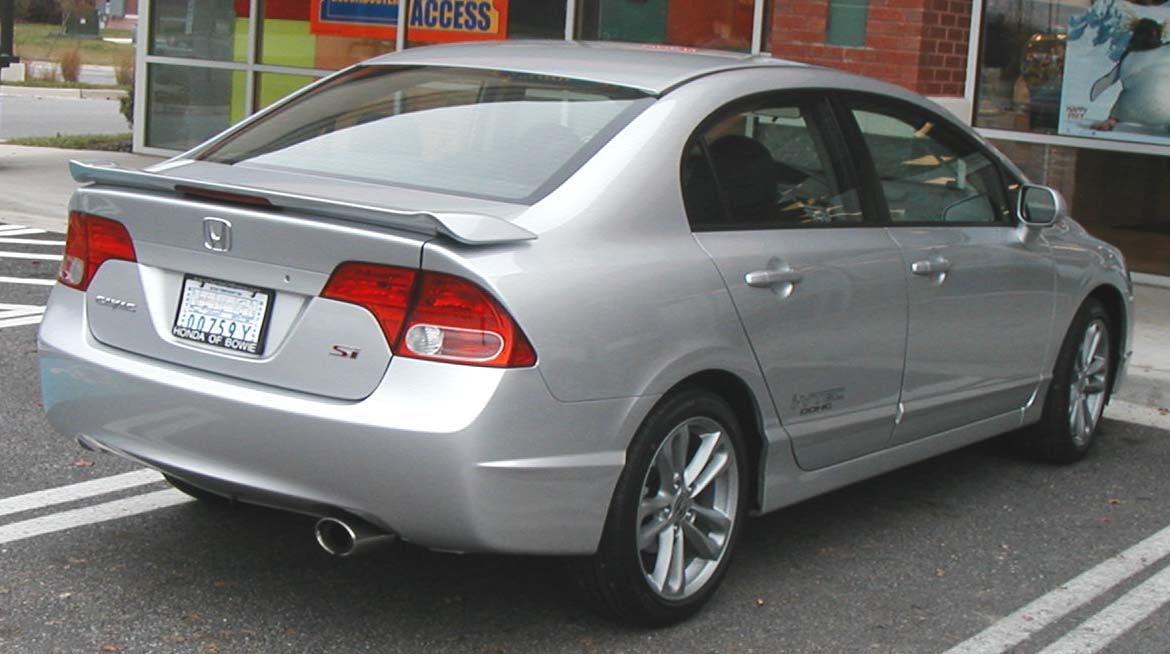
Civic Si sedan

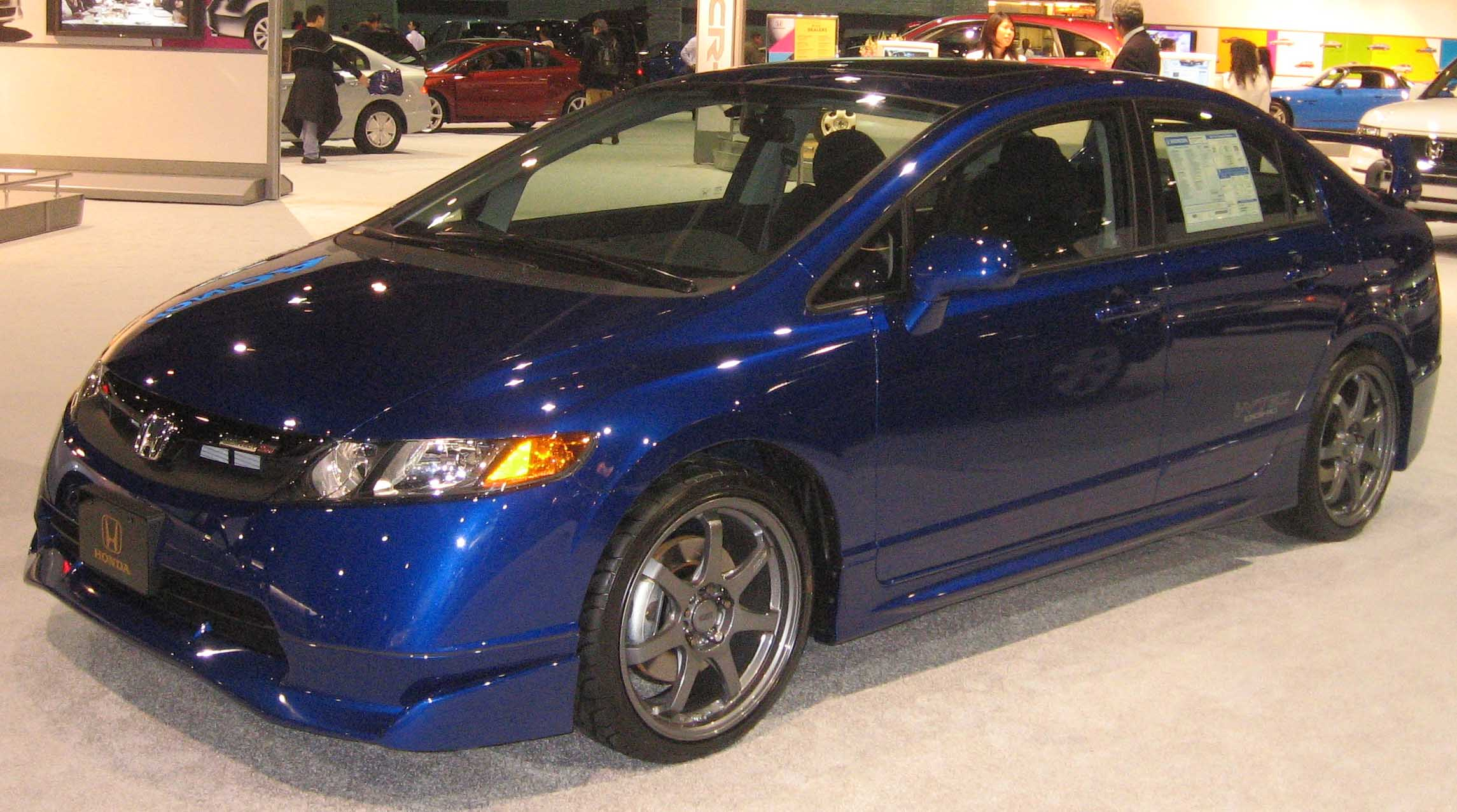
2008 Honda Civic Si Mugen Sedan (FA5 (US); pre-facelift)

Honda introduced the Civic Si sedan for North America in 2007; previously, only the Japanese market had been offered Si sedans. Debuted at the Chicago Auto Show, the Si sedan concept featured larger 18-inch alloy wheels than its coupe counterpart, along with 4-piston Brembo brakes, and large cross drilled brake rotors. The production version lacked such concept accoutrements, and the Si Sedan is mechanically almost identical to the coupe. Performance of the Si sedan is roughly equivalent to the Si coupe; the sedan's 60-pound (27 kg) weight increase is offset by a slightly more balanced front/rear weight distribution (60/40 for the sedan versus 61/39 for the coupe).

Civic Mugen Si sedan

The 2008 model year also brought into production the limited-edition 2008 Civic Mugen Si Sedan, which was announced at the 2007 SEMA Show. The Mugen sedan came only in Fiji Blue Pearl, and featured a higher-flowing cat-back exhaust, track-tested sport suspension, an exclusive Mugen grille, an exclusive shift knob, Mugen Si badges on the exterior and interior, Mugen forged GP wheels, and a Mugen body kit custom designed for the American trim. Production was limited to only 1000 units. Testing by Car and Driver magazine determined that the acceleration of the Mugen Si was roughly equivalent to that of the standard Civic Si coupe.

==== Facelift ====
For the 2009 model year, Civics sold in the North American market received a facelift, introducing the LX-S (Sport) trim for the US market which adds 16-inch (410 mm) alloy wheels from the pre-facelift EX, lip spoiler, steering-wheel cruise controls, and black sport upholstery with silver stitching. The Canadian LX-SR trim was renamed the Sport and has added features such as black sport upholstery with silver stitching, chrome exhaust finisher, and leather-wrapped steering wheel. These amenities were not added to the coupe which remained as the LX-SR. Out of the two Navigation trims, EX with Navigation and EX-L with Navigation, only the leather-trimmed navigation trim is retained, as the facelift discontinues the former.

For the sedan exterior, the front bumper and grille were restyled and the bar above the rear license plate is chromed, while the coupe received a new front bumper and grille both reminiscent of previous Civic coupe generations. The sedan's taillights now use transparent lenses with amber bulbs for the turn signals, rather than red lenses. For the interior, the sedan's steering wheel was changed from a two-spoke design to use the coupe and Si model's three-spoke design.

Changes for the 2009 Si also included a revised front bumper and grille, turn signals with clear-lenses and amber bulbs for the front and rear, a clear instead of red third brake light in the rear spoiler, and chrome trunk trim for the sedan. The 2010 Civic Si saw no significant changes, save for a black engine cover rather than silver.

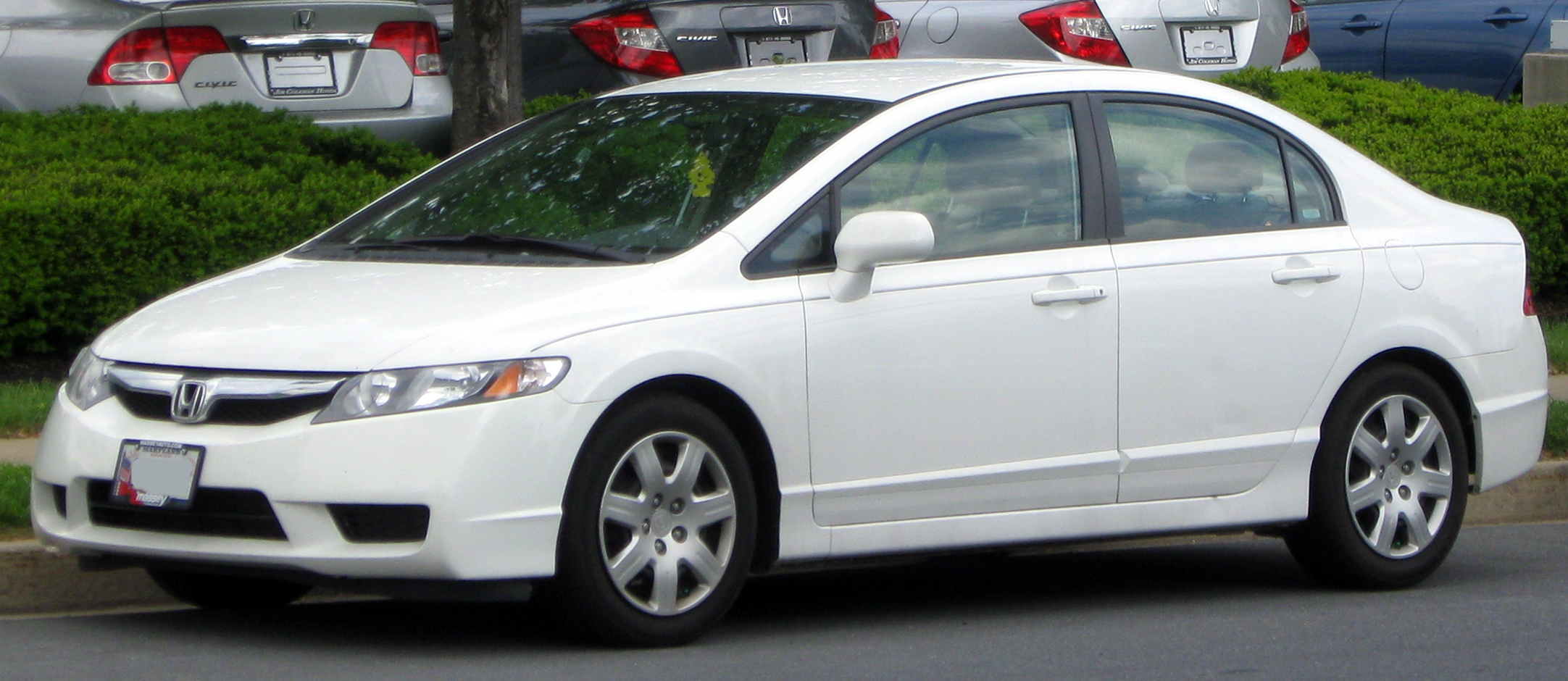
2009 Honda Civic LX sedan (facelift, US)

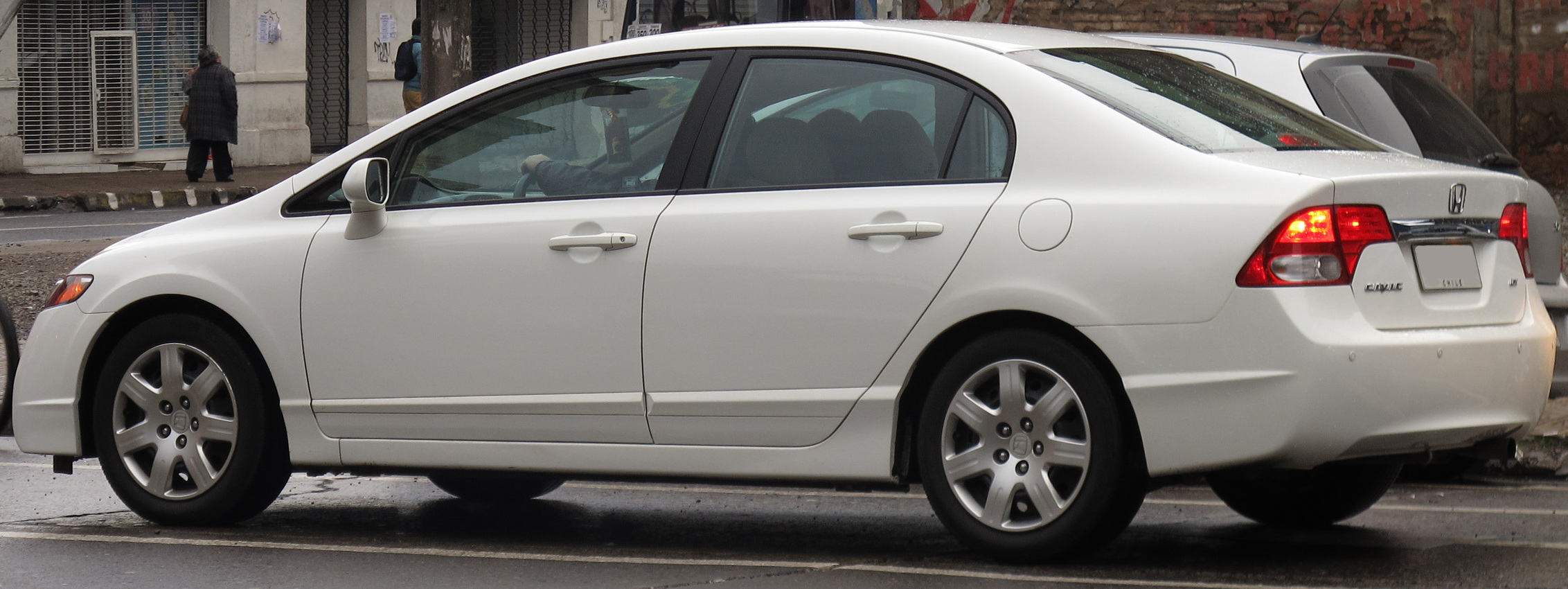
2010 Honda Civic LXS sedan (facelift, rear)

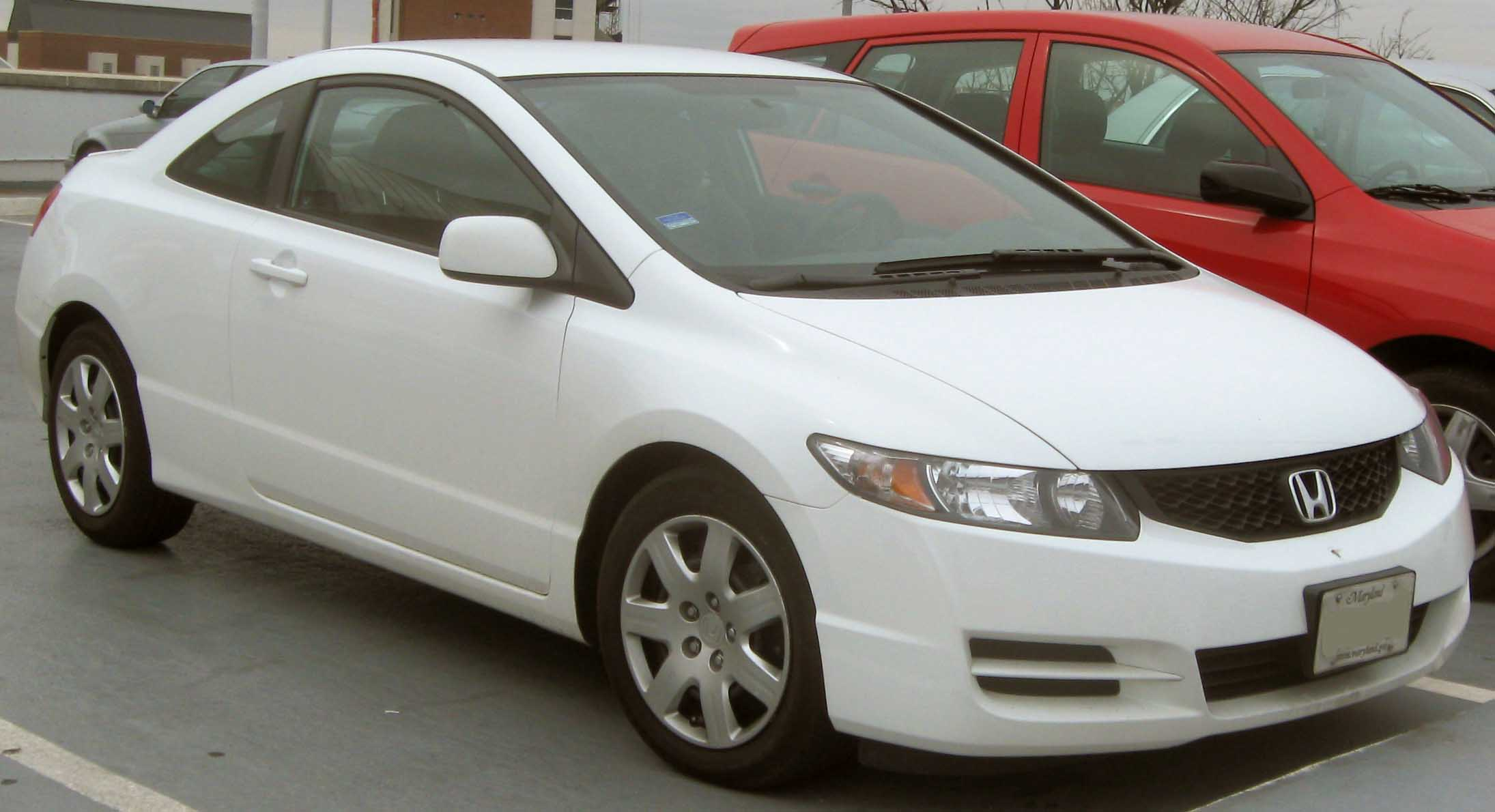
2009 Honda Civic LX coupe (facelift, US)

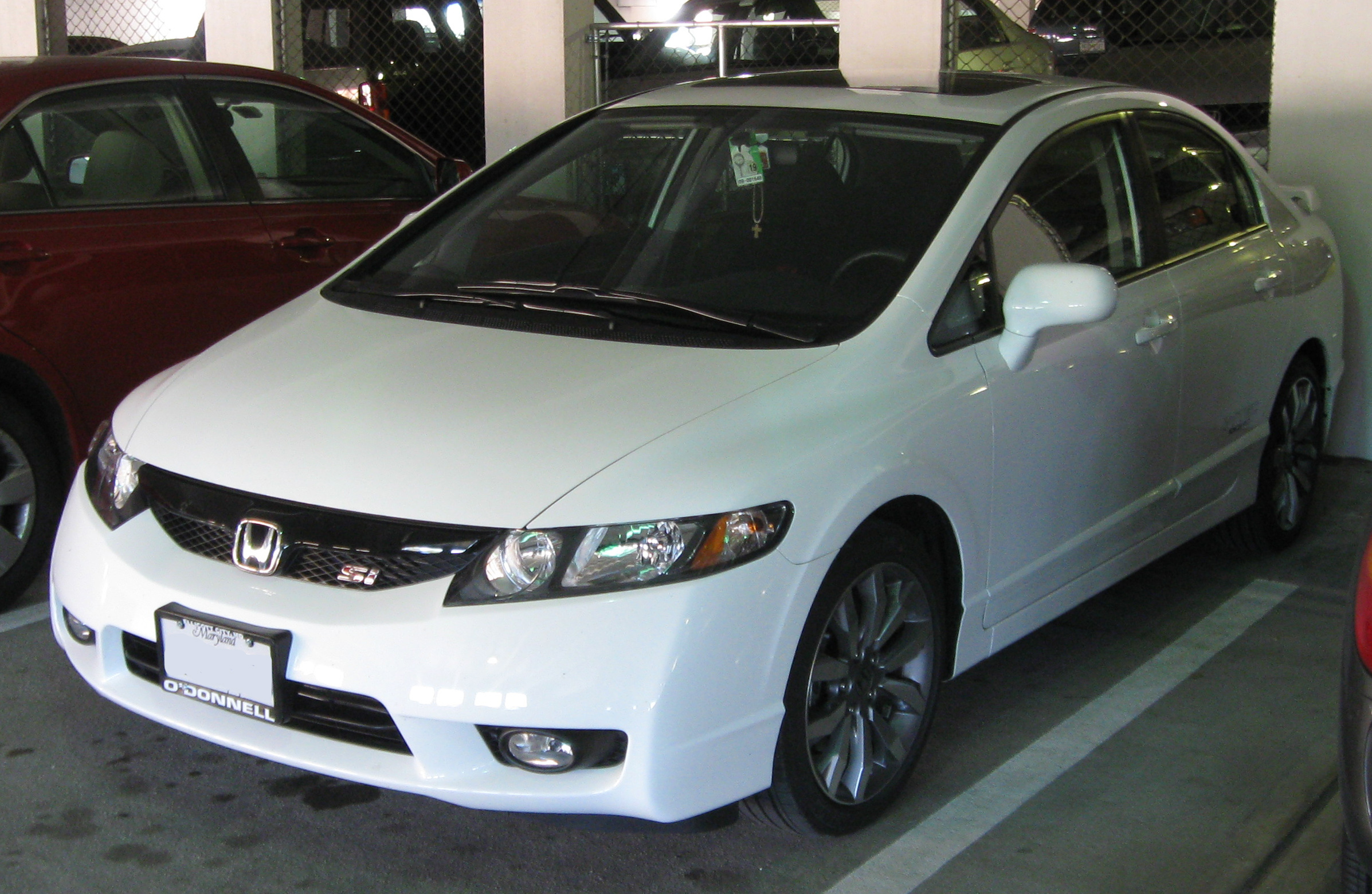
2009 Honda Civic Si Sedan (FA5; facelift, US)

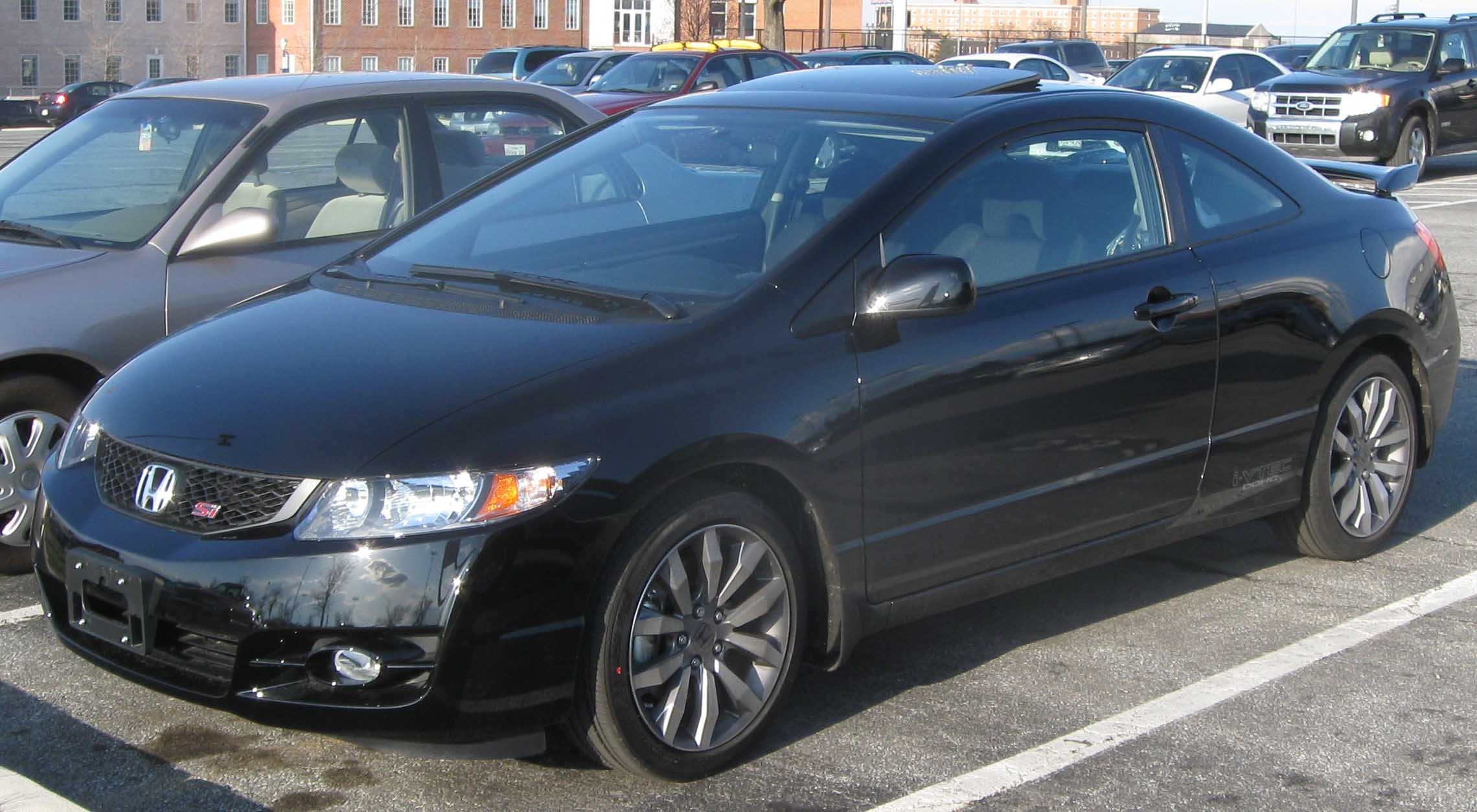
2009 Honda Civic Si Coupe (FG2; facelift, US)

==== Award and recognition ====
- 2006 North American Car of the Year
- Motor Trend 2006 Car of the Year award
- 2006 Automotive Journalists Association of Canada (AJAC) Car of the Year

=== South America ===
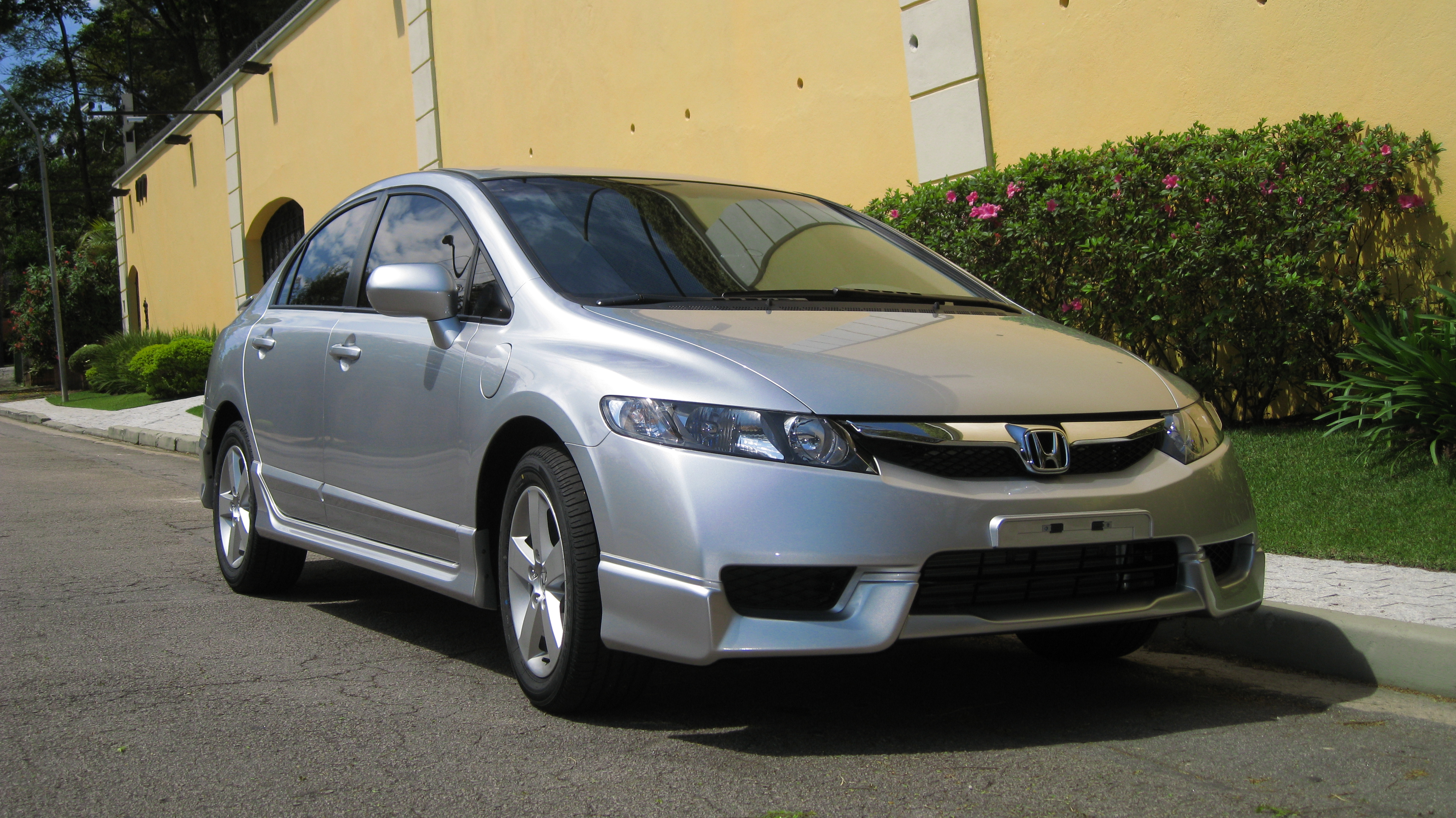

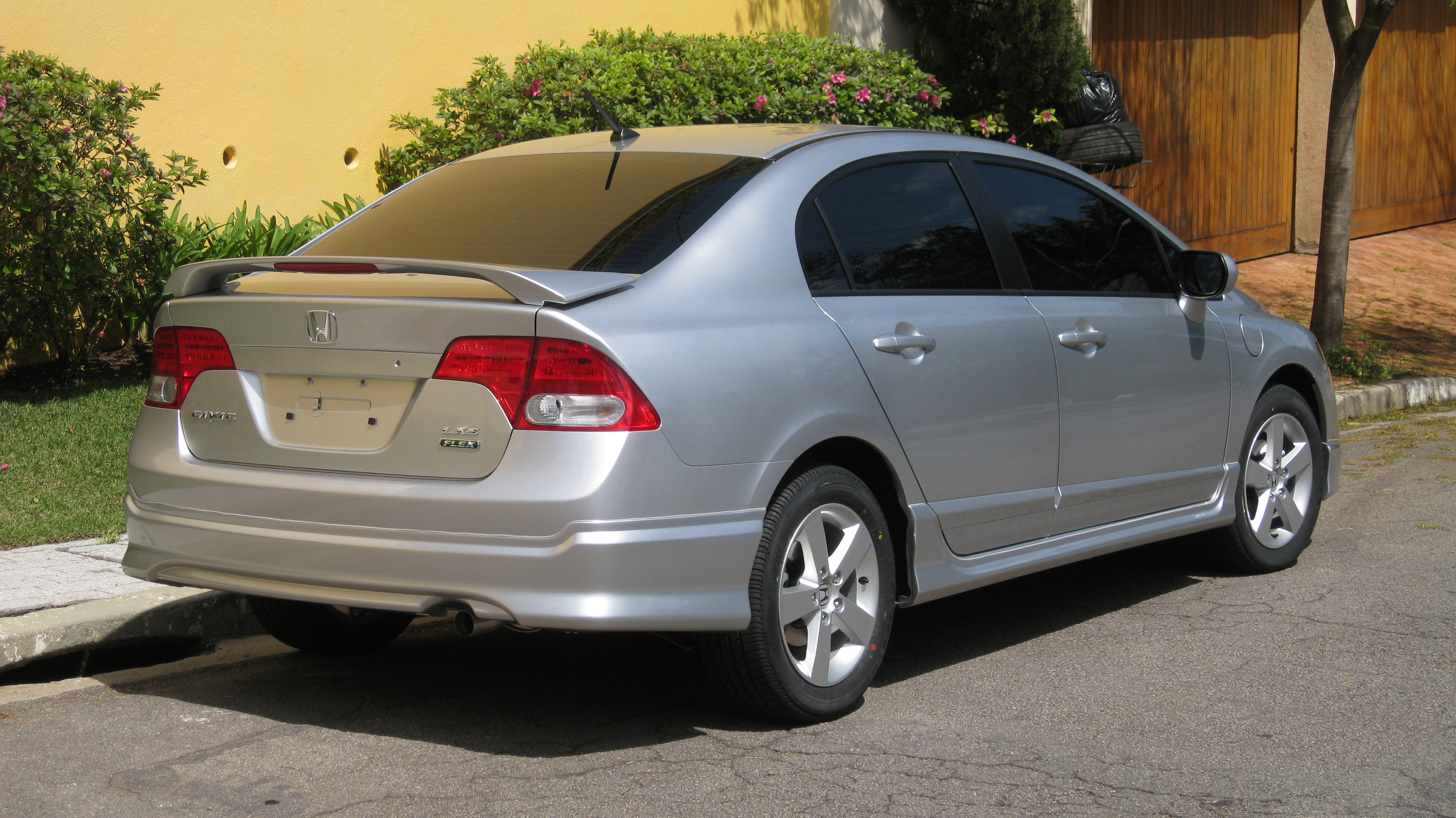
Honda Civic (Brazil)

For the Brazilian market, the eighth-generation Civic was available only with a sedan body, and it is externally almost identical to the American version, having different bumpers and a higher ground clearance. It was available in two trim levels. The LXS and EXS levels are equipped with the 1.8 L i-VTEC SOHC engine generating 140 PS (103 kW). Both models might be equipped with a 5-speed manual or a 5-speed automatic transmission, but only the EXS has the paddle shift controls on the steering wheel. A special trim level for handicapped individuals (LX), based on the LXS, was available in the first year but due to some changes in tax-break laws it's no longer available. It was equipped with automatic transmission and limited to 125 PS (92 kW). The 2006 Civic received the "Best Buy" award from Quatro Rodas magazine.

The Si sedan was announced at Salão do Automóvel in São Paulo, featuring a 2.0 L i-VTEC DOHC at 192 PS (143 kW) (195 PS (145 kW) when using premium unleaded gasoline). For the 2007 model, Honda introduced a new flex fuel version, featuring the same 1.8 L engine, having 140 PS (103 kW) when running only on ethanol or 138 PS (101 kW) when running on gasoline. Argentina, Uruguay and Chile also receive Brazilian models. Peru previously received the Brazilian model, however it later it received the North American model.

=== China ===
Dongfeng Honda assembled and marketed the eighth-generation Civic in China from April 2006. Its exterior is the same as the North American-market Civic, except with amber tail turn lights and only the sedan model was available. It is equipped with a 1.8-liter i-VTEC engine.

In April 2012, Dongfeng Honda relaunched the model as the Ciimo 1.8 (some sources uses name Ci Ming). The Ciimo 1.8 differs from the previously sold Civic by adopting a front and rear end inspired by the Japanese market model, as a result, it is slightly longer. It comes with a 1.8-litre i-VTEC engine, with either a five-speed manual or five-speed automatic transmission. Production was discontinued in 2016.

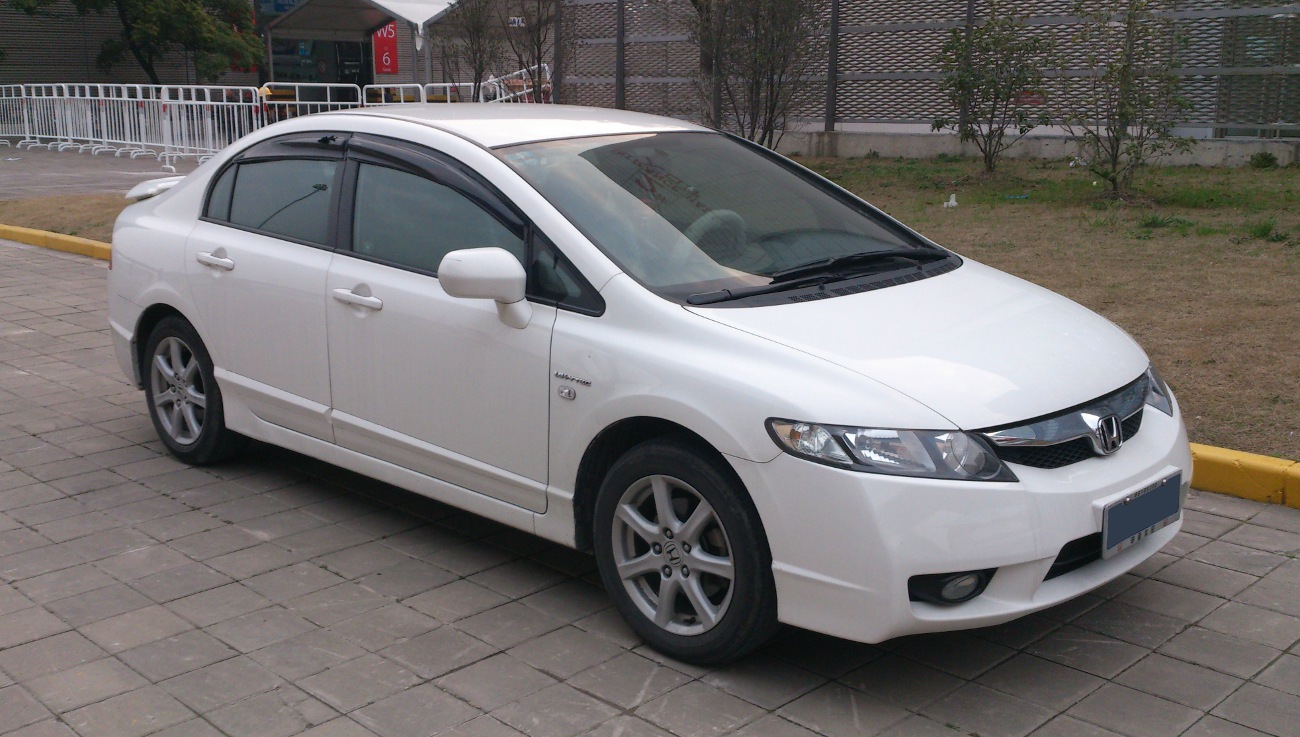
Civic sedan (China; facelift)

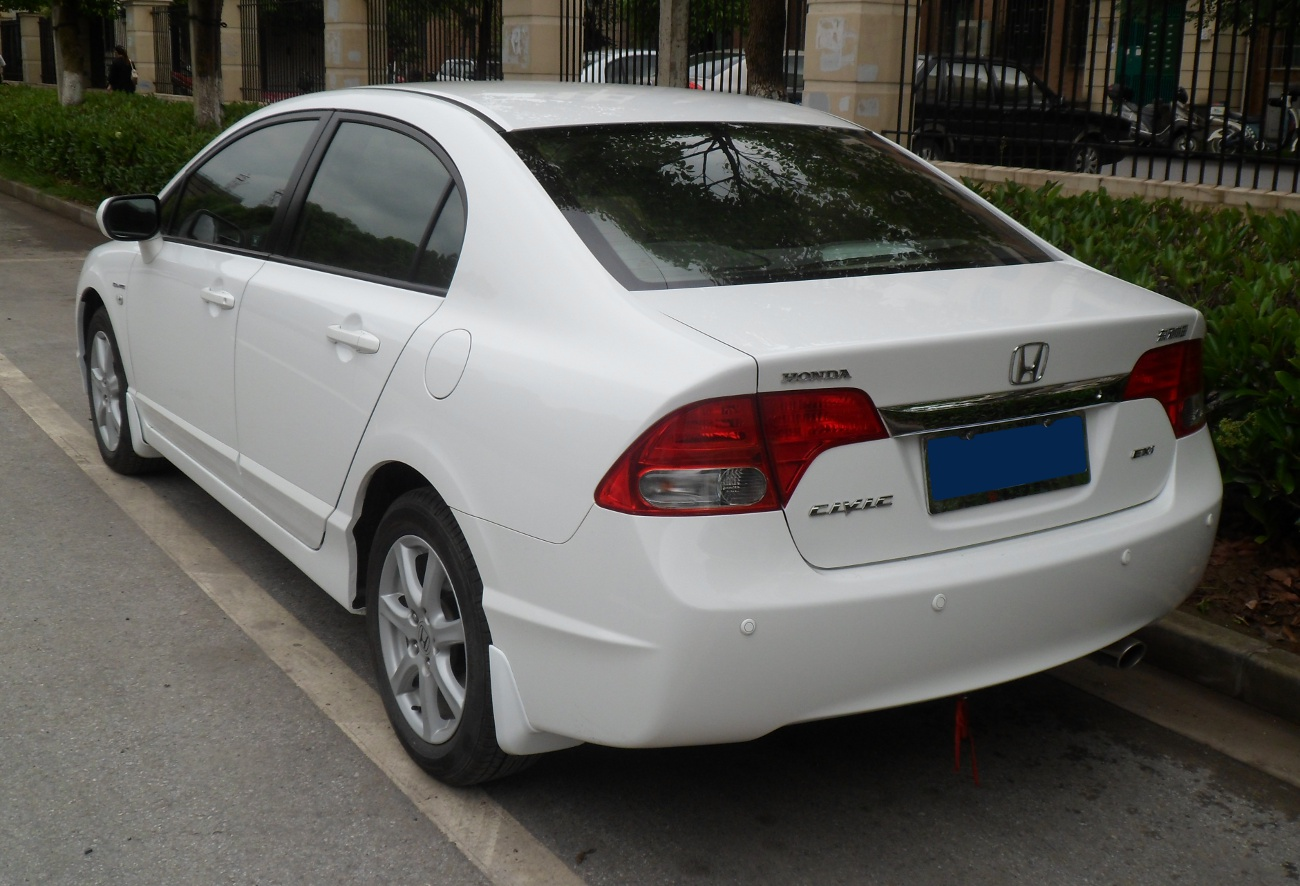
Civic sedan (China; facelift)

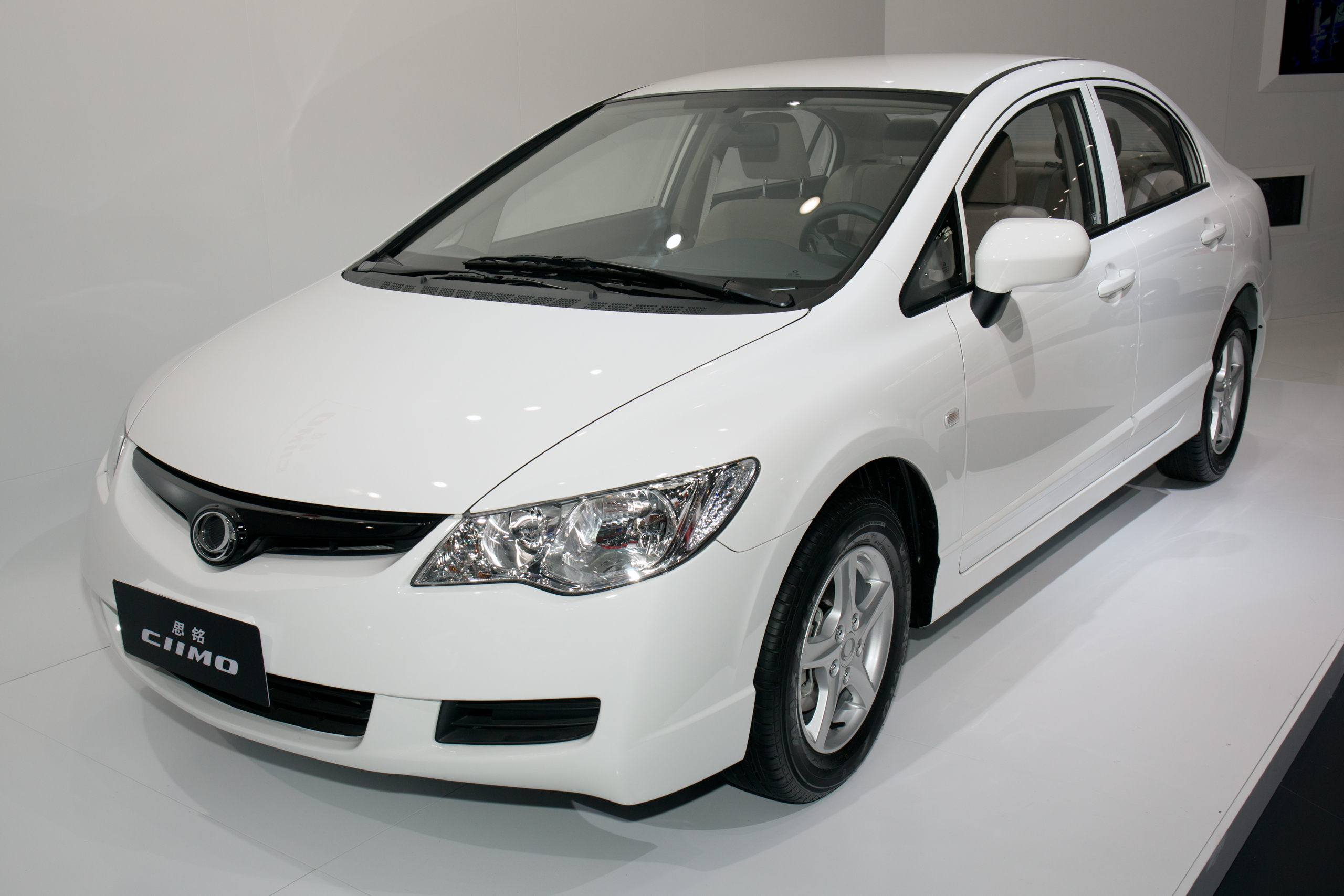
Ciimo 1.8

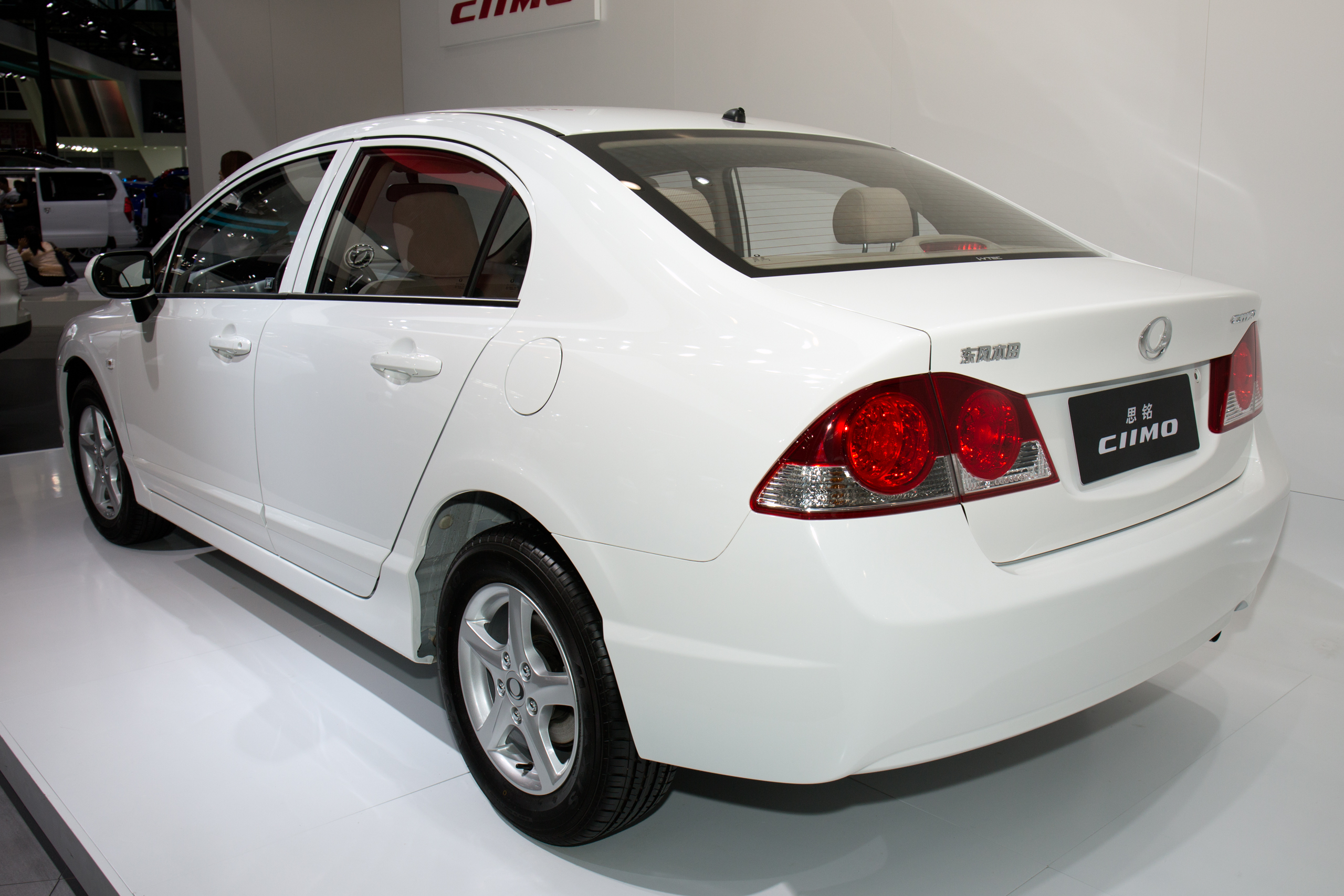
Ciimo 1.8

=== Asia, Australasia, South Africa and Europe ===
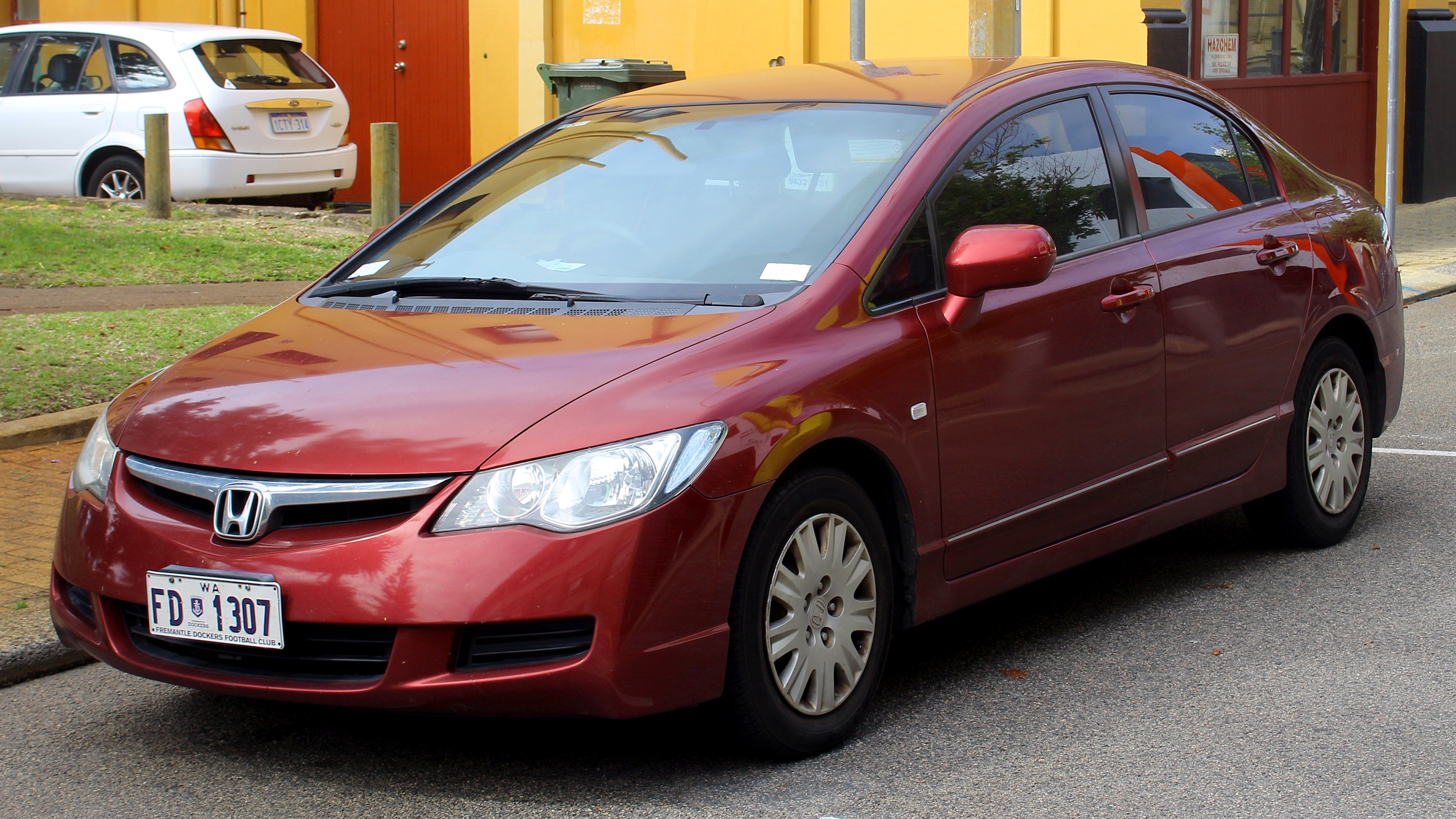

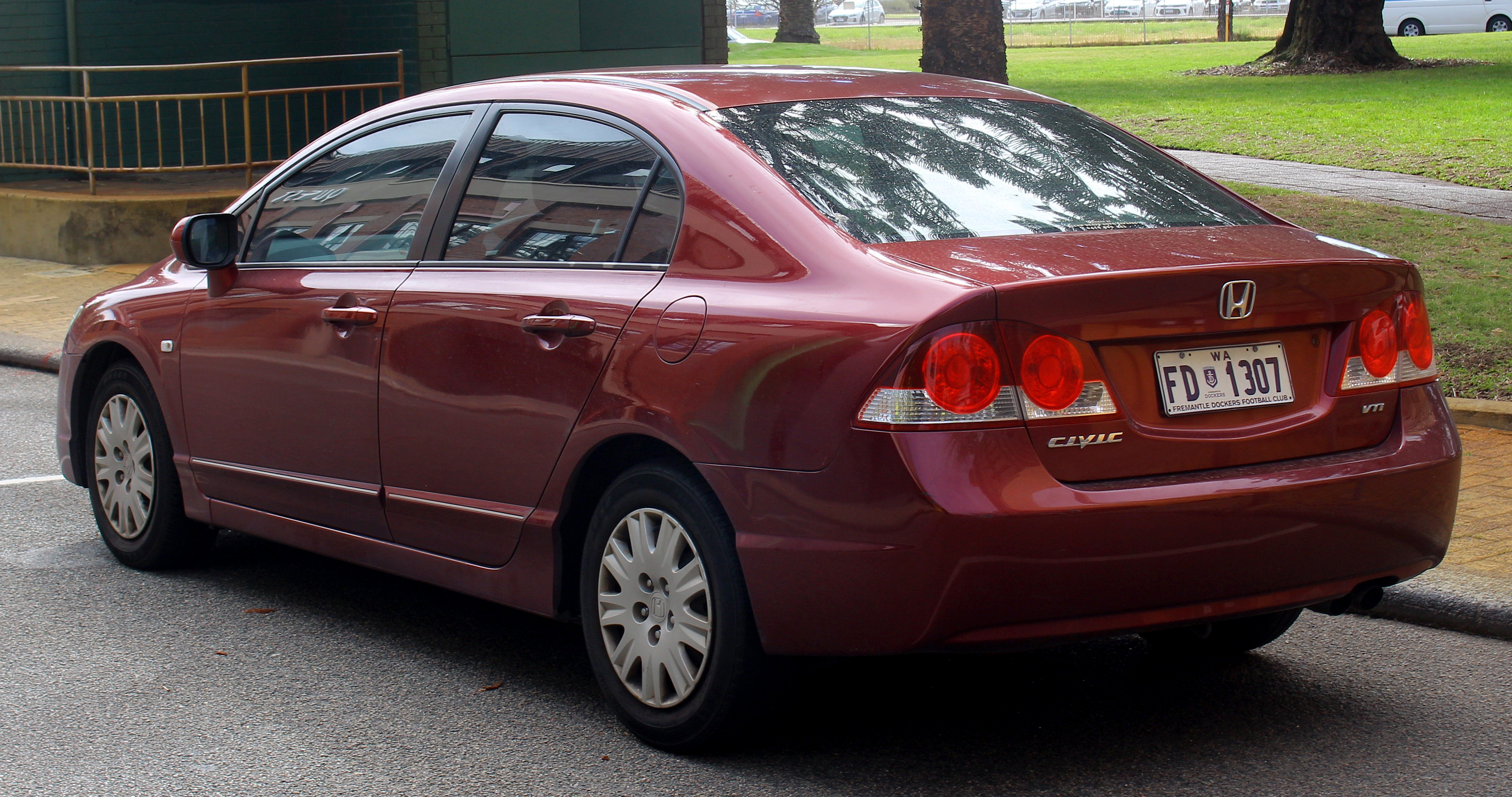
Honda Civic VTi sedan (Australia; pre-facelift)

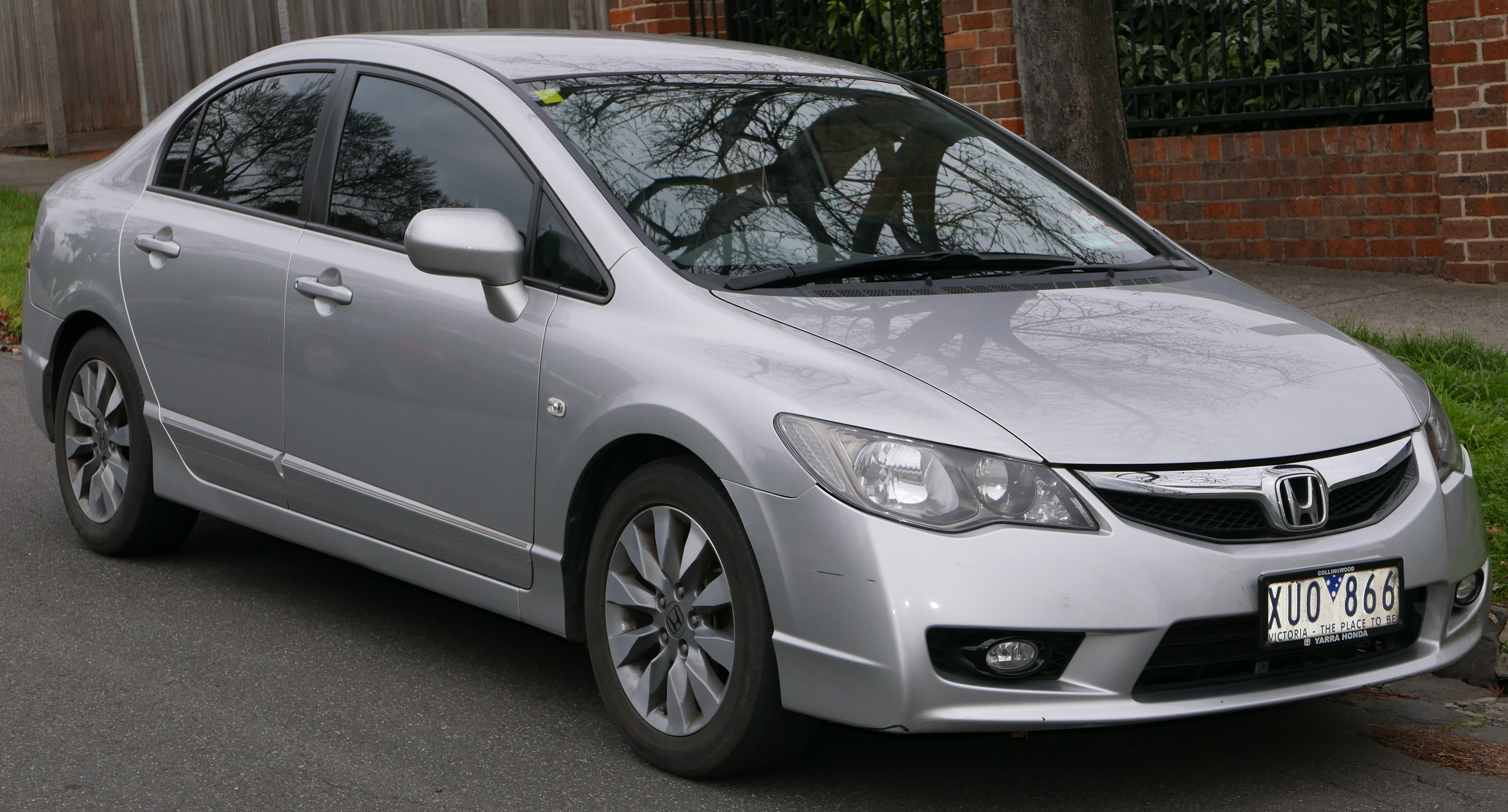

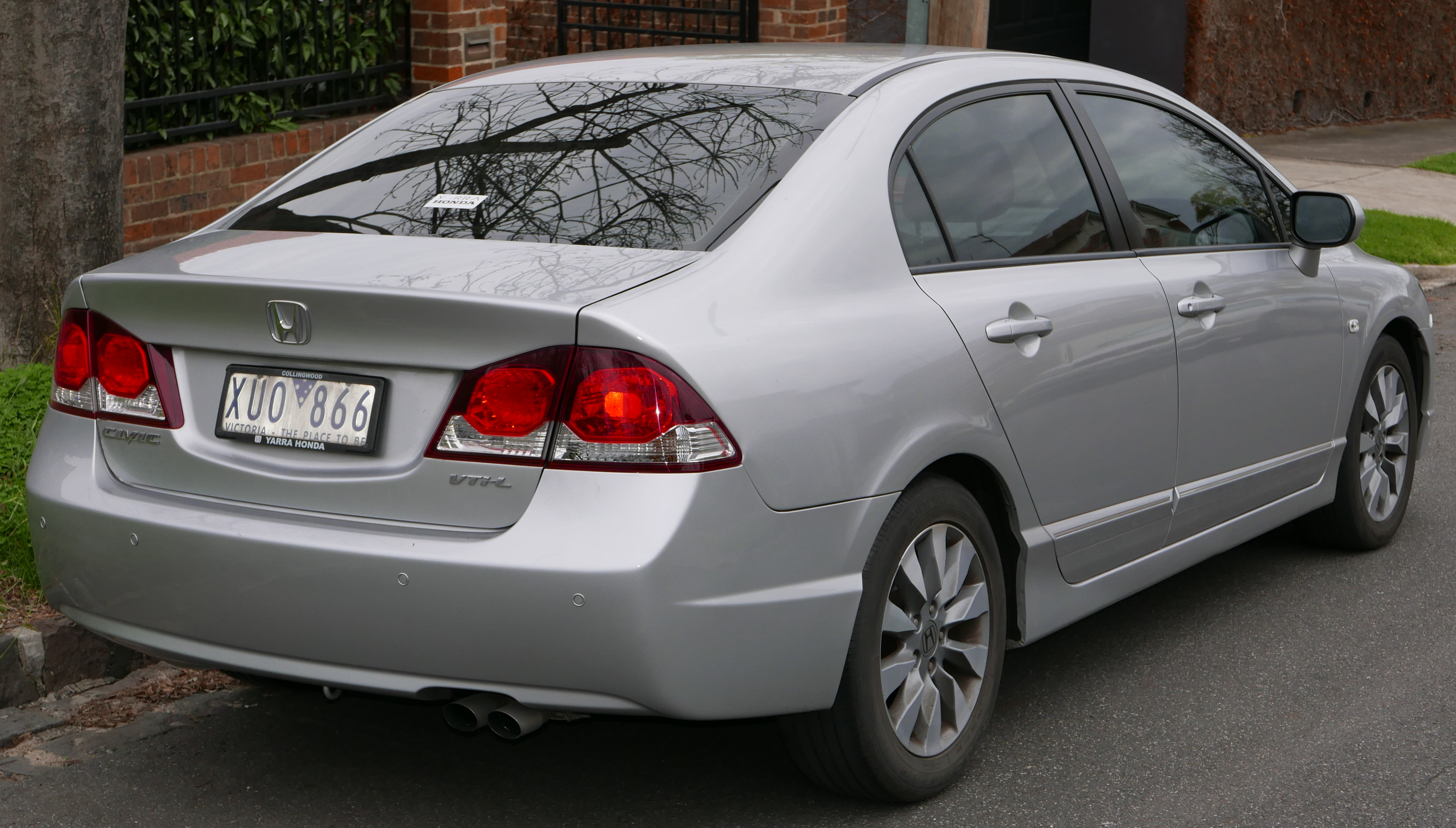
Honda Civic VTi-L sedan (Australia; facelift)

Outside the Americas and China, the eighth-generation Civic has styling differences. While the arcing line sweeping across the front fascia is retained, the main headlights dip away from the main arc for a more sporty appearance. The front bumper also has more vents with a steeper angle and sharper corners than the American-market Civic. Meanwhile, the taillights are more reminiscent of the Integra, with the main round brake lights dipping slightly down into the indicators. On the interior side, the Asian-market Civic has contrasting two tone colour scheme. The three-spoke steering wheel from the American Civic Si and the European hatchback is standard.

The Asia-Pacific-market Civic is a rebadged Acura; Honda Japan claimed the company chose the Canadian-designed Acura CSX as the template for the Asia-Pacific Civic. In Canada, the Acura CSX has features and options not available to American Civics, such as a 2.0 L DOHC i-VTEC engine rated at 155 hp (116 kW), chrome door handles, paddle shifters, and high-intensity discharge headlights. Due to the width dimensions exceeding Japanese government regulations for exterior dimensions, the Civic was no longer regarded as a "compact" sedan in Japan, which has been passed onto the smaller Fit Aria for the compact sedan segment.

Engines include a 1.8-litre SOHC i-VTEC (R18A) engine that produces 140 bhp (104 kW; 142 PS) (130bhp for indian markets) at 6300 rpm (7150rpm fuel cutoff) and a 2.0-litre DOHC i-VTEC (K20Z2) engine that produces 155 bhp (116 kW; 157 PS) at 6200 rpm, both are mated to either a 5-speed manual or 5-speed automatic (with paddle shifting available on the 2.0 L model) with drive by wire throttles. A 1.6-litre variant was offered in Singapore and Turkey. With the displacement being under 1,600 cc, the variant complies with the vehicle numbers curbing system in Singapore, while maintaining a higher standard than the 1.3-litre variant. It uses an SOHC i-VTEC engine, similar to that of the 1.8-litre variant. It produces 123 bhp (92 kW; 125 PS) at 6500 rpm. The hybrid version is equipped with the 1.3-litre SOHC i-VTEC with the IMA (Integrated Motor Assist).

==== Markets ====
In certain European countries, the four-door Civic sedan was available with the hybrid powertrain, being the only version of this Civic available in the UK.

In Japan, the Civic is offered in 1.8L and 2.0L engine options, with variants such as 1.8G, 1.8GL, 1.8S and 2.0GL, with 5-speed Automatic transmissions and 5-Speed manual only for the 1.8H variant.

The South Korean market has three trim levels, 1.8, 2.0, and Hybrid. All Civic models are equipped with 5-speed Automatic transmissions, with the exception of the hybrid model which uses a CVT.

In Taiwan, this generation of Civic was more inline with the JDM model, and was produced domestically since 2006. The Civic sedan was offered in 2 powertrains; the entry-level is powered by a 1.8 liter engine, producing 140 bhp (104 kW; 142 PS) at 6300 rpm, and mated to either a 5-speed automatic transmission. The more powerful 2.0 liter engine produces 155 bhp (116 kW; 157 PS) at 6000 rpm.

In the Philippines, the Civic was launched in April 2006 and offered in 3 grades; the entry-level 1.8 V, 1.8 S and 2.0 S. The FD generation's total sales would eventually exceed its nearest competitor, the Toyota Corolla Altis.

In Pakistan, the Civic was offered in four grades including 1.8 i-VTEC, Prosmatec 1.8 i-VTEC, Oriel 1.8 i-VTEC and Oriel Prosmatec 1.8 i-VTEC., both versions are powered by a 1.8-litre SOHC i-VTEC engine, offered with manual or automatic transmissions. The Prosmatec was only offered with automatic transmission and the Oriel grade came with sunroof, alloy wheels, leather seat covers and other added features.

The Indonesian market was offered in only two models, 1.8 and 2.0. The 1.8 was available in both manual (5-speed) and automatic (5-speed) transmissions. Both 1.8 and 2.0 automatic transmission has a paddle shifting, unlike the others for the Asian market.

In Hong Kong, the right-hand drive Civic (FA1) was made in Japan but shares its exterior with the North American-market Civic. Two models (1.8 Deluxe and 1.8 VTi) are sold, sharing the same engine (R18A) with minor differences in appearance and equipment, e.g. side mirror turn signal light, side airbags and cruise control. In the facelift model, the more expensive VTi model comes with paddle shifters.

In Malaysia, the eighth-generation Civic was first launched in March 2006 and then facelifted in March 2009. In July 2010, a 1.8S-L variant was introduced. Prior to this, only two variants were offered: 1.8S and 2.0S.

In Singapore, the Civic was first launched in March 2006, initially with two engine options, 1.8L and 2.0L, with variants such as the base VTI (with two tone leather seats), mid VTI-S (with paddle shifters, steering wheel controls, turn signals on mirrors) and the top 2.0L SI variant. Later in end 2007, the base 1.8L VTI variant was replaced with a 1.6L engine model. In 2008, base and mid models were updated with 15” inch front discs. A 1.3L hybrid model was also launched at the same time.

=== Hybrid ===
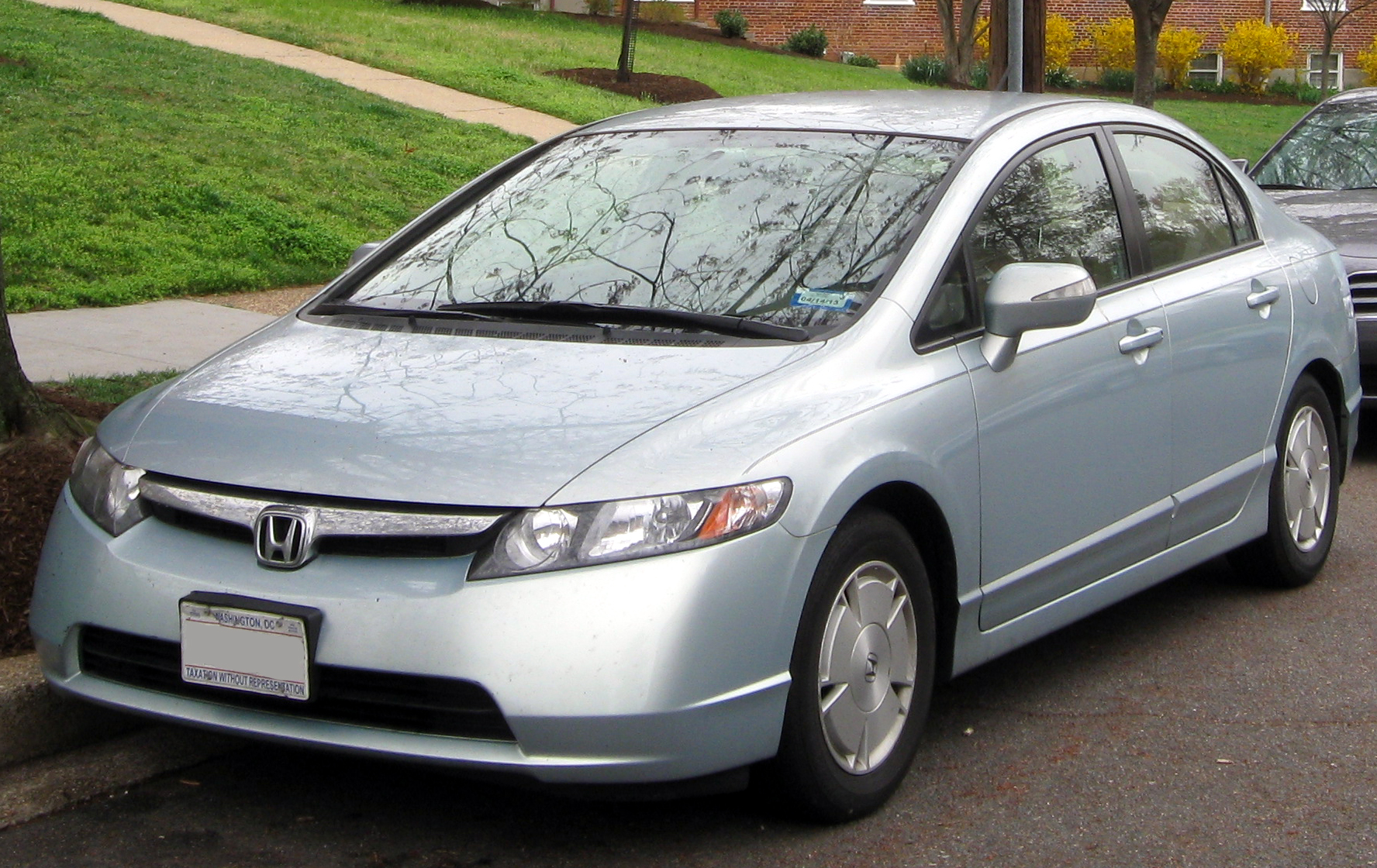
2006–2008 Honda Civic Hybrid (FA3, US)

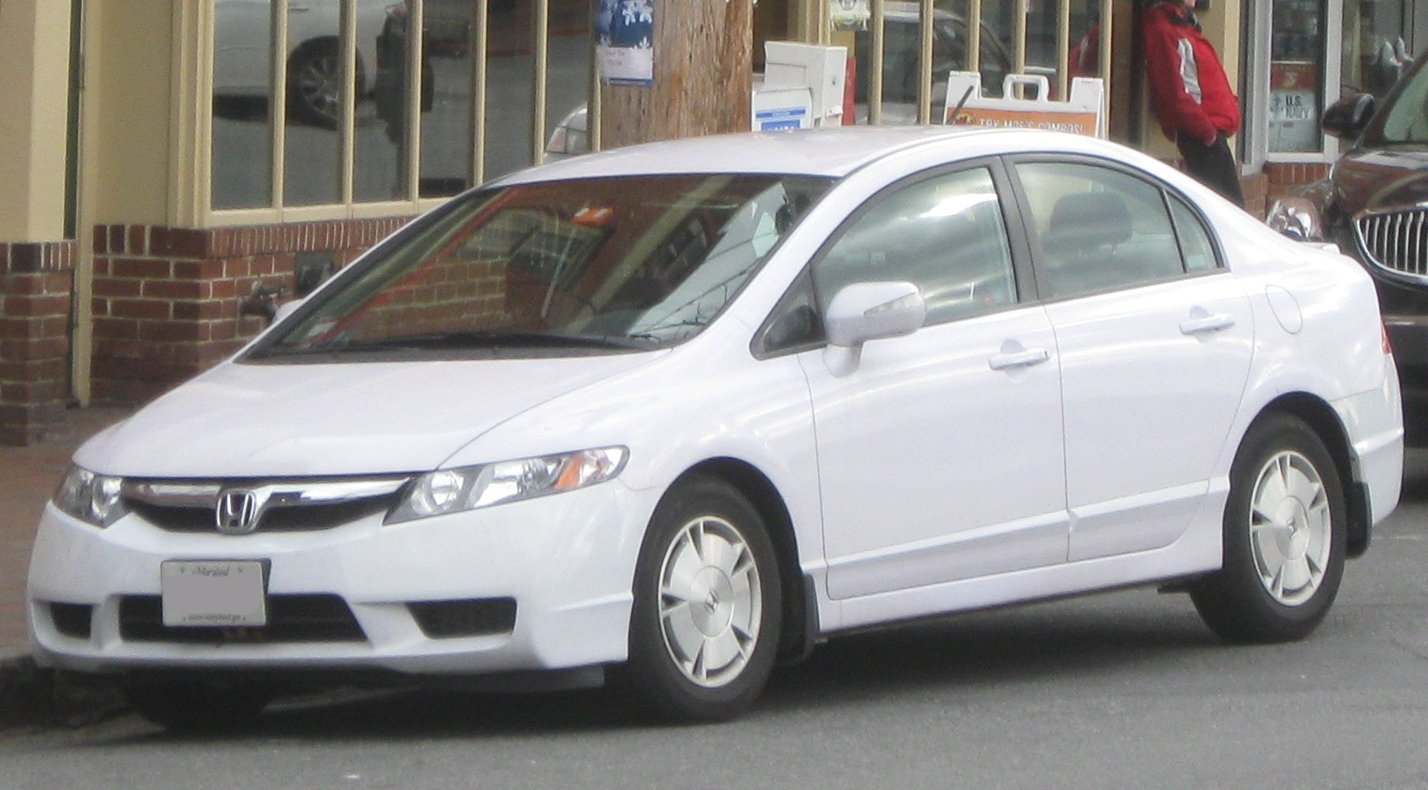
2009–2011 Honda Civic Hybrid (FA3, US)

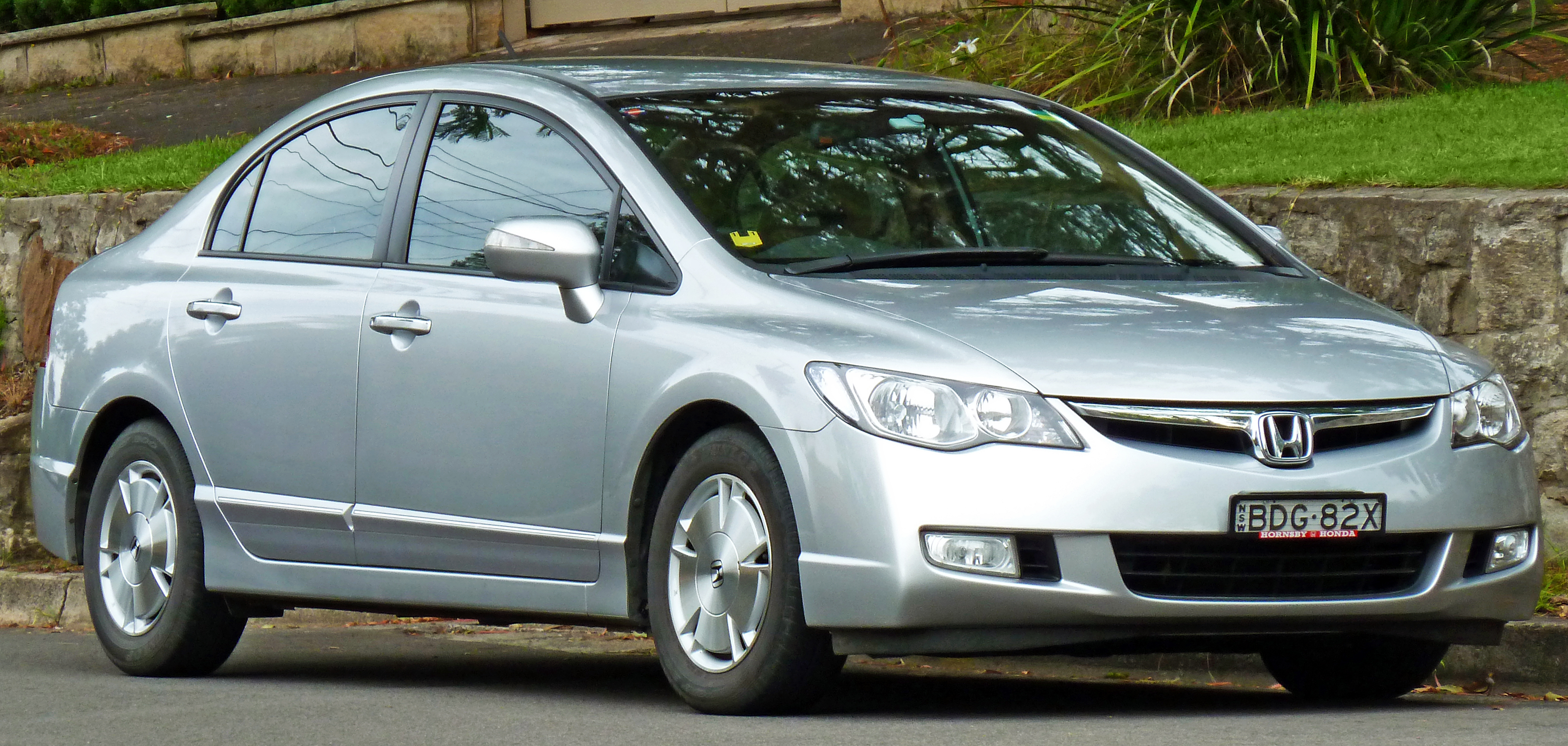

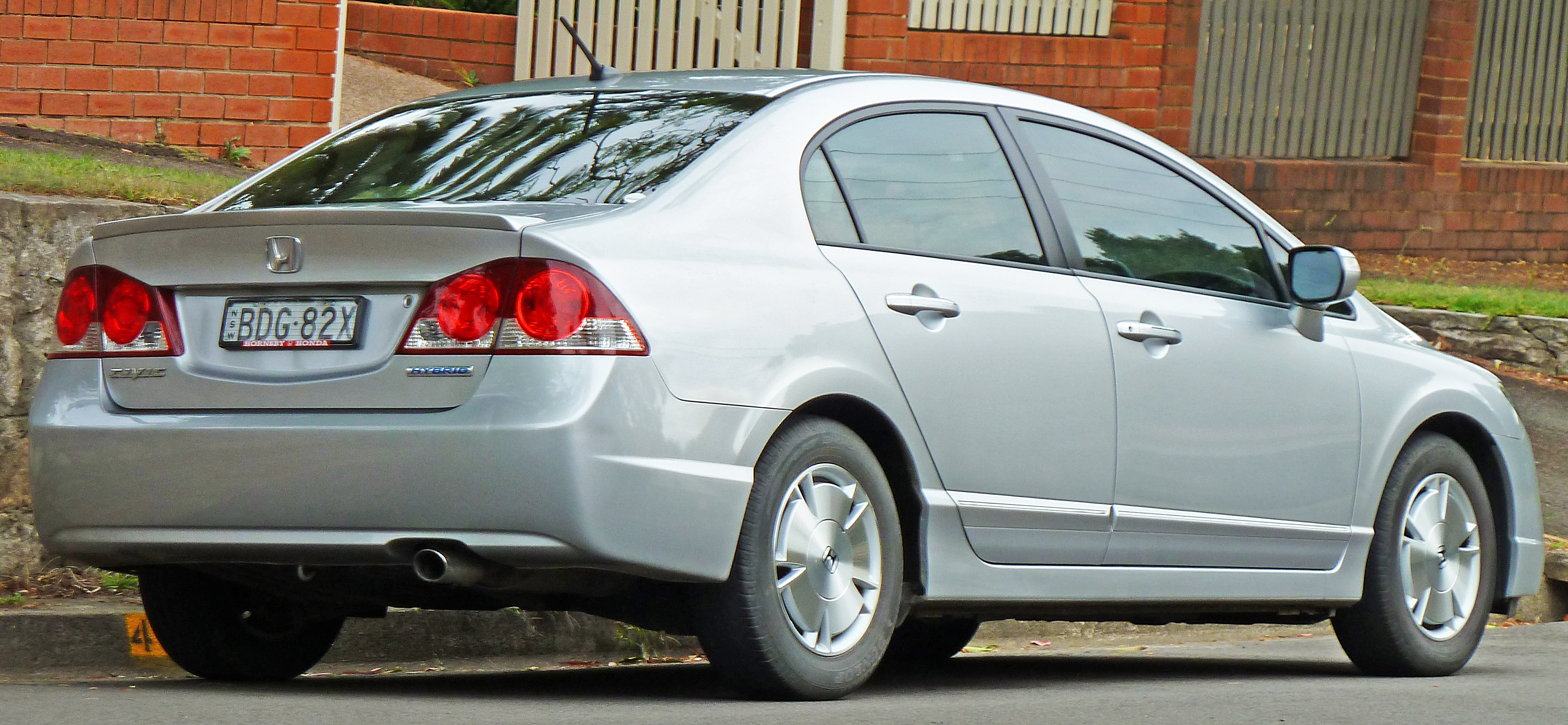
Honda Civic Hybrid (FD3, Australia)

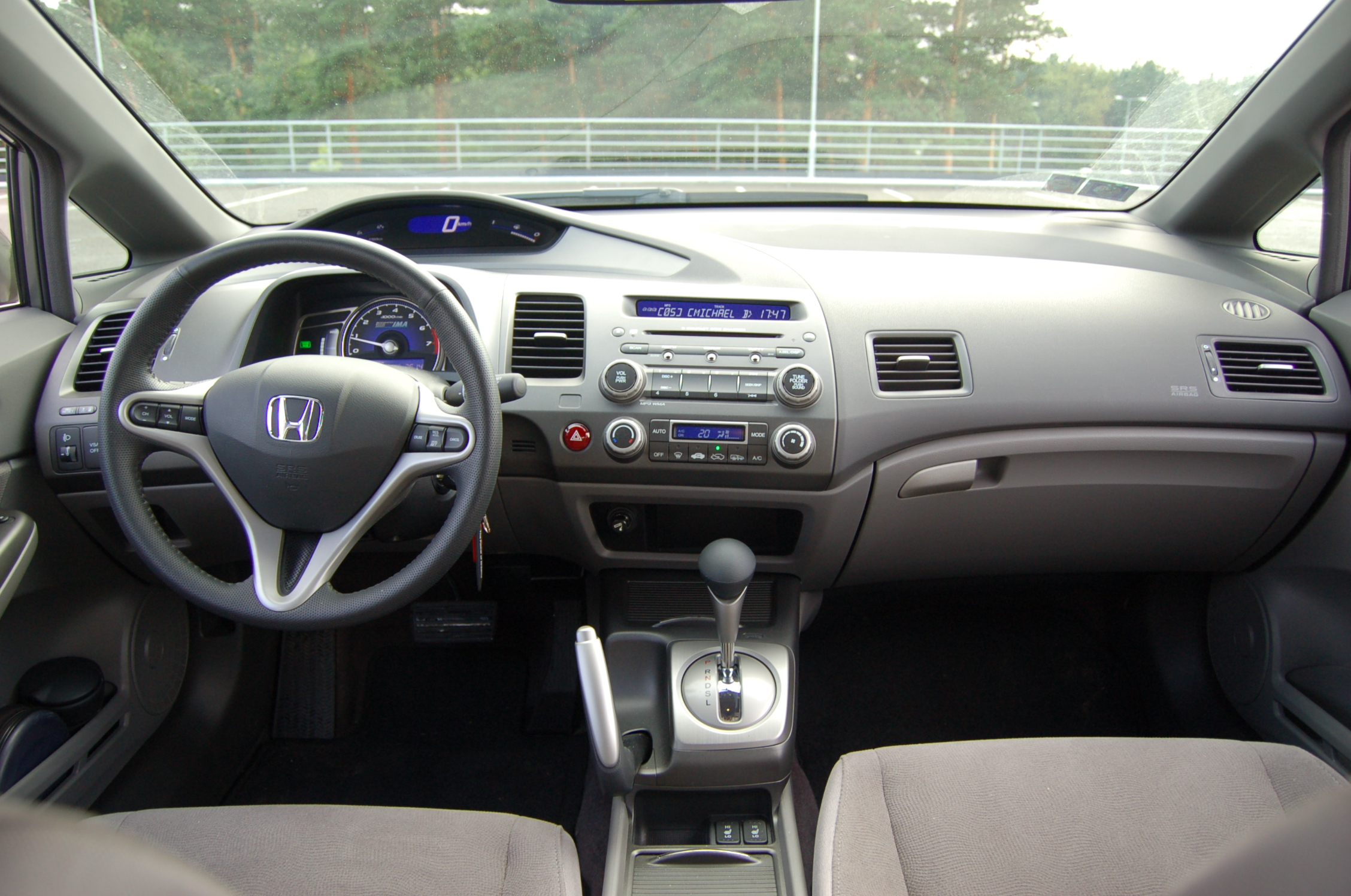
Interior (Europe)

A hybrid version of the eighth-generation Civic sedan was also offered, which became the second-generation Civic Hybrid. As with other Civics, there are some styling differences to the exterior between the North American and the Japanese market models.

==== Design ====
The powertrain of the second generation Civic Hybrid is similar to that of the first generation, with the following notable changes:

- Updated to fourth generation Integrated Motor Assist (IMA)
- More powerful electric motor of 20 hp (15 kW)
- 158.4 V (132 x 1.2 V) Nickel-metal hydride batteries with 5.5 Ah capacity and a 12% reduction in volume.
- Updated to three stage i-VTEC and VCM (Variable Cylinder Management), which permits deactivation of all four cylinders when cruising at moderate speed to run on electric power only. Engine output is increased to 93 hp (69 kW) at 6,000 rpm and maximum torque to 89 lb⋅ft (121 N⋅m) at 4,500 rpm.
- Combined output of both engine and motor is 110 hp (82 kW) at 6,000 rpm. Maximum torque is rated 123 lb⋅ft (167 N⋅m) at 2,500 rpm.
- A new hybrid compressor for the air-conditioner.
- The continuously variable transmission provides a 9% wider ratio range of 2.52 - 0.421:1 between the maximum and minimum gear ratios for better acceleration and reduced engine rpm at high speeds.
- Discontinued manual transmission option.
- The U.S. EPA fuel economy estimate is increased to city 49 mpg_{‑US} (4.8 L/100 km; 59 mpg_{‑imp}), highway 51 mpg_{‑US} (4.6 L/100 km; 61 mpg_{‑imp}). (In 2008: EPA revised the way it estimates fuel mileage, as a result, the EPA rating for the 2008 model is: city 40 mpg_{‑US} (5.9 L/100 km; 48 mpg_{‑imp}), highway 45 mpg_{‑US} (5.2 L/100 km; 54 mpg_{‑imp})).
- Updated to 15-inch lightweight aerodynamic alloy wheels (later featured on the Civic DX-G in Canada as well).
- Certified as AT-PZEV throughout 50 states.

By using high-performance magnets and high-density windings, Honda is able to increase the power output of the electric motor by 50% to 20 hp (15 kW) at 2,000 rpm when compared with the first generation. The inverter that controls motor speed is integrated with the motor's ECU for more precise control, resulting in greater efficiency and fuel economy. The output of the battery is increased by around 30% to 158.4 V. The battery storage box is designed for better cooling performance and vibration resistance to enhance long-term reliability. The higher output of the electric motor enables the car to run on electricity only, at a steady 15 to 20 mph (24–32 km/h) when cruising on a flat surface.

An internal electric motor is added to the air-conditioner, so it can be powered by either the engine, an electric motor, or both. At a stop, the compressor powered by the battery keeps the cabin cool. An additional compressor that is powered by the petrol engine also engages if rapid cooling is required. When the interior temperature is stable, air conditioning is provided by the battery solely. As soon as the brake pedal is lifted, the petrol engine comes back to life again.

The new three-stage i-VTEC valvetrain has low-rpm, high-rpm, and cylinder idle mode. High output valve timing helps the engine to increase its output by 9%. During deceleration, the engine is kept idle. There is no combustion in all four cylinders and the cylinders are sealed shut, reducing pumping losses by the engine. As a result, the recovery of energy wasted during braking is improved by 10%.

A digital display is incorporated in the instrument dash showing how much electricity is sent to the battery or how much is used. When the car is braked moderately, all the green bars light up showing energy recaptured. When the car is braked harder, the conventional brakes are activated.

Car and Driver found when compared with the previous generation, the car was faster, offered greater refinement, was quieter at highway speed, with a stiffer body and a revised suspension that handled bumps better and more quietly.

==== Fuel economy ====
It is estimated that, when compared to a gasoline engine only Civic sedan of 2006 with an automatic transmission, the Civic Hybrid provides an increase of fuel economy in city driving of about 63% and an increase of fuel economy in highway driving of about 27%. The CVT transmission is designed to achieve the highest efficiency for a given rpm.

A class-action lawsuit filed in 2012 alleged that Honda falsely advertised the fuel economy of the Civic Hybrid and that owners were getting significantly lower mileage. The Los Angeles Times reported in May 2012 that at least 36 small-claims lawsuits had also been filed against Honda over the alleged false advertisement of gas mileage.

Some users reported that the fuel economy of the Civic Hybrid was reduced after Honda installed a software update to prolong the life of the hybrid battery by reducing the electric motor's output and putting more reliance on the gasoline engine.

==== Battery life ====
In February 2014, Consumer Reports found a high rate of battery failure in 2009–2010 models, with over 30% of responders reporting they had needed a battery replacement within the last 12 months, and said most were probably replaced under warranty. Honda acknowledged problems with the 2006–2008 models which could cause the batteries to "deteriorate and eventually fail"; software updates were issued to prolong the life of the battery, but some owners reported these updates led to reduced fuel economy and power. The 132 NiMH cell pack suffers from imbalance as individual cells cannot be monitored or charged. Monitoring is available at a 12 cell sub-pack level, but charging is not. After years/miles of use, the cells become imbalanced as the cells charge/discharge at slightly different rates from one another. Eventually, strong cells are limiting the upper capacity of the pack and weak cells are limiting the lower capacity of the pack thereby reducing the usable capacity of the pack.

In 2015, Honda extended IMA battery warranty of all 2009–2011 Civic Hybrid to 10-year / 150,000 mile.

==== Market reception ====
The Civic Hybrid ranks as the second best selling electric hybrid car in the U.S.

==== Cost of ownership ====
Consumer Reports ran an article in April 2006 stating that hybrid vehicles would not pay for themselves over 5 years of ownership. However, there was an error in the calculation of depreciation for the hybrid vehicles. It resulted in overstating how much extra money the hybrids would cost their owners during the first five years of ownership. When corrected, the Honda Civic Hybrid did have a payback period of slightly less than 5 years. In October 2010 Vincentric performed a hybrid cost of ownership analysis for the USA market. In this analysis, it compared hybrids' 5-year cost of ownership to their all-gas counterparts. The analysis showed that the 2010 Honda Civic Hybrid cost an additional $1830 (~$2,702 in 2025) over a 2010 Honda Civic EX 2D Coupe with an Automatic Transmission (the report assumes 15,000 miles are driven annually and fuel prices are based on a weighted average over the five months prior to October 2010).

In August 2010, Autoblog reported that a replacement battery for the Civic Hybrid retailed at $2,100 (~$3,100 in 2025).

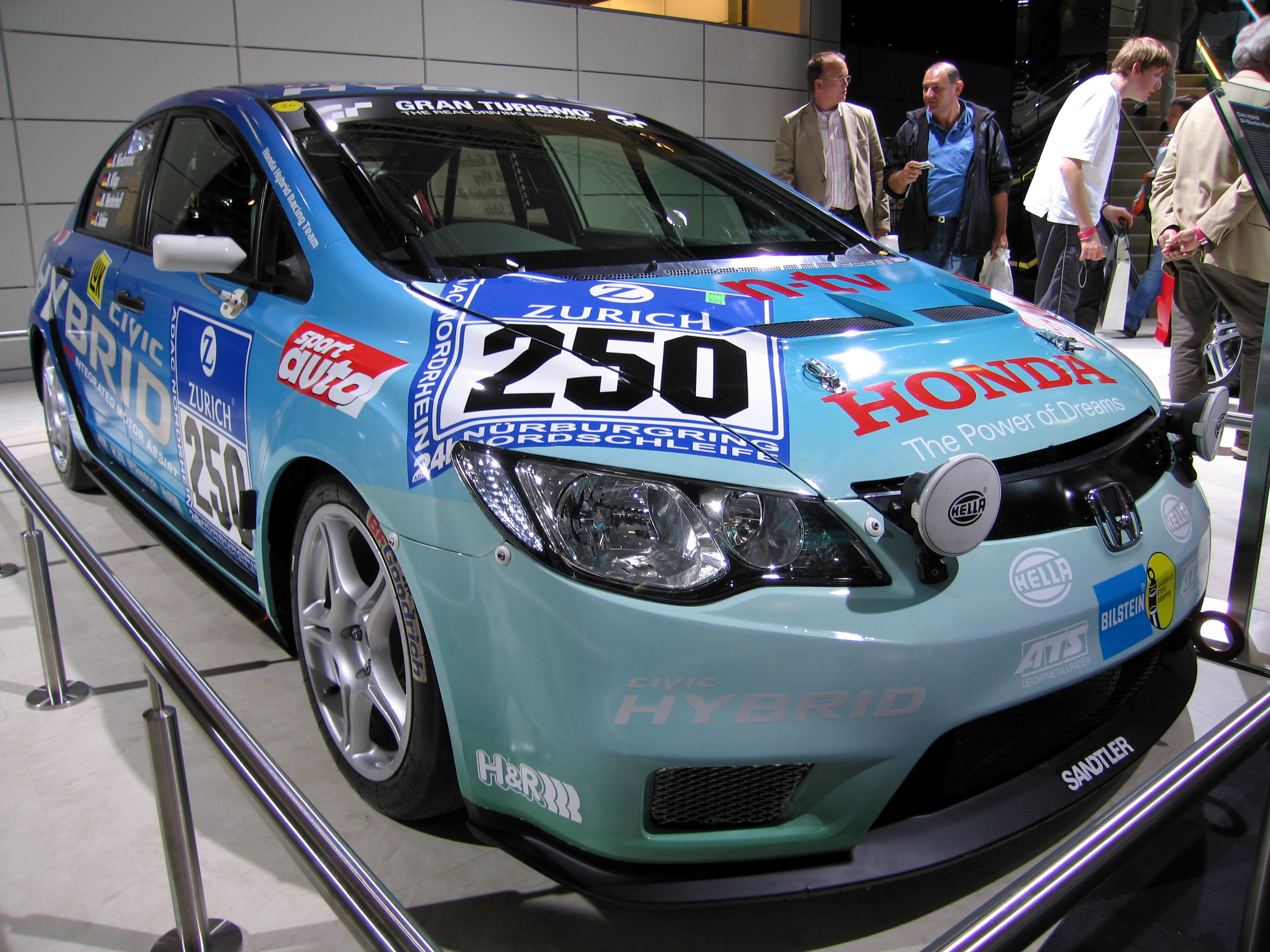
Honda Civic Hybrid race car

==== Other markets ====
The Civic Hybrid was introduced to Southeast Asian markets such as Malaysia in August 2007. It was launched in China in November 2007, Singapore in end-2007 and in India in June 2008.

==== Motorsport ====
The Honda Civic Hybrid competed in 24 Hours Nürburgring in 2007, finishing 108th out of 220 teams starting. The twenty-four-hour race is held around the Nürburgring, one of the world's most grueling courses. A Group N spec Honda Civic Hybrid raced in the Jim Clark Rally and took second in class.

==== Awards and recognition ====
- 2006 North American Car of the Year, along with the rest of the Civic range
- 2006 Motor Trend Car of the Year award, along with the rest of the Civic range.
- 2006 Automotive Journalists Association of Canada (AJAC) Award for Alternative Power Vehicle.
- 2006 Winner of the World Green Car

=== Safety ===
ANCAP test results Honda Civic hybrid 4 door sedan (2007)
Test	Score
Overall	4 /5 stars
Frontal offset	11.24/16
Side impact	15.47/16
Pole	2/2
Seat belt reminders	1/3
Whiplash protection	Not Assessed
Pedestrian protection	Adequate
Electronic stability control	Not Available

ANCAP test results Honda Civic 4 door sedan (2007)
Test	Score
Overall	4 /5 stars
Frontal offset	13.54/16
Side impact	14.36/16
Pole	Not Assessed
Seat belt reminders	1/3
Whiplash protection	Not Assessed
Pedestrian protection	Adequate
Electronic stability control	Optional

== Hatchback (FK1–3, FN1–4; 2005) ==
Civic hatchback
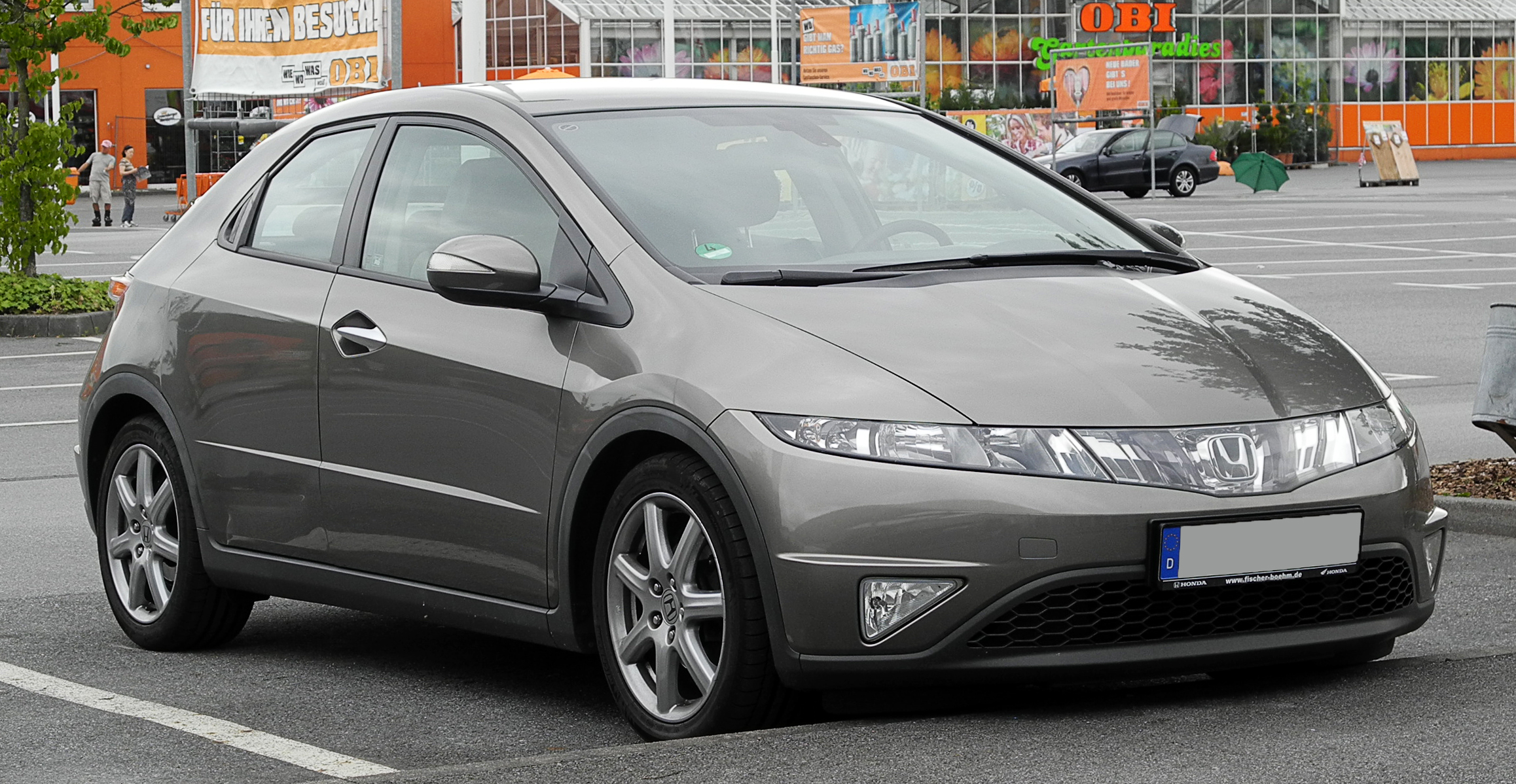
- Civic 5-door hatchback (Europe; pre-facelift)

Overview
- Model code: FN1; FN2; FN3; FN4 (3-door); FK1; FK2; FK3 (5-door)
- Production: 2005–2011
- Assembly: United Kingdom: Swindon (HUM)
- Designer: Toshiyuki Okumoto

Body and chassis
- Body style: 3-door hatchback 5-door hatchback

Powertrain
- Engine: Petrol: 1.4 L L13A7 I4; 1.8 L R18A2 I4; 2.0 L K20Z4 I4 (Type R); Diesel: 2.2 L N22A2 I4 turbo
- Transmission: 6-speed manual 6-speed I-SHIFT automated manual 5-speed automatic

Dimensions
- Wheelbase: 2,635 mm (104 in)
- Length: 4,245–4,276 mm (167–168 in)
- Width: 1,760–1,765 mm (69–69 in)
- Height: 1,460 mm (57 in)
- Curb weight: 1,140–1,332 kg (2,513–2,937 lb)

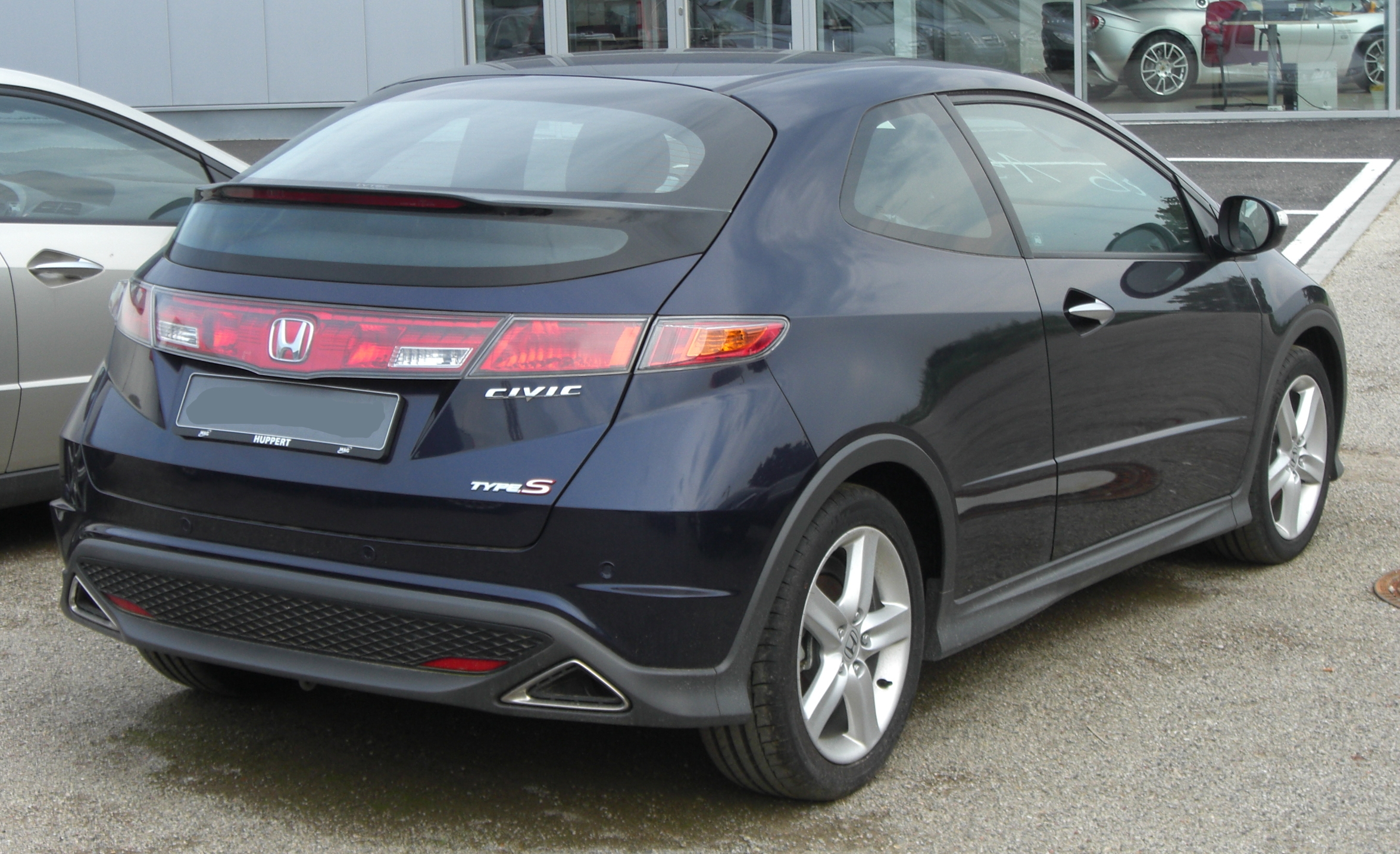
Civic Type S 3-door hatchback (Europe; pre-facelift)

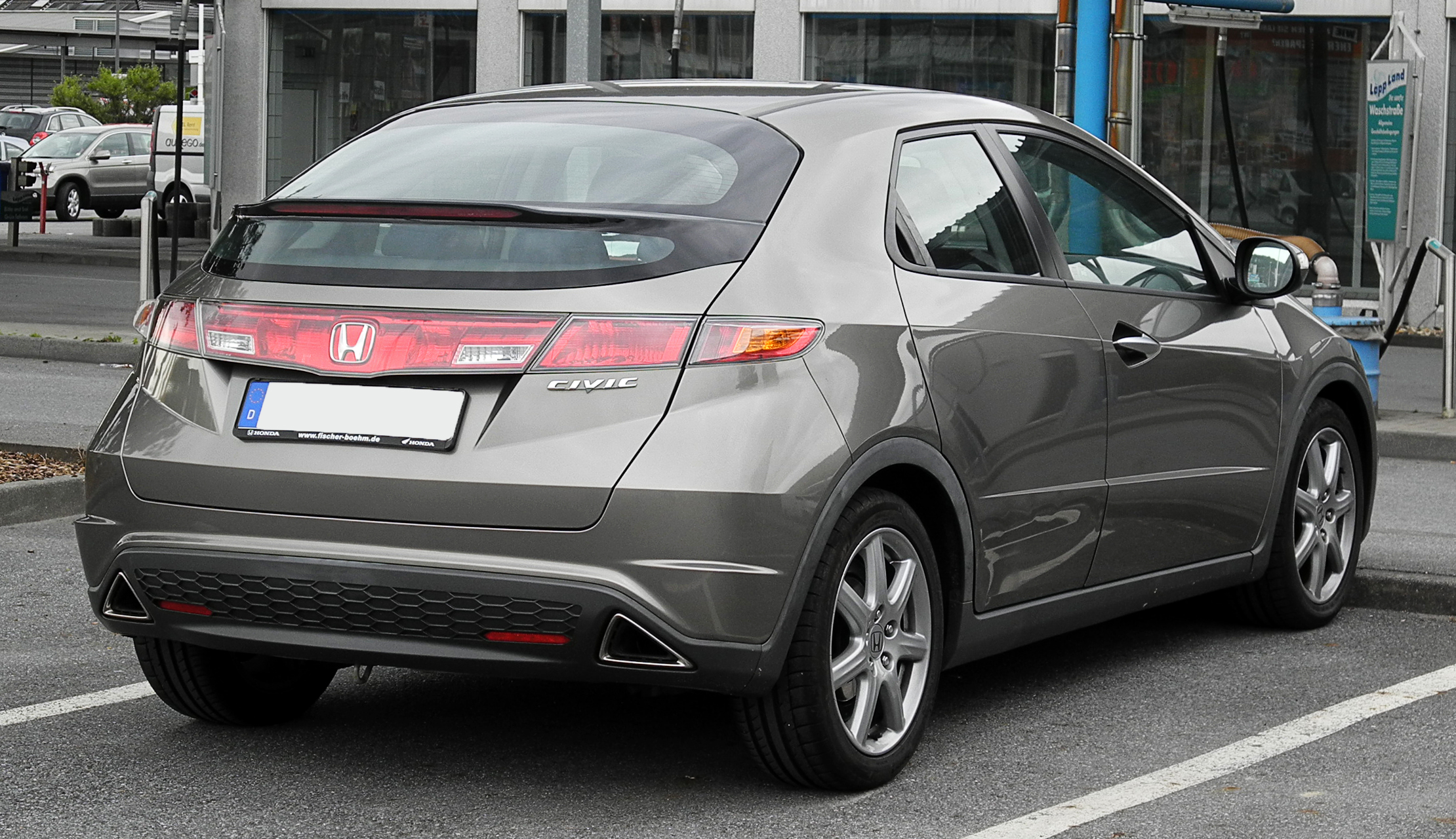
Civic 5-door hatchback (Europe; pre-facelift)

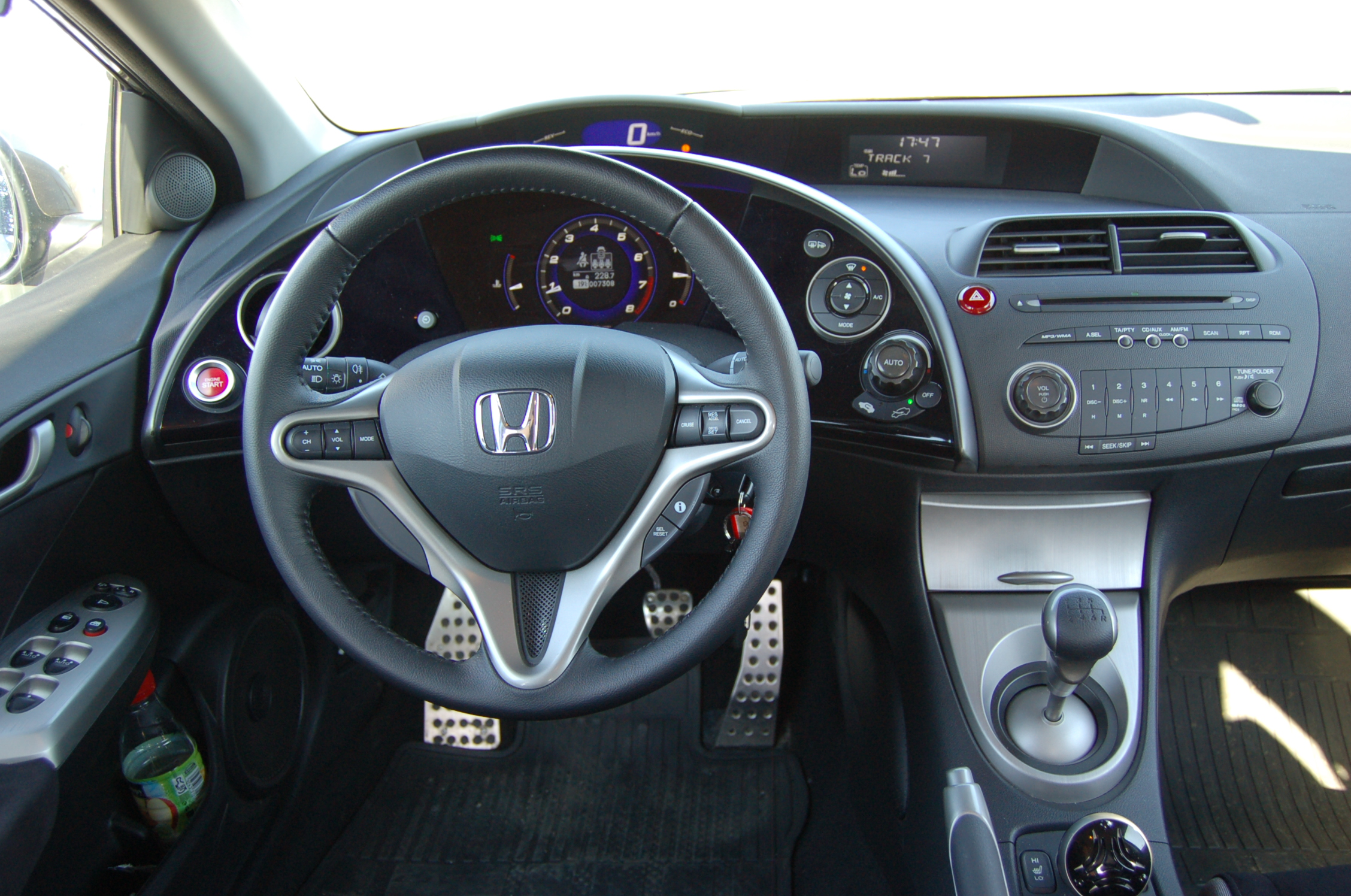
Interior

The European-market Civic (FK/FN) was offered as three and five-door hatchbacks and produced in Swindon, United Kingdom. It has a different appearance and suspension setup compared to the Civic sedans and coupés.

Designed by Toshiyuki Okumoto, the exterior of the European model more aggressively styled; the sweeping front arc is maintained and a perspex cover resembling a lamp cluster replaces the grille. The rear tail lights are also similarly styled. Triangular accents are found front and back, with triangular fog-lamps in front and dual triangle exhaust tips at the back. The rear glass is split into two levels, divided by a spoiler lip and the fuel filler cap is a race-inspired exposed metal effect cap. For the 5-door models, the rear door is hidden away with the door handles tucked away at the corners of the rear windows, creating the illusion of a two-door coupé.

Mechanically, the European-market Civic differs from the sedan and coupé variants in that it uses a simpler torsion beam suspension system for the rear wheels compared to the double-wishbone system in the sedan and coupé versions. The more compact suspension of the European-market Civic allows it to keep its large interior space, while reducing its length compared to its predecessor.

Inside, the European-market Civic follows the same split-level or "two-tier" instrument panel as the American and JDM Civics. However, it has circular A/C vents and switchgear. There is also a start button reminiscent of the Honda S2000. The handbrake is in a more conventional position behind the gear stick. All around there is a generous use of metallic trim.

The vehicle features a rear seat folding system called the "magic seats", where rear seat cushions can be raised in part or full width allowing a secure and tall load area. Alternatively, the seat back can be tumbled flat as per a conventional hatch. When it's in its normal position, a storage room is available under the rear seat. It is made possible by situating the fuel tank beneath the front seats, freeing rear floor space under the rear seat like the Fit/Jazz. There is also a "hidden" storage compartment in the boot under the floor. The lid, which normally forms part of the boot floor, can be sunk down to a lower level to increase the load area, designed to allow the boot area to accommodate larger or taller items. In the normal position, the storage area can be used to hide valuables away under the floor.

Standard equipment across all trim levels include single zone climate control and heated mirrors/rear windscreen. Optional features throughout the range consist of electric folding mirrors, a panoramic glass roof, dual climate control, automatic headlights, automatic dimming rearview mirror, automatic windshield wipers, xenon lights, headlight washers, heated leather seats, alloy wheels, fog lights, and satellite navigation through the centre screen.

In March 2008, Honda announced that it was recalling 79,000 eighth-generation Civics due to a potential problem with faulty handbrakes.

The car won 2007 Irish Car of the Year.

=== Markets ===
In Australia, Serbia, Macedonia, Israel, Russia, Poland, Croatia, Ireland and South Africa both the 4-door JDM/Asian and 5-door European-market Civic models are available. In certain European countries, the four-door JDM Civic was available with the hybrid powertrain, and this was the only Civic sedan available in the UK. In other markets where sedans are more popular (such as Ireland, and Finland), a range of sedans similar to the JDM models are available with the 1.8 L i-VTEC. In Turkey, a 125 PS 1.6 L i-VTEC engine was available with the 4-door JDM/Asian body since tax brackets of this country rely on engine displacement (higher taxes are applied to the vehicles that have engine displacement more than 1600 cc). No saloon version was offered in most West European markets.

The European-market Civic was also sold in Australasia as the Civic Hatch, alongside the sedan body style. In Singapore and Brunei, the 3-door European Civic Type R was available.

=== Powertrain ===
Engines include a 1.4-litre i-DSI, 1.4-litre i-VTEC (L13Z1), the 1.8-litre i-VTEC (R18A2) shared with the American and JDM models (although the American and JDM cars have this engine available as R18A1), and a 2.2-litre i-CTDi N22A2 turbo-diesel. A 6-speed manual transmission was available across the range. An automated manual transmission, known as i-SHIFT was available for models with 1.4- and 1.8-litre petrol engines. A 6-speed torque converter automatic transmission was also available. A 2.0-litre i-VTEC (K20Z4) petrol Type-R high-performance version was also available. Si and the Type-S models were also offered in Europe, with the Type-S in the three-door configuration (as is the more powerful Type-R) and the Si as a five-door, but both going without the 198bhp 2.0L engine used in the North American Si.

=== 2009 facelift ===
Euro Civics (hatchback) received a mild facelift for 2009. The main visual change is the new redesigned front grille which now features two open intakes. The Type S received a grille similar to the Type R, only without the red badge. The rear bumper was also replaced by a smooth single piece design from a honeycomb effect plastic trim, minor changes to the interior were also made such as the addition of a 12v socket, iPod connector and 3.5mm aux input within the armrest storage bay, the plastic trim around the dash changed from a gloss black trim to a matte textured design. The entry-level 1.4 i-DSI engine has been dropped from the line-up and replaced with a new, more powerful 100 PS 1.4 i-VTEC engine which was available with a new version of the i-SHIFT transmission.

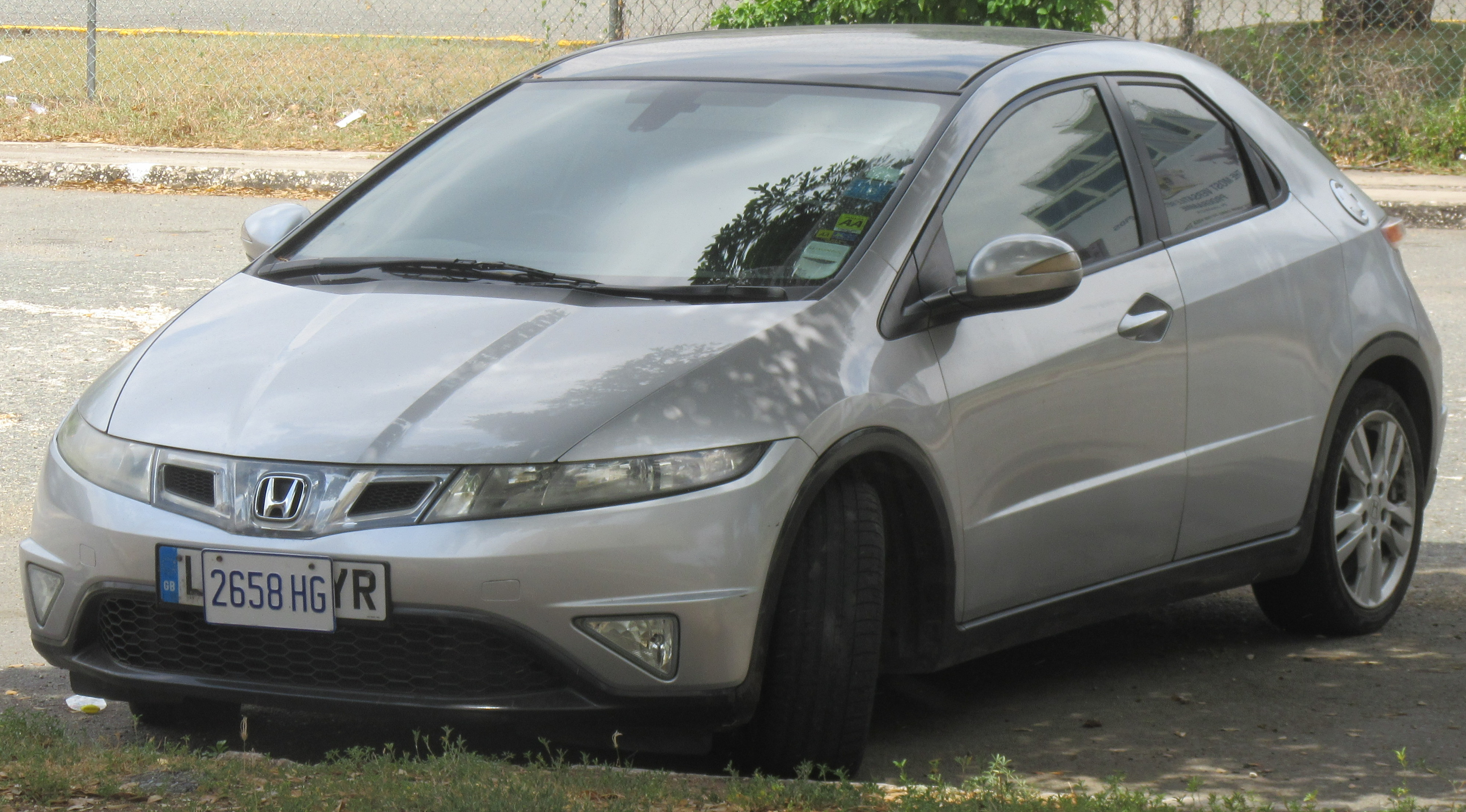
2009 facelift

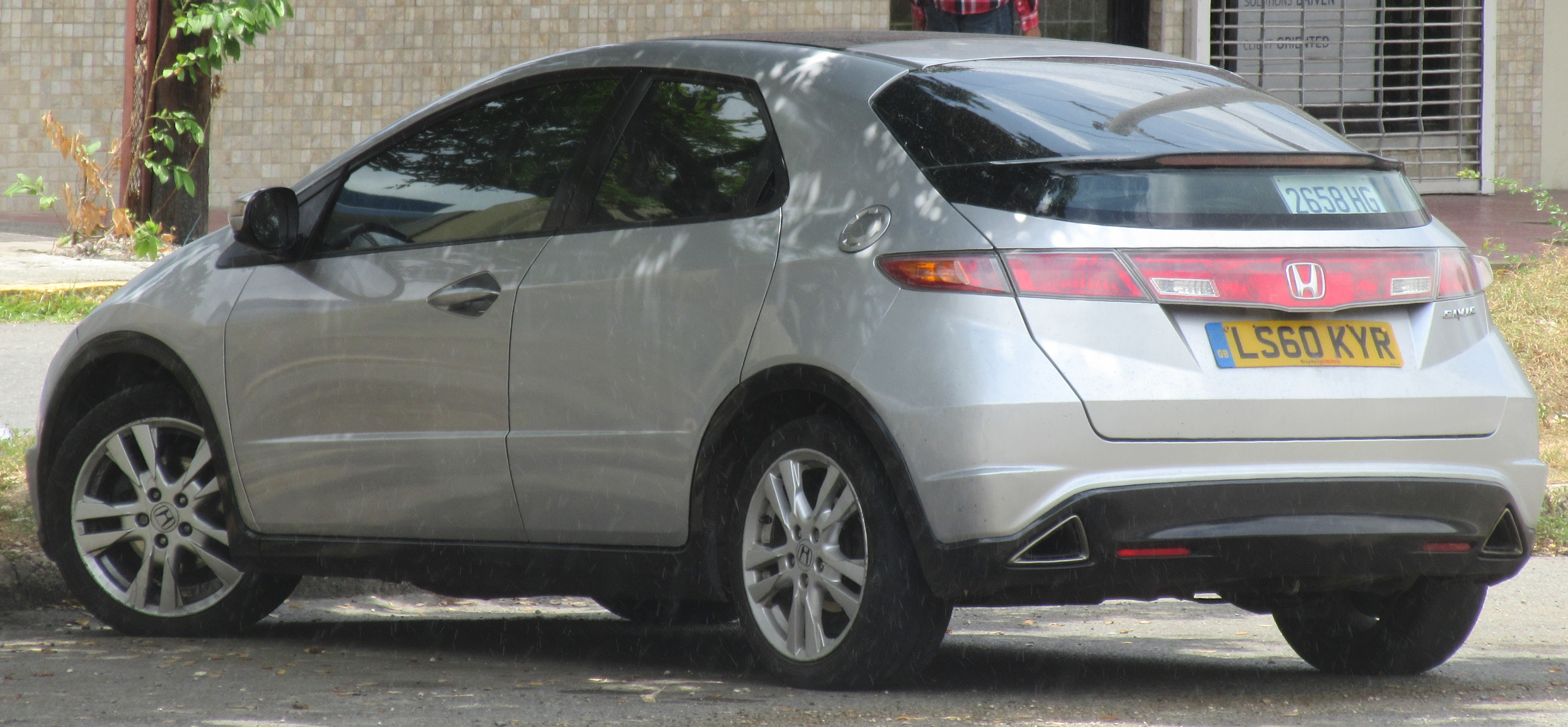
2009 facelift

=== 2011 facelift ===
The car received a mild facelift for 2011, including a new front grille which was said to be inspired by that of European Type R model, new alloy wheels which are now standard equipment, body colour side-skirts for Type S model, a new ionized Bronze colour for the exterior. For the interior, the SE and ES models gets half fabric and Alcantara, Si model comes with half leather and Alcantara. Production for the 2011 hatchback started at the Swindon plant in November 2010. Honda discontinued the 2.2 L i-CTDi diesel engine offered in Civic from 2011.

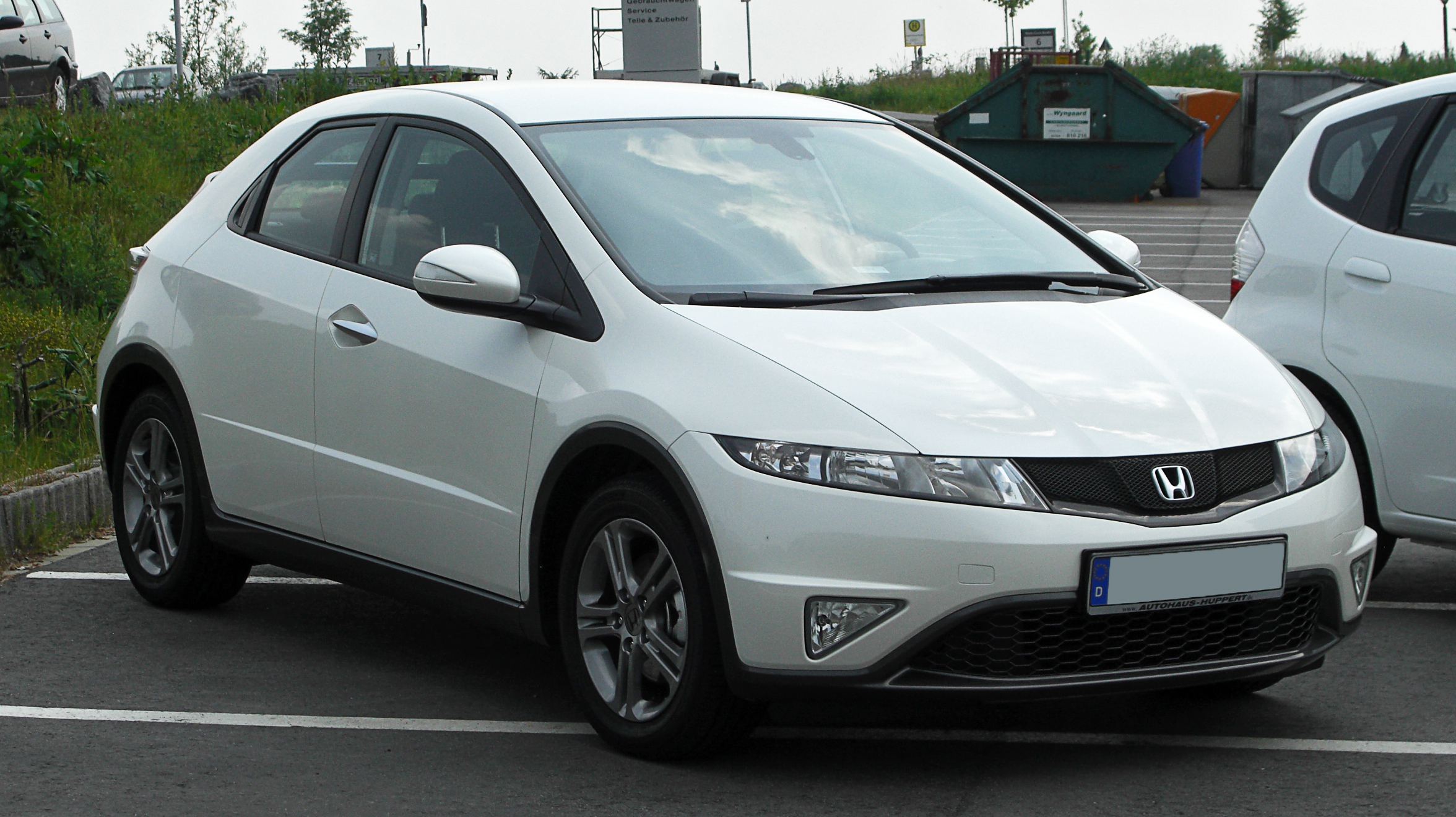
2011 facelift

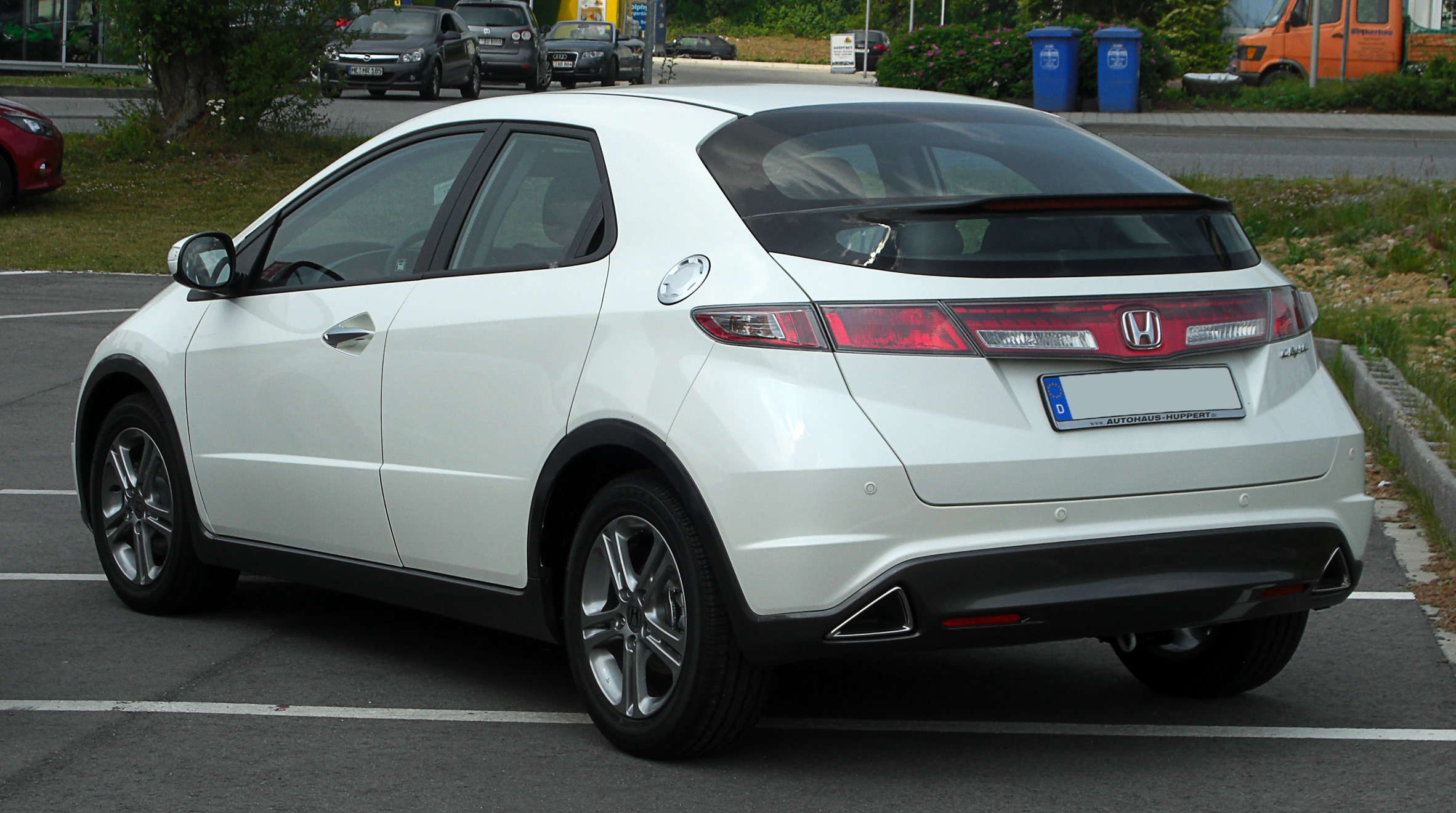
2011 facelift

=== Motorsport ===
Matt Neal won the 2011 British Touring Car Championship driving a Civic BTCC.

== Type R ==
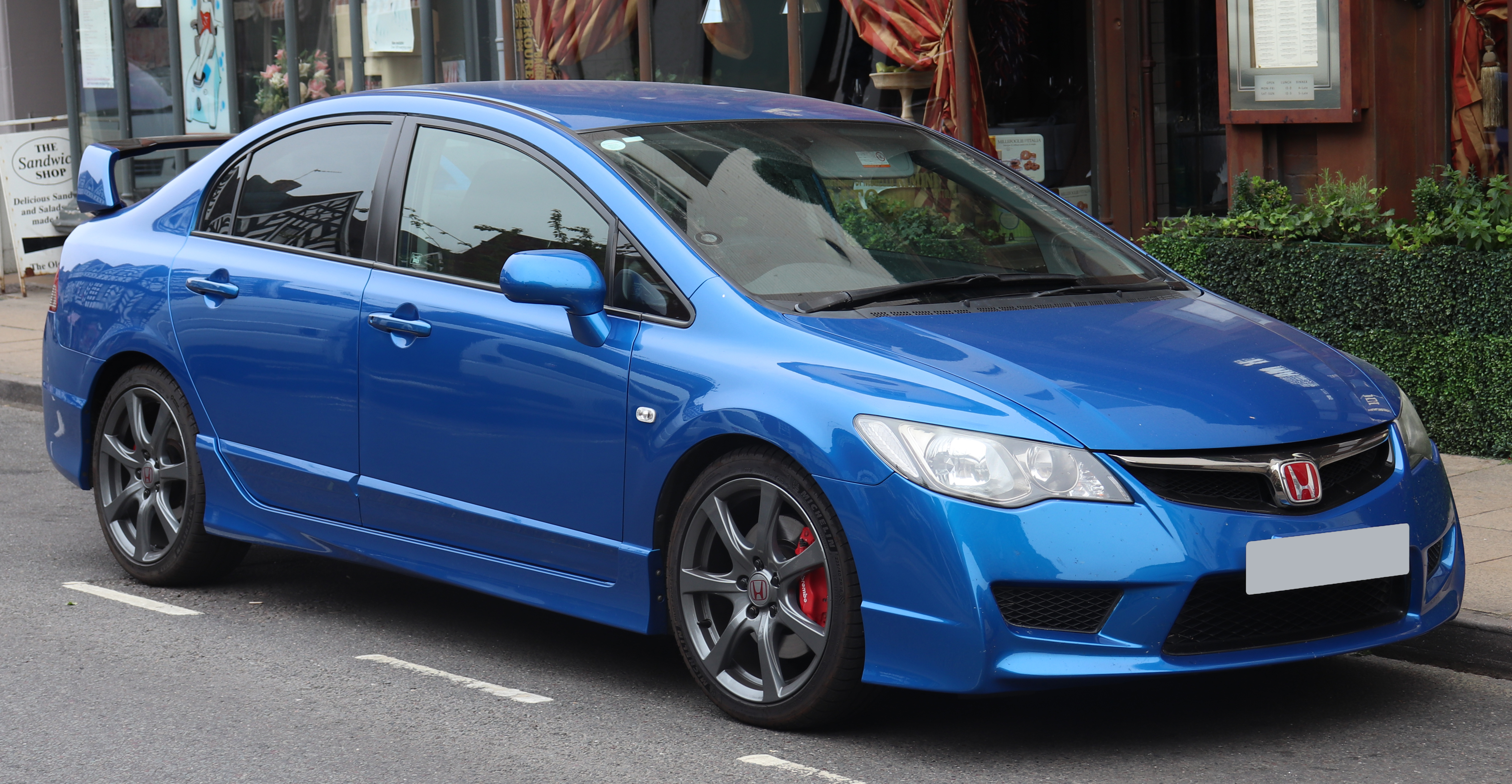
Civic Type R 4-door sedan (Japan)

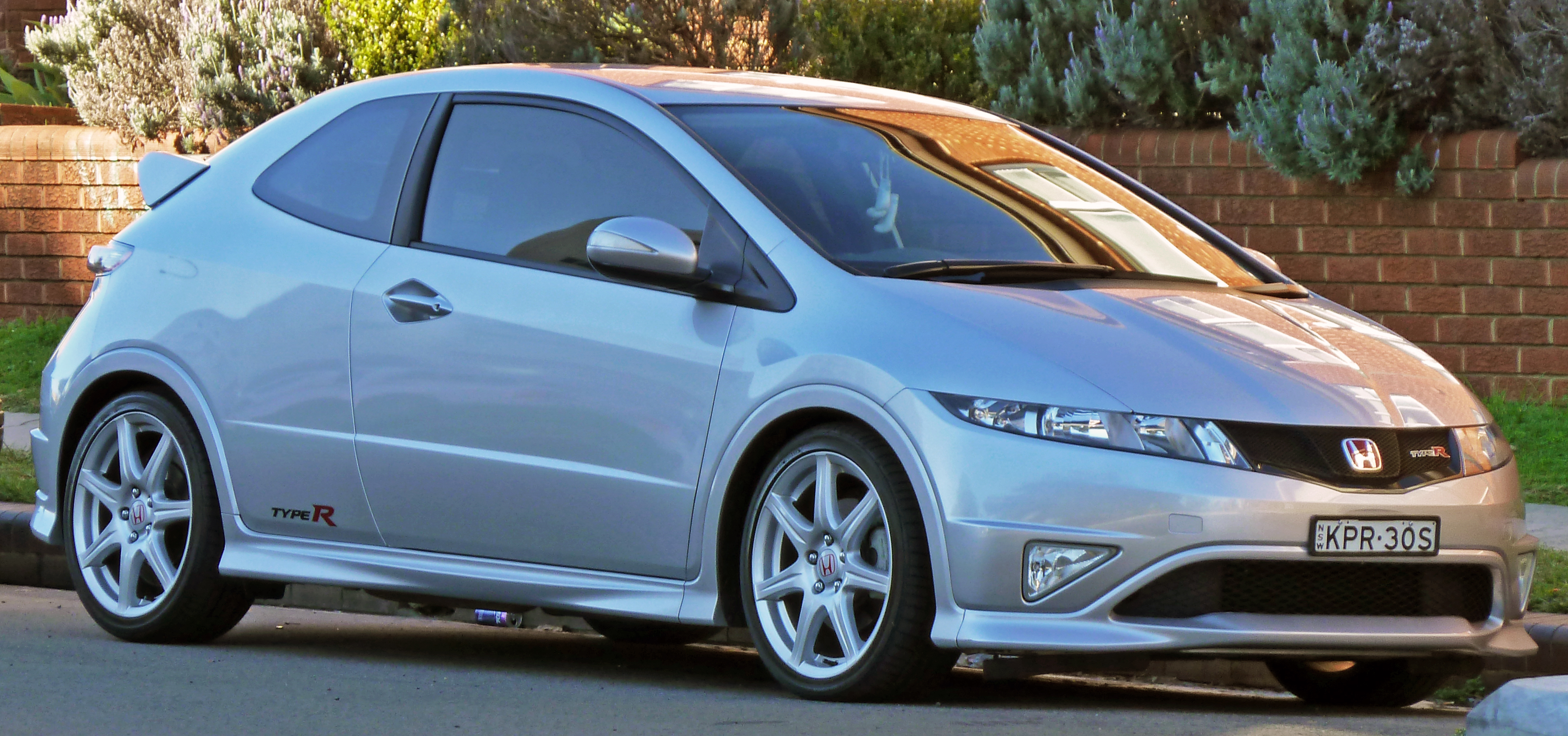
Civic Type R 3-door hatchback (Australia)

Honda debuted a Type R concept for the European Civic at the 2006 Geneva Motor Show; the Type R, basing on the three-door hatchback developed for the European market, has a 2.0-litre, 201 PS (148 kW; 198 hp) at 7800 rpm inline-four engine. The suspension uses MacPherson struts up front and a torsion beam in the back, while the car itself was initially thought to be lighter than the standard Civic as dictated by Honda Type R philosophy. Sophisticated handling aids such as traction control were initially thought to be completely eschewed for a purer, more soulful driving character. In the end, Honda did include a modified version of their VSA (Vehicle Stability Assist) that was specifically tuned to the car so as to better adhere to said philosophy. The Type R went on sale in the UK in February or March 2007, and is scheduled to reach Australia in July the same year.

The JDM/Asian 4-door Civic Type R went on sale on March 29, 2007. The Type R powered by an uprated K20A 2.0-litre i-VTEC engine producing 225 PS (165 kW) at 8000 rpm (Available in Japan and Malaysia only), while the other markets have 201 PS (148 kW; 198 hp) at 7800 rpm and comes with a specially tuned sports suspension that includes new Brembo brakes. The prototype Type R was used as the official car of the Formula 1 2006 Japanese Grand Prix. This will mark the first time that Honda will produce two separate distinct Civic Type R models.

Mugen's Civic RR, the Type R sedan's uprated model, is available in Japan. The Mugen RR sheds an additional 10 kg (22 lb) off the standard Civic Type R's weight, coming in at 1,255 kg (2,767 lb). The Mugen RR's engine is rated at 240 PS (177 kW) at 8,000 rpm, an additional 15 PS (11 kW) over the normal JDM Type R, and produces 212 N⋅m (156 lb⋅ft) of torque at 7,000 rpm.

Complementing the added power and decreased weight are a new bodykit, upgraded brakes all around, a retuned suspension, new wheels and tires, and logo-emblazoned Recaro sport buckets. Only 300 cars, all painted Milano Red, were made available.

Preceded by Honda Civic (seventh generation)	Honda Civic (eighth generation); 2005–2012	Succeeded by Honda Civic (ninth generation)
