= Yi-Ming Wei =

- 魏一鸣
- Born: 1968
- Citizenship: Chinese
- Occupation: Academic
- Title: Distinguished Professor, Beijing Institute of Technology; Member of acatech – German Academy of Science and Engineering
- Awards: Guanghua Engineering Science and Technology Award (2024); Fellow of the Operations Research Society of China (2022); National Innovation and Excellence Award Certificate (2020); National Outstanding Science and Technology Researcher (2012); National Science Fund for Distinguished Young Scholars (2004)

Academic background
- Education: Kunming Institute of Technology (BEng, 1989); Kunming University of Science and Technology (MEng, 1991); University of Science and Technology Beijing (PhD, 1996)

Academic work
- Discipline: Energy and environmental systems engineering
- Sub-discipline: Energy and environmental complex systems analysis Carbon emission reduction systems engineering Integrated assessment modelling of climate change Global climate governance
- Institutions: Beijing Institute of Technology (2009–present); Chinese Academy of Sciences (1996–2008); Kunming University of Science and Technology (1991–1993)
- Website: som.bit.edu.cn/gbszdw/gbjxzy/gbsglgcx/b124773.htm

Yi-Ming Wei (born in March 1968) is a Chinese academic specialising in energy and environmental systems engineering. He is a distinguished professor and vice president of Beijing Institute of Technology (BIT), where he directs the Beijing Laboratory for System Engineering of Carbon Neutrality. His research focuses on energy and environmental complex systems analysis, carbon emission reduction systems engineering, integrated assessment modelling of climate change and global climate governance. He was elected as a member of the German Academy of Science and Engineering (acatech) in 2023. He was a coordinating lead author of the chapter on energy systems in Working Group III's contribution to the Intergovernmental Panel on Climate Change (IPCC) Sixth Assessment Report.

== Education ==
Wei studied resources engineering at Kunming Institute of Technology (now Kunming University of Science and Technology) from 1985 to 1989. He received a bachelor's degree in engineering in 1989 and a master's degree in resources engineering in 1991. He completed a PhD in resources engineering at the University of Science and Technology Beijing in 1996.

== Academic career ==
Wei was a lecturer in resources engineering at Kunming University of Science and Technology from 1991 to 1993. Between 1996 and 1998, he conducted postdoctoral research and worked as an associate research fellow at the State Key Laboratory of Resources and Environmental Information Systems of the Chinese Academy of Sciences (CAS). From 1998 to 2008, he worked at the CAS's Institute of Policy and Management, serving as deputy director from 2000 to 2008.

Wei joined Beijing Institute of Technology in January 2009. The same year, Wei became the founding director of the Center for Energy and Environmental Policy Research (CEEP) at Beijing Institute of Technology. According to the September 2026 IDEAS/RePEc rankings, CEEP was ranked 12th among institutions in energy economics and 14th in environmental economics. Wei himself was ranked 17th and 12th, respectively, among authors in the same fields.

He served as the dean of the School of Management from 2009 to 2019 and became a vice president of the university in 2019. He was appointed a chair professor in 2016 and a distinguished professor in 2021. He was appointed an honorary professor at University College London in 2018.

Wei was a visiting professor at the Japan Advanced Institute of Science and Technology in 2000 and a senior visiting scholar at Harvard University in 2005.

== Research ==
Wei's research focuses on complex energy and environmental systems, climate change mitigation, integrated assessment modelling and global climate governance.

His research has included the development and application of China's Climate Change Integrated Assessment Model (C3IAM), which is used to evaluate energy transitions, emissions pathways and climate policies. In 2018, Wei and colleagues published a study in Natural Hazards applying C3IAM to assess national climate commitments under the Shared Socioeconomic Pathways.

His co-authored studies also include a 2020 paper with Nicholas Stern and other researchers in Nature Sustainability, examining the relationship between economic development and household carbon-footprint inequality in China. In 2023, Wei collaborated with Felix Creutzig, Ottmar Edenhofer and colleagues on a study published in Nature Climate Change, assessing the carbon emissions and economic implications of a European Union embargo on Russian fossil fuels using the C3IAM/GEEPA model.

His more recent research has examined resource constraints on energy transitions and the wider consequences of climate policies. In 2025, Wei and colleagues published a study in Nature Climate Change investigating mineral-resource constraints on pathways towards global climate targets. In 2026, he co-authored a study with Drew Shindell and other researchers in Nature Food, examining how changes in ozone concentrations affect the estimated agricultural and economic benefits of carbon-neutrality policies.

As of 29 October 2026, Wei's Google Scholar profile reported 62,688 citations and an h-index of 120.

== Academic leadership and service ==
Wei served alongside Leon Clarke as a coordinating lead author of Chapter 6, "Energy Systems", in the IPCC Working Group III report Climate Change 2022: Mitigation of Climate Change. He was elected a fellow of the Operations Research Society of China in 2022 and has served as a vice president of the society since 2024. In March 2026, he was elected president of the China Society for Social and Economic Systems Analysis.

He has served as founding editor-in-chief of Energy and Climate Change and the Chinese-language journal 能源与气候变化. His other editorial appointments have included associate editorships at Applied Energy and Energy Strategy Reviews, and membership of the advisory board of Energy Policy.

== Honours and awards ==
In 2004, Wei received support from the National Natural Science Foundation of China for Distinguished Young Scholars. In 2012, Wei was awarded as National Outstanding Science and Technology Researcher by CAST. He received a National Innovation and Excellence Award certificate in 2020. He was elected a fellow of the Operations Research Society of China in 2022. Wei was elected a member of acatech – German Academy of Science and Engineering in 2023. Wei received the Guanghua Engineering Science and Technology Award in 2024. His other awards include a 2022 first prize for natural sciences from the Ministry of Education and a first prize in National Teaching Achievement Awards for a project led by him, announced in 2023.

== Selected publications ==
=== Books and edited volumes ===
- Wei, Yi-Ming (2025). Carbon Mitigation System Engineering: Principles, Methods and Practices. Springer. doi:10.1007/978-981-95-0371-1. ISBN 9789819503704.
- Wei, Yi-Ming; Liang, Qiao-Mei; Wu, Gang; Liao, Hua (2019). Energy Economics: Understanding Energy Security in China. Emerald Publishing. doi:10.1108/9781838672935. ISBN 9781838672942.
- Wei, Yi-Ming; Liao, Hua (2018). Energy Economics: Understanding and Interpreting Energy Poverty in China. Emerald Publishing. doi:10.1108/9781787567795. ISBN 9781787567801.
- Wei, Yi-Ming; Liao, Hua (2016). Energy Economics: Energy Efficiency in China. Springer. doi:10.1007/978-3-319-44631-8. ISBN 9783319446295.
- Wei, Yiming; Wu, Gang; Liu, Lancui; Zou, Lele, eds. (2011). Energy Economics: CO2 Emissions in China. Springer. doi:10.1007/978-3-642-13847-8. ISBN 9783642138461.
- Wei, Yi-Ming; Fan, Ying; Han, Zhi-Yong; Wu, Gang, eds. (2009). Energy Economics: Modeling and Empirical Analysis in China. CRC Press. ISBN 9781439811214.

=== Journal articles ===
- Wei, Yi-Ming; Wei, Si-Yi; Yu, Biying; et al. (2026). "Including ozone increases estimated global crop and economic benefits of carbon neutrality policies". Nature Food. 7 (5): 441–451. Bibcode:2026NatFo...7..441W. doi:10.1038/s43016-026-01351-y. PMID 42162357.
- You, Kairui; Li, Yan; Cai, Weiguang; Zhang, Lulu; Liu, Zhengxuan; Feng, Wei; Wei, Yi-Ming (2025). "Mitigating emissions and costs through demand-side solutions in Chinese residential buildings". Nature Communications. 16 (1) 7358. Bibcode:2025NatCo..16.7358Y. doi:10.1038/s41467-025-62675-0. PMC 12335548. PMID 40783492.
- Wei, Yi-Ming; Liu, Lan-Cui; Kang, Jia-Ning; et al. (2025). "Navigating energy transition solutions for climate targets with minerals constraint". Nature Climate Change. 15 (8): 833–841. Bibcode:2025NatCC..15..833W. doi:10.1038/s41558-025-02373-3.
- Han, Te; Wang, Yongzhen; Mi, Zhifu; Han, Kai; Tian, Jinpeng; Wei, Yi-Ming (2025). "Designing and regulating clean energy data centres". Nature Reviews Clean Technology. 1 (6): 373–374. doi:10.1038/s44359-025-00062-0.
- Yu, Biying; Zhao, Zihao; Wei, Yi-Ming; et al. (2023). "Approaching national climate targets in China considering the challenge of regional inequality". Nature Communications. 14 (1) 8342. Bibcode:2023NatCo..14.8342Y. doi:10.1038/s41467-023-44122-0. PMC 10724292. PMID 38102105.
- Liu, Li-Jing; Jiang, Hong-Dian; Liang, Qiao-Mei; et al. (2023). "Carbon emissions and economic impacts of an EU embargo on Russian fossil fuels". Nature Climate Change. 13 (3): 290–296. Bibcode:2023NatCC..13..290L. doi:10.1038/s41558-023-01606-7.
- Wei, Yi-Ming; Kang, Jia-Ning; Liu, Lan-Cui; et al. (2021). "A proposed global layout of carbon capture and storage in line with a 2 °C climate target". Nature Climate Change. 11 (2): 112–118. Bibcode:2021NatCC..11..112W. doi:10.1038/s41558-020-00960-0.
- Wei, Yi-Ming; Han, Rong; Wang, Ce; et al. (2020). "Self-preservation strategy for approaching global warming targets in the post-Paris Agreement era". Nature Communications. 11 (1) 1624. Bibcode:2020NatCo..11.1624W. doi:10.1038/s41467-020-15453-z. PMC 7156390. PMID 32286257.
- Mi, Zhifu; Zheng, Jiali; Meng, Jing; et al. (2020). "Economic development and converging household carbon footprints in China". Nature Sustainability. 3 (7): 529–537. Bibcode:2020NatSu...3..529M. doi:10.1038/s41893-020-0504-y.
- Wei, Yi-Ming; Han, Rong; Liang, Qiao-Mei; et al. (2018). "An integrated assessment of INDCs under Shared Socioeconomic Pathways: an implementation of C3IAM". Natural Hazards. 92 (2): 585–618. Bibcode:2018NatHa..92..585W. doi:10.1007/s11069-018-3297-9.
- Yu, Biying; Wei, Yi-Ming; Gomi, Kei; Matsuoka, Yuzuru (2018). "Future scenarios for energy consumption and carbon emissions due to demographic transitions in Chinese households". Nature Energy. 3 (2): 109–118. Bibcode:2018NatEn...3..109Y. doi:10.1038/s41560-017-0053-4.
- Mi, Zhifu; Meng, Jing; Guan, Dabo; et al. (2017). "Chinese CO2 emission flows have reversed since the global financial crisis". Nature Communications. 8 (1) 1712. doi:10.1038/s41467-017-01820-w. PMC 5700086. PMID 29167467.

== Selected research grants ==
Wei has led research projects supported by the National Natural Science Foundation of China (NSFC), national research programmes, and other funding organizations. Selected projects include the following:

Project	Funding organization	Period	Funding (RMB million)	Role
Energy Transition and Climate Change	Basic Science Center Research Program supported by NSFC	2025–2029	50	Chief Scientist
Integrated Assessment of Economic Impacts of Climate Change and Its Applications	Major Program supported by NSFC	2022–2027	11.5	Chief Scientist
Key Technologies for Carbon Neutrality in Beijing Winter Olympics	National Key R&D Program	2020–2022	7.9	Chief Scientist
Energy Strategy and Climate Policy	Think-Tank Research Program supported by NSFC	2017–2018	1.9	Chief Scientist
Integrated Assessment of Economic Impacts of Climate Change	National Key R&D Program	2016–2021	24	Chief Scientist
Energy Economics and Climate Policy	National Innovation Research Team Program supported by NSFC	2015–2020	9	Chief Scientist / Team Leader
Policies Research on Carbon Budget	The CAS Strategic Priority Research Program Initiated by the Chinese Academy of Sciences	2012–2016	15	Chief Scientist
Low Carbon Development Strategy in YuChun of Helong Jiang Province	Low Carbon Development Strategy Program Initiated by National Development and Reform Commission	2013–2014	1.0	Chief Scientist
Analysis and Modelling Methods for Impacts of Climate Change on Vulnerability of Social Economic System and Their Application	Key International Collaboration Program Initiated by National Natural Science Foundation of China	2011–2013	1.66	Chief Scientist
Risk Evaluation and Decision Support System for Oversea Mineral Resources Exploitation	National Key S&T Program Initiated by State Ministry of Science and Technology of China	2007–2009	5.9	Chief Scientist
