= Sally Benson (professor) =

American hydrologist, engineer, and professor

Deputy Director of the Office of Science and Technology Policy
- In office January 20, 2021 – March 2023
- President: Joe Biden
- Succeeded by: Justina Gallegos

Personal details
- Education: Columbia University (BS); University of California, Berkeley (MS, PhD)

Sally Merrick Benson is a professor of energy engineering at Stanford University, and energy policy executive.

On November 24, 2021, Benson was appointed to be Deputy Executive Director of the White House's Office of Science and Technology Policy, leading a new OSTP Energy Division, and also holding the title as "Chief Strategist for the Energy Transition."

Benson has been an energy professor at Stanford since 2007, and in 2014, she was appointed the director of the Precourt Institute for Energy, the university's hub of energy research and education. Benson also leads Stanford's Global Climate and Energy Project (GCEP), a position she has had since 2007.

== Biography ==
Benson received a B.S. in geology from Barnard College of Columbia University, an M.Sc.and a Ph.D. in materials and mineral engineering from the University of California-Berkeley.

Benson has held several positions with the Lawrence Berkeley National Laboratory, Berkeley, California. These include 1980–2007, Staff scientist (director 1993–1997), Earth Sciences Division; 2001–2004, deputy director for operations; 1997–2001, Associate laboratory director, Energy Sciences.

== Awards and honours ==
Benson has won various awards, including the 2012 Greenman Award, Michel T. Halbouty Distinguished Lecture Award from the Geological Society, and the ARCS American Pacesetter Award. She was elected to the American Academy of Arts and Sciences in 2023 and to the Australian Academy of Technological Sciences & Engineering in 2024.

== See also ==
- Mark Z. Jacobson
- Tom Steyer
- Lee Schipper
- Al Gore
- Hermann Scheer
- Benjamin K. Sovacool
- John A. "Skip" Laitner
- Amory Lovins
- Daniel Kammen
- Renewable energy commercialization
