= WESC =

Swedish clothing brand

WeSC (short for "We are the Superlative Conspiracy") is a Swedish clothing brand that is primarily influenced by skateboarding and snowboarding. The company's CEO is Joseph Janus.

== Retail outlets ==
In 2009, WeSC signed an exclusive retail deal with Oved Apparel Corp for the latter to oversee all WeSC stores in the United States, with the exception of the New York City and Los Angeles locations. The company opened a concept store in Singapore in early 2012.

== We Activists ==
In July 2014, WESC had a group of sponsored individuals, skateboarders and musicians who were called "We Activists" by the company. Their sponsorship scheme has now ceased or is no longer made public.

=== Groups ===
- Looptroop Rockers
- Millencolin
- Steed Lord
- Teddybears

== See also ==
- Theodor Dalenson
