= 3 Mills Studios =

Film and television studio in London

Coordinates: 51°31′38″N 00°00′21″W

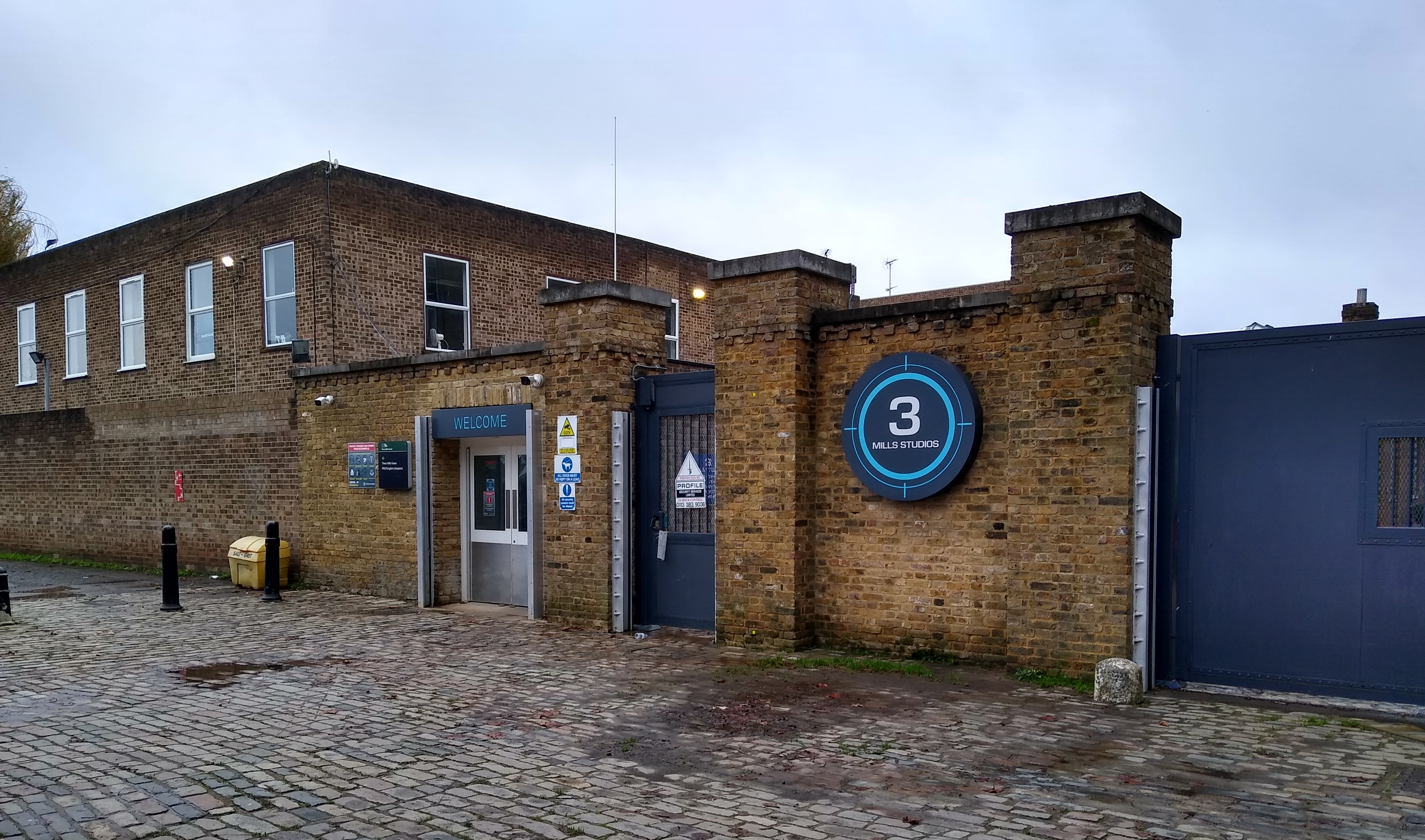
- 3 Mills Studios entrance

General information
- Location: London, England, Three Mill Lane, London, E3 3DU
- Opening: mid-1990s
- Owner: London Legacy Development Corporation

Website
- 3 Mills Studios

3 Mills Studios is a centre for film, television and theatre production near Stratford in East London, owned by the Lee Valley Regional Park Authority (LVRPA). The site of a former distillery in Three Mills became a dedicated centre for television and film production work with the establishment in the 1980s of Bow Studios, Three Mills Island Studios, and Edwin Shirley Productions. In the mid-1990s, the three studios merged to become 3 Mills Studios, under the management of Workspace Group.

In August 2004, the London Development Agency (LDA) acquired the lease of 3 Mills Studios. As parent organisation of the Creative London agency, the LDA's role included supporting business and skills, researching industry needs, and promoting London for film-making. The site is now one of London's most important film and television studios.

The lease transferred to the London Legacy Development Corporation in 2010 which is the organisation responsible for planning, developing, and managing the Olympic Park after the 2012 Summer Olympics.

== Facilities ==
3 Mills Studios has over 75,000 sq ft (7,000 m^{2}) of filming space, including 11 filming stages and nine rehearsal rooms. Stage 7 at 13,483 sq ft (1,252.6 m^{2}) is the largest, while Stage 2 at 3,219 sq ft (299.1 m^{2}) is the smallest.

Stage 5 at 10,437 sq ft (969.6 m^{2}) has a similar floor size to the Royal Albert Hall.

There are nine rehearsal rooms on site: Rehearsal Room 6 at 2,507 sq ft (232.9 m^{2}) is the largest and Rehearsal Room 3 at 280.9 sq ft (26.10 m^{2}) is the smallest.

3 Mills Studios has a large range of ancillary spaces including; production offices, props workshops, five prop stores ranging from 712 to 1,319 sq ft (66.1 to 122.5 m^{2}), make-up rooms, and dressing rooms.

== Credits ==
3 Mills Studios has become a hub for stop motion animation films and has hosted Wes Anderson's Isle of Dogs and Fantastic Mr Fox, as well as Tim Burton's Frankenweenie and Corpse Bride.

Many feature films have been made at 3 Mills Studios, including Legend, Topsy-Turvy, Sexy Beast, Eastern Promises, Attack the Block, Berberian Sound Studio, Ill Manors, Powder Room, Made in Dagenham, Never Let Me Go, Farming and Lock, Stock and Two Smoking Barrels.

Danny Boyle has also been known to frequently return to 3 Mills Studios and has shot several films at the studios including Sunshine, Trance, and 28 Days Later.

3 Mills Studios' main focus has been on television shows. Credits include RuPaul's Drag Race UK, Giri/Haji, The Third Day, The Great, Year of the Rabbit, Al Murray's Great British Pub Quiz, Cleaning Up, Luther, The Royals, The Rook, The Sound of Music Live, The Million Pound Drop Live, Stand Up to Cancer, Bad Girls and Jekyll and Hyde.

3 Mills Studios has been home to BBC's MasterChef since 2014.

3 Mills was home to Channel 4's Big Brother for the first and second series along with the first series of Celebrity Big Brother.

Many stars from the music world have rehearsed, filmed music videos, or advertising campaigns at 3 Mills Studios, including Little Mix, Calvin Harris, Pink, Dua Lipa, One Direction, Justin Bieber, Jessie J, Paloma Faith, Robbie Williams, Paul McCartney, Miley Cyrus, Beyoncé, George Michael, Kanye West, Lady Gaga, Katy Perry, Ellie Goulding and Olly Murs.

Other clients include Matthew Bourne's New Adventures, English National Opera, Raymond Gubbay Limited, Shakespeare's Globe and English National Ballet, as well as advertisers for Versace, Audi, Waitrose, Nissan, Gillette, Samsung, Gucci, Topshop, B&Q and Adidas.

3 Mills Studios also housed many rehearsals for the opening and closing ceremonies of the 2012 Summer Olympics.
