= Theodor Dalenson =

Theodor Dalenson, born 1959, is a Swedish venture capital investor, entrepreneur, gallerist and art collector.

== Biography ==
Theodor Dalenson studied law and philosophy at Stockholm University.

== Business career ==
Theodor has been involved in a number of public companies listed on the Nasdaq OMX stock exchange.

He started his business career as an advisor and associate of Frontiers International in 1983 and is still involved with the firm after 35 years. After a period of advising corporations on strategic planning both in the U.S. through William Kent International and through Mellanfonden, the government fund in Sweden, Theodor started AB Novestra in 1997, an investment firm which became a public company in 2000 on Stockholm stock exchange with Theodor Dalenson as chairman of the board. Novestra was an investor in E-trade Nordic, Framfab, Bredbandsbolaget, and QBranch, among other first-wave internet companies in the Nordics.

Through Nove Capital Management, he helped restructure and sell public Swedish companies such as Klippan AB, Pergo AB, Scribona AB, and Carl Lamm AB. He served as chairman of most of the entities he was involved in.

== Art Involvement ==
In the 1990s, Theodor Dalenson and his wife Isabella Dalenson ran the gallery and art advisory Carling Dalenson in Stockholm, Sweden and Naples, Florida. They exhibited Robert Rauschenberg, Robert Mangold, and Howard Hodgkin, among many others. After a long hiatus the gallery opened a new space in Stockholm in 2020. The gallery is family-owned and has produced solo-exhibitions with well established international artists such as Vera Lutter, Ugo Rondinone, Ian Davenport, Michael Craig-Martin, Jamie Nares, and Joel Shapiro.

Furthermore, Theodor and Isabella Dalenson have through Carling & Dalenson AB and the private initiative Art 4 Aid, been substantial benefactors of institutions such as Moderna Museet in Stockholm, Guggenheim Museum and Foundation, and Aspen Art Museum. Theodor Dalenson has served as a board member of the Guggenheim Foundation (New York), Aspen Art Museum, and Americans for the Arts (Washington). Moreover, he was the co-chairman of National Art Awards for 3 years during which he and Isabella Dalenson granted the Lifetime Achievement Award to, among others, James Rosenquist, BB King and Frank Stella. In addition, the couple have also made significant donations of art and exhibition contributions to Whitney Museum, Aspen Art Museum, Pérez Art Museum Miami (PAMM) and Parrish Art Museum in Water Mill, Long Island. Through Art 4 Aid, they have made significant donations to aid organizations such as UNICEF and Human Rights Watch.

== Conservation Involvement ==
Since 1983, Theodor Dalenson has been involved in fishery in numerous salmon rivers in Norway, including the Alta river. Throughout the 1980s he played a pivotal role when ALI, Alta Laksefiskeri Interessentskap, faced issues with conservation and tenants. Ivar Leinan, who was the longest serving chairman of ALI, stated at the 300-year anniversary (1725–2025) that Theodor Dalenson was the "Swede who saved the Alta river." Dalenson has helped reorganize and protect the Atlantic Salmon fisheries in general and especially on the Alta river after the hydro dam construction in Sautso. After being one of the head witnesses in the compensation matters against Statkraft, the hydro company on the Alta river, he spent the rest of the 1990s directing Alta towards the introduction of conservation efforts and catch limits as well as catch and release in all parts of the river. He later helped syndicate the sport fishing on the river and worked as an advisor to three chairmen of the ALI, Osvad Möllers, Lyon Holten, and the aforementioned Ivar Leinan, to help establish Alta as the foremost Atlantic salmon sport fishery in the world. He is the co-author of three books on the history of sport fishing on the Alta River. In the 1990s, he produced a documentary film about fishing on the Alta River named Alta the River, directed by Arne Naevra.

In 1993, his contributions helped start the first collection of historical artifacts at the Alta Museum (a UNESCO World Heritage Site). Theodor was elected to the board of the Atlantic Salmon Federation (US) and co-founded the North Atlantic Fund together with Orri Vigfusson in 1992.
