= Domscheit-Berg =

Domscheit-Berg is a German surname. Notable people with the surname include:

- Anke Domscheit-Berg (born 1968), German politician and activist
- Daniel Domscheit-Berg (born 1978), German technology activist
