= Felix Creutzig =

German physicist (born 1979)

- Born: November 1979 (age 46); Hanover, West Germany
- Education: Humboldt University of Berlin (2008, PhD in biophysics); University of Cambridge (2003, Master of Advanced Studies in Mathematics)
- Awards: Piers Sellers Prize (2017)
- Scientific career
- Fields: Biophysics
- Workplaces: Technische Universität Berlin; Mercator Research Institute on Global Commons and Climate Change

Felix Creutzig (born 1979) is a German physicist and professor of innovation and policy acceleration and Bennett Institute chair at the University of Sussex.. Previously, he was professor of sustainability economics at Technische Universität Berlin.

== Education ==
Creutzig was born in Hanover. He studied physics and medicine at the University of Freiburg from 1999 to 2002. As student of Trinity Hall, University of Cambridge, he obtained a Master of Advanced Studies (Part III of the Mathematical Tripos) in 2003. From 2003 until 2008, Felix Creutzig followed his doctoral studies at the Humboldt University of Berlin on "Sufficient encoding of dynamical systems" obtaining a PhD in biophysics.

== Academic career ==
Felix Creutzig worked as a postdoc at the Energy Resources Group at the University of California, Berkeley with Daniel Kammen and Lee Schipper. From 2009 until 2012 he was PI at the chair of Ottmar Edenhofer at Technische Universität Berlin, and visiting fellow at the Princeton Institute for International and Regional Studies collaborating with Robert H. Socolow. Since 2012, Felix Creutzig is PI at the Mercator Research Institute on Global Commons and Climate Change, now Potsdam Institute for Climate Impact Research. He was chair of sustainability economics of human settlements at TU Berlin from 2017 until 2024.

Felix Creutzig was coordinating lead author of the chapter on 'Demand, Services and Social Aspects of Mitigation' in the IPCC Sixth Assessment Report, lead author of the chapter on 'Transport' in the IPCC Fifth Assessment Report, and coordinator of the Annex on bioenergy. He is currently the lead author of the IPCC's Special Report on Cities.

Since 2022 he has been a member of Expert Advisory Board Climate Change Mitigation in Mobility of the Federal Ministry of Digital and Transport and a member of the Climate Advisory Board Berlin.

== Honors and awards ==
- Highly Cited Researchers 2022, 2023, 2024, 2025.
- 2017: Piers Sellers Prize
