= Cranbrook School, Kent =

Cranbrook School
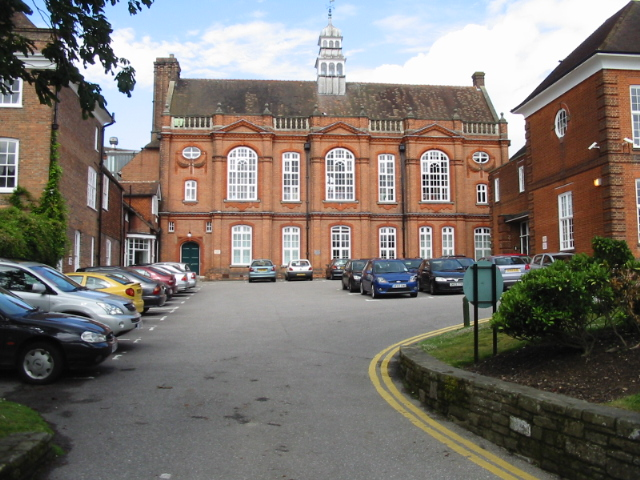
- Cranbrook School

Location
- Waterloo Road; Cranbrook, Kent, TN17 3JD; England; 51.0968°N 0.5382°E

Information
- Type: Boarding School; Grammar School; Academy
- Motto: Benignitas, Integritas, Curiositas, Aspiratio et Individualitas ('Kindness, Integrity, Curiosity, Aspiration and Individuality')
- Established: 1518
- Founder: John Blubery
- Department for Education URN: 137739 Tables
- Ofsted: Reports
- Headteacher: David Clark
- Gender: Coeducational
- Age: 11 to 18
- Colours: Maroon, Gold
- Website: https://www.cranbrookschool.co.uk/

Cranbrook School (formerly Queen Elizabeth's Grammar School) is a co-educational state boarding and day grammar school in the market town of Cranbrook, Kent, England. Selection is made of pupils at age 11 and 13.

== History ==
The school was founded in 1518 after the death of John Blubery, a yeoman of the King's Armoury. In his will he decreed that if the child of his daughter be a girl, then his mansion house be turned into a free school for the poor children of Cranbrook. Elizabeth I granted the school a royal charter in 1574, which is now housed in the library.

=== Recent history ===
In 2003 alumnus Piers Sellers, a NASA astronaut, took a copy of the school charter into space with him. A photo is exhibited in the school cafeteria. In 2005, Sellers opened the school's observatory, which is named after him. This observatory houses the 22.5-inch Alan Young telescope operated by the Cranbrook and District Science and Astronomy Society (CADSAS). In May 2010, Sellers took into outer space aboard the Space Shuttle an original watercolour portrait of Cranbrook School painted by Brenda Barratt. The painting was later returned to the school with official NASA verification that it has travelled into space. In 2018, a new day house specifically for the 120 students in Years 7 and 8 was named after Sellers, although now students from any grade can be in Sellers.

== Campus ==
=== Queen's Hall Theatre ===
The Queen's Hall Theatre was first opened in 1976; the original vision for the building was to provide a local community theatre which was funded by Cranbrook school, by the Education Authority and by Public subscription.

The subsequent refurbishment twenty years later in 1996 was financed by a generous grant from Tunbridge Wells Borough Council, the Lottery Agency and by the Governors of the School, to capitalise upon the venue’s ability to attract visiting Arts Companies of a high calibre to the local area.

Today the Queen's Hall Theatre provides a diverse range of professional shows to appeal to all ages and tastes within the Cranbrook community, such as live music events and The Cranbrook Comedy Club. As well as professional productions, The Cranbrook Operatic and Dramatic Society puts on 3 shows a year, whilst the school puts on a musical and a play each year, both are done to a high standard.

Seating a maximum of just over 350 people, The performance space is very flexible with adaptable seating allowing performances in the round, as well as on stage within the traditional proscenium arch.

The building is well equipped with state-of-the-art technical equipment and includes a large retractable cinema screen, a comprehensive lighting rig including intelligent moving fixtures, and a high-quality sound system.

There are two good-sized dressing rooms backstage as well as a classroom and green room which can double as extra-large dressing/band rooms when required.

=== Performing Arts Centre ===
The Performing Arts Centre (PAC) was opened in 2004. It contains the Wilkinson Studio, Music Practice Rooms, Vickers Auditorium, and Recording Studio. The PAC is used for drama and music lessons and is open to students for practice during break.

== Notable Old Cranbrookians ==
=== Military personnel ===
- General Sir John Akehurst, Deputy Supreme Allied Commander, Europe (1987–1990)
- Wing Commander Sir Norman Hulbert, Conservative MP for Stockport (1935–1950) and Stockport North (1950–1964)
- Air Chief Marshal Sir John Barraclough, station commander of RAF Biggin Hill (1954–1956)
- Wing Commander Hugh Kennard, aviator
- Colonel Mike Osborn, commander of the 22nd Special Air Service Regiment (1954–1955)
- Air Vice-Marshal Sir John Weston, station commander of RAF Halton (1952–1953)
- Brigadier-General Wallace Duffield Wright, recipient of the Victoria Cross

=== Academics ===
- Sir Tony Atkinson, professor of economics at the University of Oxford
- Henry Ford, professor of Arabic and principal of Magdalen Hall, Oxford
- Henri Gillet, professor of mathematics at the University of Illinois at Chicago
- Arthur Surridge Hunt, professor of papyrology at the University of Oxford
- Richard L. Hunter, Regius Professor of Greek at the University of Cambridge
- Sir Nicholas Shackleton, professor of quaternary palaeoclimatology at the University of Cambridge
- Annabel Gallop, head of the Southeast Asia Section at the British Library

=== Artists ===
- Emma Biggs, mosaic artist
- Henri Tebbitt, painter
- Es Devlin, artist and stage designer

=== Musicians ===
- Hugo Burnham, drummer for Gang of Four and associate professor at the New England Institute of Art
- Jon Cleary, Grammy award-winning musician
- Katie Kittermaster, singer-songwriter

=== Writers and journalists ===
- Louise Dean, novelist
- Hammond Innes, novelist
- Richard Barham Middleton, poet and short-story writer
- Karin Giannone, journalist and news presenter at BBC News
- Sir Charles Wheeler, journalist for the BBC
- Henry Shields, playwright
- Georgina Henry, journalist
- Jacqueline Winspear, novelist

=== Actors ===
- Stuart Organ, actor
- Caspar Phillipson, actor

=== Clergymen ===
- Canon John Collins, political campaigner
- The Venerable Alfred Daldy, Archdeacon of Winchester

=== Athletes ===
- Phil Edmonds, cricketer
- Ruaridh McConnochie, Olympic silver medal-winning member of the Great Britain national rugby sevens team
- John Bluett, cricketer

=== Diplomats ===
- Sir David Muirhead, Ambassador to Peru (1967–1970), Portugal (1970–1974) and Belgium (1974–1978)
- Vijay Rangarajan, Ambassador to Brazil (2017–2020)

=== Other ===
- Michael Croucher, TV film producer
- Barry Davies, sports commentator
- Harry Hill, comedian
- Sir Victor Horsley, neurosurgeon
- Kevin Lygo, television executive and Channel 4 Director of Television and Content
- Brian Moore, football commentator
- Tony Nicklinson, right-to-die campaigner
- Richard Pilbrow, theatre producer
- William Rootes, 1st Baron Rootes, co-founder of the Rootes Group
- Piers Sellers, astronaut
- Edwin Shirley, rock and roll tour organiser
- Sir Tim Smit, co-founder of the Eden Project
- Peter West, television presenter
- Sarah Keith-Lucas, meteorologist

== See also ==
- Cranbrook Schools, a private school in Bloomfield Hills, Michigan, named after the town of Cranbrook, Kent. It has an exchange programme with Cranbrook School, Kent.
- Cranbrook School, Sydney, an independent, day and boarding school for boys in Sydney, New South Wales, originated in 'Cranbrook House', the family home of the Tooth brewing family of Cranbrook, Kent, and Sydney
