= Poschmann =

Poschmann is a German surname. Notable people with the surname include:

- Adolf Poschmann (1885–1977), German educator, historian and author
- Agathe Poschmann (born 1922), German actress
- Aloys Poschmann (1909–1980), German psychiatrist
- Bernhard Poschmann (1878–1955), German Catholic clergyman
- Brigitte Poschmann (1932–2008), German archivist and historian
- Christian Poschmann (1979), German American football player
- Katja Poschmann (1980), German politician
- Henri Poschmann (1932–2022), German literary scholar
- Marion Poschmann (born 1969), German author, novelist, and poet
- Sabine Poschmann (born 1968), German politician
- Thomas Puschmann, German academic
- Thomas Puschmann, German footballer
- Wolf-Dieter Poschmann (1951–2021), German athlete and sports presenter
