= Anke Domscheit-Berg =

German politician and activist

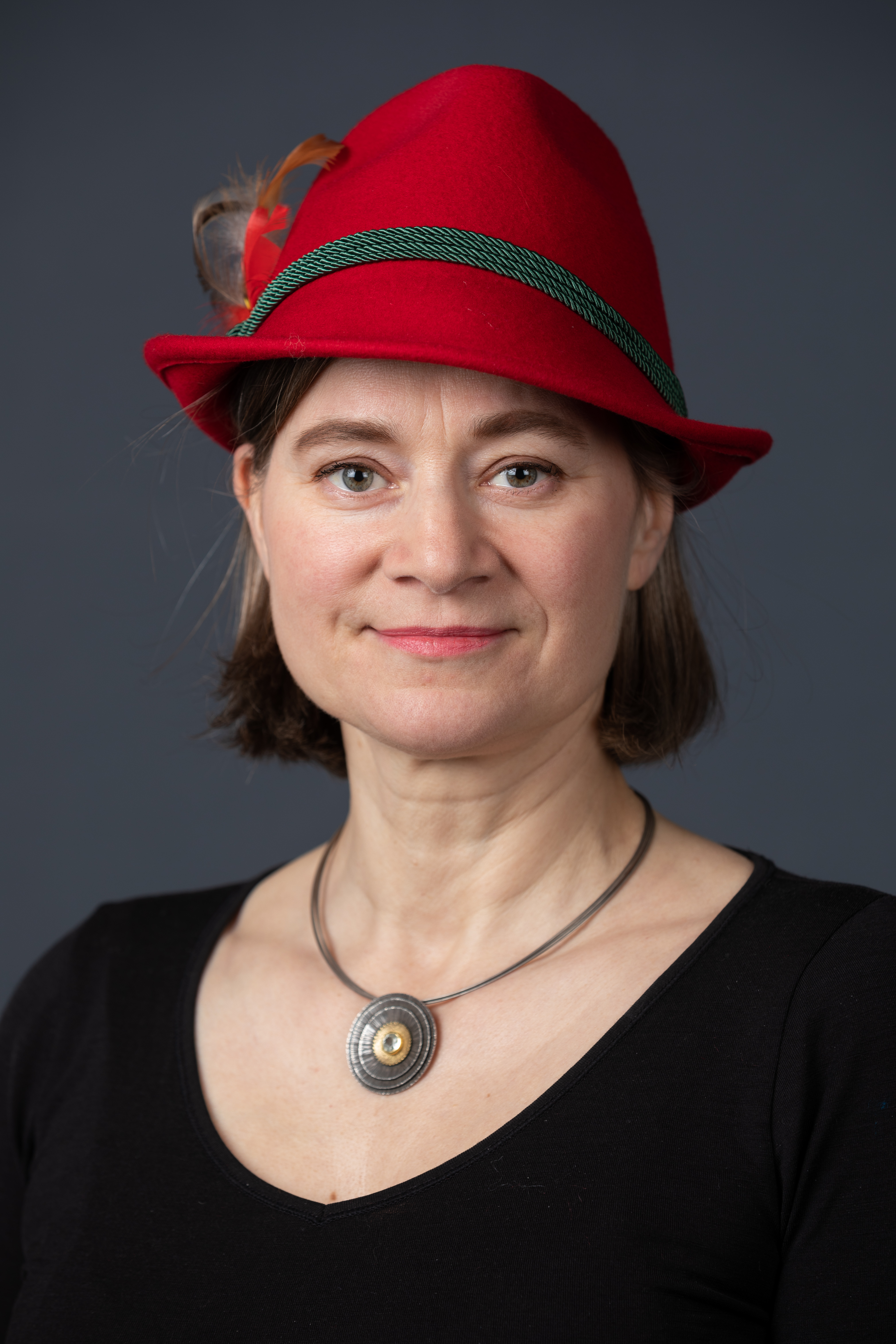
- Domscheit-Berg in 2020

Member of the Bundestag
- In office 24 October 2017 – 25 March 2025

Personal details
- Born: 17 February 1968 (age 58) Premnitz, East Germany (now Germany)
- Party: The Left
- Spouse: Daniel Domscheit-Berg
- Children: 1

Anke Domscheit-Berg (née Domscheit; born 17 February 1968 in Premnitz) is a German politician and activist. She was a member of the Bundestag from 2017 to 2025. In 2017, she was elected on the party list of The Left, without being a party member. She joined the party in 2021 following her nomination to the top female position on the party election list in the state of Brandenburg. Her mandate ended in 2025 because she did not run for re-election. Previously, she was a member of the Pirate Party Germany and the Greens. She is married to Daniel Domscheit-Berg.

== Life ==
Anke Domscheit-Berg grew up as daughter of an art historian and a doctor in Müncheberg, East Germany. She has a sister and two brothers. Domscheit-Berg attended a polytechnic secondary school, before transferring to an extended secondary school in Strausberg to sit the Abitur examination. In 1987 she began studying textile art in Schneeberg, Saxony. Following German reunification, she worked for three years to finance her further studies. In 1993 she began studying business economics at the International Business School in Bad Homburg vor der Höhe, specialising in political economy and international economic relationships as well as the Spanish language. In 1996 she gained a Bachelor of Arts - International Business Administration degree and in the same year completed a Master of Business Administration degree at Northumbria University.

After graduating she worked as a management consultant at professional services companies Accenture and McKinsey. From 2008 to 2011, Domscheit-Berg was active as a lobbyist for Microsoft in Germany. Following that, she was self-employed as a writer and businesswoman. In 2016 she founded ViaEuropa Deutschland together with Daniel Domscheit-Berg and Jonas Birgersson. The company aims to promote the decentralised development of fibre-optic networks in Germany. In 2017, she stepped down from the position of managing director.

In 2010 she was an honorary supervisory board member of Teach First Deutschland. She was a freelance policy advisor at the World Future Council on the topic of violence against women and girls and an honorary member of the think-tank of the German NGO Welthungerhilfe. In 2015 she was a member of the jury for the Deutscher Reporterpreis.

From June–October 2017 she worked part-time as a research assistant to Petra Sitte, a member of the German Bundestag.

In 2000, Domscheit-Berg gave birth to a son. After separating from the father, she was a single mother for a while. In 2010 she married Daniel Berg. She lives in Fürstenberg/Havel.

== Political career ==
Anke Domscheit-Berg was a member of Alliance 90/The Greens in the Mitte borough of Berlin. In May 2012 she joined the Pirate Party Germany. From August 2013 to July 2014, Domscheit-Berg was chair of the Pirate Party in Brandenburg.

In the 2013 German federal election, Domscheit-Berg was second on the Pirates' party list in Brandenburg, and also stood as a direct candidate in the single-member constituency of Oberhavel – Havelland II. In the 2014 European Parliament election, she was third on the Pirate Party's national party list. She was however unsuccessful in both elections.

In September 2014, Domscheit-Berg left the Pirate Party. In the 2017 German federal election, she stood as a candidate for The Left in the constituency of Brandenburg an der Havel – Potsdam-Mittelmark I – Havelland III – Teltow-Fläming I, without being a party member, as well as taking third place on the party list of The Left in Brandenburg. She was defeated in the constituency by CDU candidate Dietlind Tiemann, but was elected as a member of the Bundestag via the party list. She is the chair of the Left group in the Bundestag's 'Digital Agenda' committee.

Domscheit-Berg is chairwoman of the Left Party in the "Digital Agenda" committee and deputy member of the committees on education, research, technology impacts, transport and digital infrastructure, and the "Artificial Intelligence" Commission of Inquiry. On 24 April 2021, she announced her entry into the Left Party, but only after she won the election for the top places on the Brandenburg state list. She wanted to avoid the false impression that it was tactically motivated to promote her candidacy. In the 2021 federal election, she entered the Bundestag via second place on the Left Party's Brandenburg state list. Domscheit-Berg will not run again in the 2025 federal election.

== Commitment to gender equality ==
Anke Domscheit-Berg is committed to gender equality in all areas of society. In lectures, workshops and publications, she campaigns against sexism, violence against girls and women and unequal treatment in the workplace and politics.

In 2007, Anke Domscheit-Berg worked as an IT strategy consultant at McKinsey & Company. She was the project manager of the study 'A Wake Up Call for Female Leadership in Europe', which analysed the career opportunities of female managers. The study was presented at the 'Global Summit of Women' in Berlin in 2007, a conference at which 900 professionally successful women from all over the world shared their experiences. She also worked on the Women Matter study, which focussed on the influence of top female executives on corporate success.

She was a founding member of the initiative FidAR (Frauen in die Aufsichtsräte), which campaigns for a statutory quota for women on supervisory boards and from 2003 to 2010 she was a member of the extended board of the non-partisan women's initiative Berlin - Stadt der Frauen. In 2009, she signed the Nuremberg Resolution for more women in management positions and actively supported it.

In a commentary in the Berlin Daily newspaper in 2009, due to the 2008 financial crisis, she addressed the call for more women in management positions, which she said had gained a new weight and a completely different meaning' because of the crisis. Domscheit-Berg called for a 'gender equality law for the private sector and a gender quota for supervisory boards.' In an article for the weekly newspaper Die Zeit a few months later, she described her own experiences as a mother and manager, which led her to become involved in women's networks such as the European Women's Management Development Network. Domscheit-Berg also trained female managers at large companies and gave lectures on the topic at universities.

She also played a leading role in the #aufschrei debate on everyday sexism in Germany, which was sparked in January 2013 and called for the search for new models for gender roles.

In 2017, she co-initiated Der Goldene Zaunpfahl, a negative award for 'absurd gender marketing'.

== Open government and network security ==
Anke Domscheit-Berg is co-founder of the 'Government 2.0 Network Germany' and is thus in favour of Open Government, i.e. opening up government and administration to the public. Web 2.0 technologies can also be used for this purpose. She is calling for public administration data, provided it is not personal or security-relevant, to be accessible on the Internet without a licence and in machine-readable form (Open Government Data). She took part in the Federal Minister of the Interior's 'Net Dialogue', a series of round tables in which Thomas de Maizière discussed the prospects for net policy in Germany with a panel of experts in 2010.

In this context, she was the initiator of the Government 2.0 Camp in Germany, which took place for the first time in 2009 and led to the founding of the Gov20 network. In 2011, it took place for the third time under the name Open Government Camp in Berlin.

She is also active in the action platform 'Berlin Open Data' and was a jury member of the first German apps competition, Apps4Berlin, as well as the EU Open Data Challenge.

She is one of the supporters of the Charter of Fundamental Digital Rights of the European Union, which was published at the end of November 2016.

To improve information security, she is calling for the Federal Office for Information Security (BSI) to act independently of the Federal Ministry of the Interior (BMI). In her opinion, the BMI could otherwise come into a conflict of interest with the BSI about the work of the federal intelligence services.

== Attitude towards WikiLeaks ==
Anke Domscheit-Berg has been married to former WikiLeaks spokesperson and author Daniel Domscheit-Berg, who wanted to set up his revelation platform with OpenLeaks, since summer 2010. On Deutschlandfunk radio in 2010, she described her fundamentally positive but also critical attitude towards WikiLeaks. She welcomed the fact that WikiLeaks is working towards the goal of transparent governments and states by publishing government documents and explained details about the authentication of the documents sent to WikiLeaks. She regretted that there is no term with a positive connotation in German that corresponds to the English 'whistleblower'. However, she also appealed to the conscience and responsibility of those who publish secret documents and did not see a conflict of interest with her work at Microsoft, as they were both concerned with transparency.

The couple supports the Icelandic Initiative on Modern Media (IMMI), which is primarily intended to legally protect investigative online journalism such as that carried out by Wikileaks. The genesis of the IMMI is closely linked to WikiLeaks.

== Award ==
In 2010 she received the Berliner Frauenpreis, which the Senate has been awarding since 1988. The Senate stated on its website: 'The manager and lobbyist for women Anke Domscheit received the 2010 Women's Prize for her many years of professional, political and journalistic commitment to the networking of women and the promotion of equality in business.' Harald Wolf, Senator for Economics, Technology and Women's Issues, said: 'She brought the Global Summit of Women, the World Summit of Women, to Berlin in 2007. Women from almost 90 countries came to Berlin, forged alliances, and established networks - as representatives of politics, non-governmental organisations and companies."

== Bibliography ==
- Mauern einreißen! Weil ich glaube, dass wir die Welt verändern können. (Break down walls! Because I believe we can change the world.) Heyne Verlag, Munich 2014, ISBN 978-3-453-20042-5
- Ein bisschen gleich ist nicht genug! Warum wir von Geschlechtergerechtigkeit noch weit entfernt sind. Ein Weckruf. (Some equality is not enough! Why we are still a long way from gender equality. A wake-up call.) Heyne Verlag, Munich 2015, ISBN 978-3-453-60311-0
