= Ostprignitz-Ruppin III/Havelland II =

State electoral district of Germany

4: Ostprignitz-Ruppin III/Havelland III
- Electoral district for the Landtag of Brandenburg
- Ostprignitz-Ruppin III/Havelland IIIin 2024
- District: Ostprignitz-Ruppin and Havelland
- Electorate: 44,940 (2024)
- Major settlements: Rathenow and Premnitz

Current electoral district
- Created: 1994
- Party: AfD
- Member: Kai Berger

Ostprignitz-Ruppin III/Havelland III is an electoral constituency (German: Wahlkreis) represented in the Landtag of Brandenburg. It elects one member via first-past-the-post voting. Under the constituency numbering system, it is designated as constituency 4. It is located in the Ostprignitz-Ruppin district.

== Geography ==
The constituency includes the towns of Rathenow and Premnitz, as well as the community of Milower Land and Wusterhausen/Dosse, and the administrative divisions of Neustadt (Dosse) and Rhinow.

There were 44,940 eligible voters in 2024.

== Members ==
Election	Member	Party	%
2004	Christian Görke	PDS	38.8
2009	Christian Görke	Left	39.1
2014	Christian Görke	Left	32.0
2019	Katja Poschmann	SPD	24.9
2024	Kai Berger	AfD	35.0

== Election results ==
=== 2024 election ===
State election (2024): Ostprignitz-Ruppin III / Havelland III
Notes:	Blue background denotes the winner of the electorate vote. Pink background denotes a candidate elected from their party list. Yellow background denotes an electorate win by a list member, or other incumbent. A ✓ or ✗ denotes status of any incumbent, win or lose respectively.						
Party	Candidate	Votes	%	±%	Party votes	%	±%
AfD	Kai Berger	10,462	35.0	▲11.0	9,778	32.5	▲7.5
SPD	✗ Katja Poschmann	10,242	34.2	▲9.3	9,490	31.6	▲4.2
BSW					3,990	13.3	
CDU	Gursch	4,798	16.0	▼0.9	3,635	12.1	▼4.4
Left	Freimuth	1,827	6.1	▼14.3	855	2.8	▼10.7
BVB/FW	Kubale	1,360	4.5	▼0.6	509	1.7	▼1.7
DLW	Essig	636	2.1		257	0.9	
Greens	von Fricks	347	1.2	▼4.3	634	2.1	▼5.1
Tierschutzpartei					502	1.7	▼0.5
FDP	Ottmanns	239	0.8	▼2.2	158	0.5	▼3.1
Plus					151	0.5	▼0.6
Values					55	0.2	
Third Way					39	0.1	
DKP					13	0.0	
Informal votes		403			248		
Total valid votes		29,911			30,066		
Turnout		30,314	67.5	▲11.0			
AfD gain from SPD	Majority	220	0.8				

=== 2019 election ===
State election (2019): Ostprignitz-Ruppin III/Havelland III
Notes:	Blue background denotes the winner of the electorate vote. Pink background denotes a candidate elected from their party list. Yellow background denotes an electorate win by a list member, or other incumbent. A ✓ or ✗ denotes status of any incumbent, win or lose respectively.						
Party	Candidate	Votes	%	±%	Party votes	%	±%
SPD	Katja Poschmann	6,490	24.9	▼1.1	7,128	27.4	▼4.2
AfD	Kai Berger	6,239	24.0	▲13.6	6,517	25.0	▲14.2
Left	✗ Christian Görke	5,317	20.4	▼11.6	3,527	13.5	▼10.4
CDU	Dieter Dombrowski	4,418	17.0	▼8.3	4,288	16.5	▼6.8
Greens	Stefan Behrens	1,429	5.5	▲2.5	1,877	7.2	▲3.7
BVB/FW	Uwe Litfin	1,351	5.2	▲3.0	892	3.4	▲2.1
FDP	Christian Engelland	772	3.0		939	3.6	▲2.1
Tierschutzpartei					558	2.1	
Pirates					198	0.8	▼0.4
ÖDP					81	0.3	
V-Partei3					39	0.1	
Informal votes		347			319		
Total valid votes		26,016			26,044		
Turnout		26,363	56.5	▲13.0			
SPD gain from Left	Majority	251	0.9				

=== 2014 election ===
State election (2014): Ostprignitz-Ruppin III/Havelland III
Notes:	Blue background denotes the winner of the electorate vote. Pink background denotes a candidate elected from their party list. Yellow background denotes an electorate win by a list member, or other incumbent. A ✓ or ✗ denotes status of any incumbent, win or lose respectively.						
Party	Candidate	Votes	%	±%	Party votes	%	±%
Left	✓ Christian Görke	6,607	32.0	▼7.1	4,960	23.9	▼7.1
SPD	Martin Gorholt	5,364	26.0	▲0.8	6,548	31.6	▼2.1
CDU	Dieter Dombrowski	5,221	25.3	▲2.6	4,832	23.3	▲3.4
AfD	Kai Berger	2,156	10.4		2,240	10.8	
Greens	Petra Budke	613	3.0	▼0.1	718	3.5	▲0.3
NPD					529	2.6	▼0.4
FDP					305	1.5	▼4.6
BVB/FW	Uwe Litfin	449	2.2	▲0.6	277	1.3	▲0.3
Pirates	René Streich	257	1.2		240	1.2	
REP					51	0.2	Steady
DKP					23	0.1	Steady
Informal votes		356			300		
Total valid votes		20,667			20,723		
Turnout		21,023	43.5	▼20.3			
Left hold	Majority	1,243	6.0				

=== 2009 election ===
State election (2009): Ostprignitz-Ruppin III/Havelland III
Notes:	Blue background denotes the winner of the electorate vote. Pink background denotes a candidate elected from their party list. Yellow background denotes an electorate win by a list member, or other incumbent. A ✓ or ✗ denotes status of any incumbent, win or lose respectively.						
Party	Candidate	Votes	%	±%	Party votes	%	±%
Left	✓ Christian Görke	12,280	39.1	▲0.3	9,816	31.0	▲0.4
SPD	Martin Gorholt	7,913	25.2	▲2.7	10,665	33.7	▲1.9
CDU	Dieter Dombrowski	7,146	22.7	▼1.4	6,292	19.9	▲0.5
FDP	Torsten Bathmann*	1,566	5.0	▼1.2	1,934	6.1	▲2.2
NPD	Dieter Brose	1,050	3.3		951	3.0	
Greens	Peter Masloch	978	3.1	Steady	1,023	3.2	▲0.8
BVB/FW	Uwe Litfin	489	1.6		323	1.0	
DVU					243	0.8	▼5.0
RRP					153	0.5	
50Plus					103	0.3	▼0.7
Die-Volksinitiative					60	0.2	
REP					51	0.2	
DKP					28	0.1	Steady
Informal votes		916			696		
Total valid votes		31,422			31,642		
Turnout		32,338	63.8	▲9.8			
Left hold	Majority	4,367	13.9	▼2.4			

- FDP candidate Torsten Bathmann won election via the FDP state list, but refused his mandate and did not take his seat.

=== 2004 election ===
State election (2004): Ostprignitz-Ruppin III/Havelland III
Notes:	Blue background denotes the winner of the electorate vote. Pink background denotes a candidate elected from their party list. Yellow background denotes an electorate win by a list member, or other incumbent. A ✓ or ✗ denotes status of any incumbent, win or lose respectively.						
Party	Candidate	Votes	%	±%	Party votes	%	±%
PDS	Christian Görke	10,745	38.75		8,539	30.56	
CDU	Dieter Dombrowski	6,685	24.11		5,427	19.42	
SPD	Manfred Lenz	6,234	22.48		8,893	31.82	
DVU					1,622	5.80	
FDP	Sybille Heling	1,723	6.21		1,078	3.86	
Greens	Monika Schilling	870	3.14		661	2.37	
Familie					592	2.12	
50Plus					278	0.99	
AfW (Free Voters)	Erhard Löser	863	3.11		229	0.82	
The Grays – Gray Panthers					185	0.66	
Yes Brandenburg	Martin Winterlich	607	2.19		168	0.60	
BRB					117	0.42	
AUB-Brandenburg					94	0.34	
DKP					33	0.12	
Schill					28	0.10	
Informal votes		744			527		
Total valid votes		27,727			27,944		
Turnout		28,471	53.97				
PDS win new seat	Majority	4,060	14.64				

== See also ==
- Politics of Brandenburg
- Landtag of Brandenburg
