= Brenda Barratt =

English watercolour painter

Brenda Barratt (born 1946) is an English watercolour painter, particularly of architecture.

Born in Woodford Green, Barratt specialises in architectural subjects as well as gardens and landscapes. She works from her studio in Buxted, East Sussex. Brenda gets commissioned to capture the essence of various schools and colleges in England such as Hurstpierpoint College, Great Walstead School, Burgess Hill Girls School and Brighton College. She produces limited edition prints and donates the original to the school. Collectors from around the world have bought Brenda's architectural watercolors.

Barratt comes from a long line of professional artists and has been painting architectural subjects for over twenty years. Her father, Chris Rooke, was commissioned to paint watercolours of important buildings thought likely not to survive World War II. One of his paintings is in the custody of the Victoria and Albert Museum.

== Barratt's painting on Space Shuttle ==
In May 2010 NASA astronaut Piers Sellers took an original watercolor portrait painted by Brenda Barratt into outer space aboard the Space Shuttle Atlantis flying its last mission, STS-132. Piers Sellers was a pupil at Cranbrook School, in Kent, and Brenda Barratt was asked by Angela Daly, the school's headteacher, to paint a watercolor of the school. The painting was then returned to Cranbrook School with the official NASA verification that it had travelled into space.

== Schools where Brenda Barratt's paintings are displayed ==
- Adams' Grammar School, Newport, Shropshire, England
- Ardingly College, West Sussex, England
- Arnold School, Blackpool, Lancashire, England
- Brighton College, Brighton, England
- Broadwater School, Surrey, England
- Buckswood School, East Sussex, England
- Burgess Hill School, West Sussex, England
- Caterham School, Surrey, England
- Cranbrook School, Kent, England
- Great Walstead School, Lindfield, West Sussex, England
- Handcross Park School, Haywards Heath, West Sussex, England
- Hawthorns School, Bletchingley, Surrey, England
- Hilden Grange School, Tonbridge, Kent, England
- Holmewood House School, Kent, England
- Hurstpierpoint College, West Sussex, England
- Kent College, Kent, England
- Lewes Old Grammar School, Lewes, East Sussex, England
- Malvern St James College, Worcestershire, England.
- Moira House School, Eastbourne, England
- Old Swinford Hospital, Stourbridge, England
- Reigate Grammar School, Surrey, England
- Sexey's School, Bruton, Somerset, England
- The Skinners' School, Kent, England
- St Andrew’s School, Eastbourne, England
- St. Bartholomew's School, Berkshire, England
- St Joseph's Collegel, Reading, Berkshire, England
- St Paul's School, London, England (architect: Alfred Waterhouse)
- St Swithun's School, Winchester, England
- Stoke Brunswick School, Ashurst Wood, West Sussex, England
- Tunbridge Wells Girls Grammar School, Kent, England
- Woldingham School, Surrey, England
