= Katja Poschmann =

German politician (born 1980)

- Poschmann in 2025

Member of the Landtag of Brandenburg
- Incumbent
- Assumed office 25 September 2019
- Preceded by: Christian Görke
- Constituency: Ostprignitz-Ruppin III/Havelland II (2019–2024)

Personal details
- Born: 27 March 1980 (age 46)
- Party: Social Democratic Party (since 2015)

Katja Poschmann (born 27 March 1980) is a German politician serving as a member of the Landtag of Brandenburg since 2019. From 2019 to 2024, she served as speaker of the city council of Premnitz.
