= Piers Sellers =

British-American astronaut (1955–2016)

Piers Sellers OBE
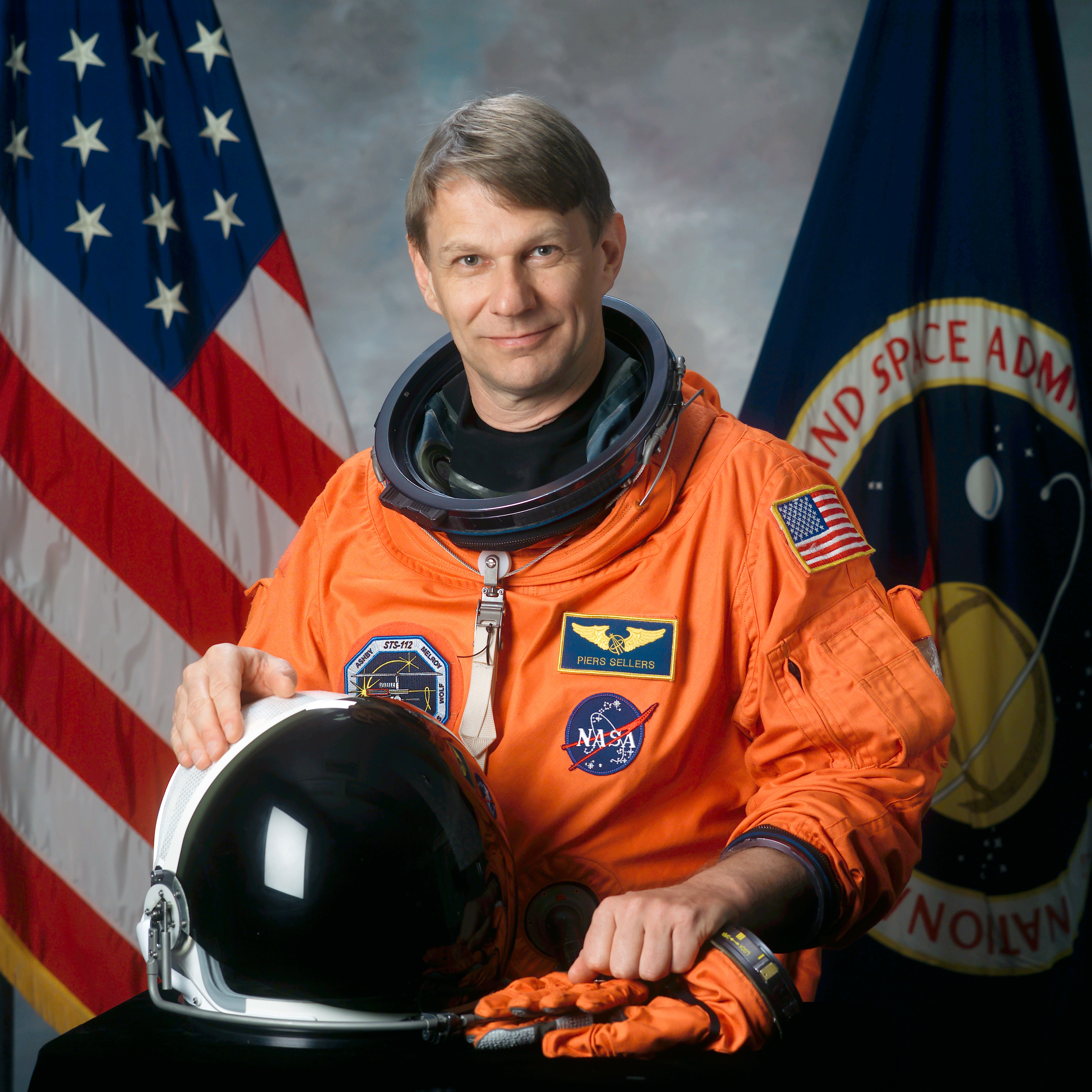
- Born: Piers John Sellers; 11 April 1955; Crowborough, Sussex, England
- Died: 23 December 2016 (aged 61); Houston, Texas, U.S.
- Education: University of Edinburgh (BSc); University of Leeds (PhD)
- Space career

NASA astronaut
- Time in space: 35d 9h 2m
- Selection: NASA Group 16 (1996)
- Total EVAs: 6
- Total EVA time: 41h 10m
- Missions: STS-112; STS-121; STS-132
- Scientific career
- Fields: Meteorology
- Thesis: Vegetation Type and Catchment Water Balance: A Simulation Study (1981)

Piers John Sellers OBE (11 April 1955 – 23 December 2016) was a British-American meteorologist, NASA astronaut and Director of the Earth Science Division at NASA/GSFC. He was a veteran of three Space Shuttle missions. Sellers attended Cranbrook School, Cranbrook, Kent, United Kingdom, until 1973, and achieved a bachelor's degree in ecological science from the University of Edinburgh in 1976. In 1981 he gained a doctorate in biometeorology from the University of Leeds. In 2011, Sellers retired from the NASA Astronaut Corps.

Before joining the astronaut corps, Sellers worked at NASA Goddard Space Flight Center on research into how the Earth's biosphere and atmosphere interact. This work involved climate system computer modelling and field work utilising aircraft, satellites and ground support input.

== Personal life and death ==
Sellers was born in Crowborough, Sussex, the second born of five boys for mother Lindsey. His education started at Tyttenhanger Lodge Pre-preparatory School in Seaford, East Sussex, and Cranbrook School, Kent, from which he graduated in 1973 and where he was trained as a Royal Air Force cadet to pilot gliders and powered aircraft. He earned a Bachelor of Science degree in ecological science from the University of Edinburgh and a doctorate in biometeorology from the University of Leeds. Sellers married Amanda Lomas, a nurse from Hebden Bridge, Yorkshire, before they moved to the US. This marriage ended in divorce.

Sellers appeared in the Leonardo DiCaprio-produced documentary film Before the Flood.

In January 2016, he revealed that he had been diagnosed with stage 4 pancreatic cancer. Sellers died on 23 December 2016 at the age of 61.

== Career ==
Sellers and his wife left the UK in 1982, moving to the United States, where he began his NASA career as a research meteorologist at Goddard Space Flight Center in Greenbelt, Maryland. Sellers' work in the field of meteorology focused primarily on computer modelling of climate systems, but he maintained his aircraft pilot skills. Sellers began applying annually to become an astronaut in 1984, but his lack of US citizenship was a problem. In 1991 he became a naturalized citizen of the United States.

== NASA career ==
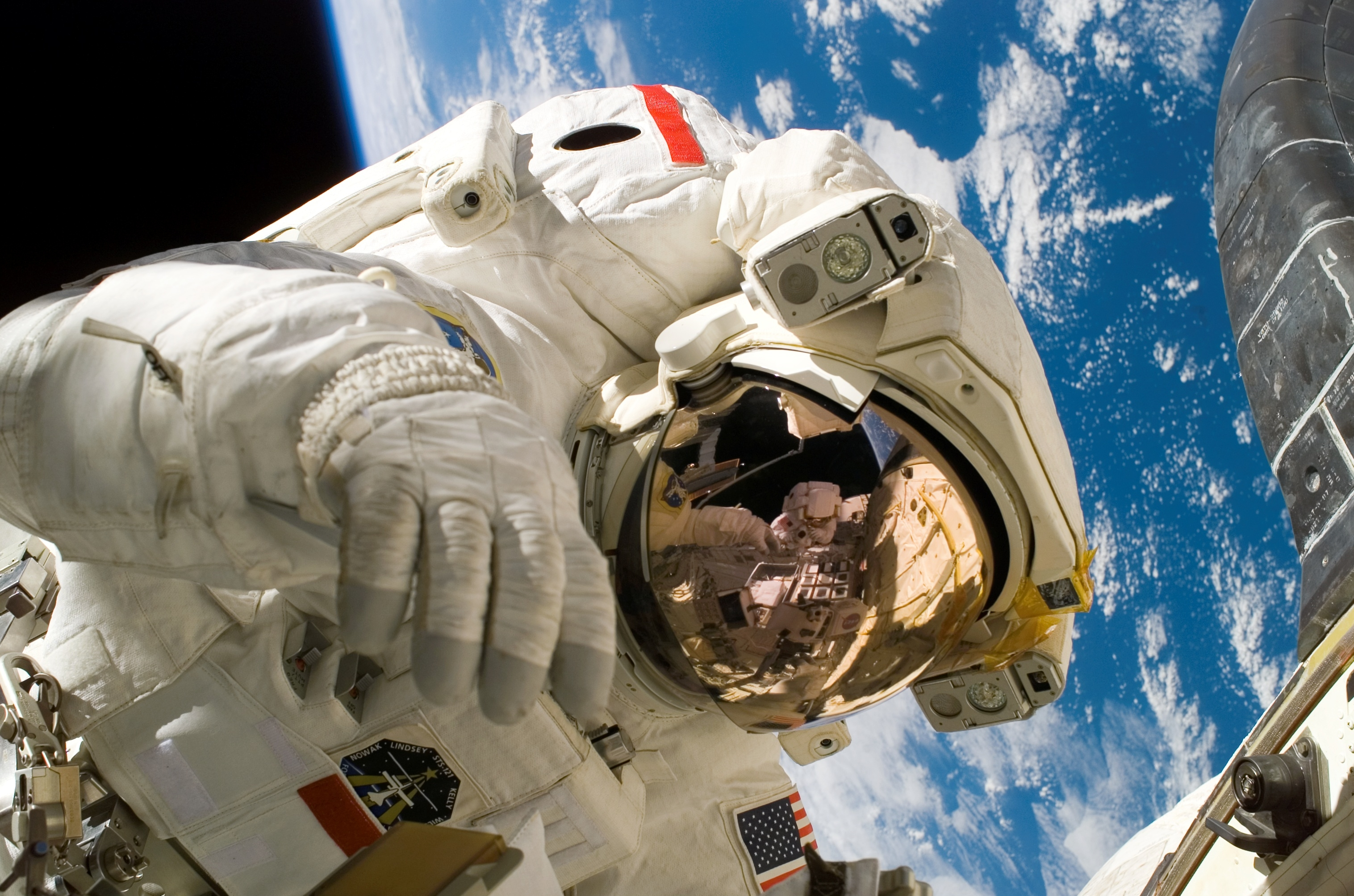
Sellers performing a spacewalk during STS-121

Selected as an astronaut candidate by NASA in April 1996, Sellers reported to the NASA Johnson Space Center in August 1996. He completed two years of training and evaluation and was initially assigned technical duties in the Astronaut Office Computer Support Branch, followed by service in the Astronaut Office Space Station Branch. During that time, he worked part-time in Moscow as a technical liaison on ISS computer software. Sellers logged over 559 hours in space, including almost 41 EVA hours in 6 spacewalks. He retired as an astronaut in 2011 and then served as deputy director of sciences and exploration at NASA's Goddard Space Flight Center in Greenbelt, Md.

=== Spaceflight experience ===
STS-112 Space Shuttle Atlantis (7–18 October 2002) was an International Space Station assembly mission during which the crew conducted joint operations with the Expedition-5 in delivering and installing the S-One Truss (the third piece of the station's 11-piece Integrated Truss Structure). To outfit and activate the new component, Sellers performed three spacewalks and logged a total of 19 hours and 41 minutes of EVA. The crew also transferred cargo between the two vehicles and used the shuttle's thruster jets during two manoeuvres to raise the station's orbit. STS-112 was the first shuttle mission to use a camera on the External Tank, providing a live view of the launch to flight controllers and NASA TV viewers. The mission was accomplished in 170 orbits, travelling 4.5 million miles in 10 days, 19 hours, and 58 minutes.

STS-121 Space Shuttle Discovery (4–17 July 2006) was a return-to-flight test mission and assembly flight to the International Space Station. During the 13-day flight, the crew of Discovery tested new equipment and procedures that increased the safety of space shuttles, and produced never-before-seen, high-resolution images of the Shuttle during and after its 4 July launch. The crew also performed maintenance on the space station and delivered and transferred more than 28,000 pounds of supplies and equipment, and a new Expedition 13 crew member to the station. Sellers and Mike Fossum performed three EVAs to test the 50-foot robotic arm boom extension as a work platform. They removed and replaced a cable that provides power, command and data and video connections to the station's mobile transporter rail car. They also tested techniques for inspecting and repairing the reinforced carbon-carbon segments that protect the shuttle's nose cone and leading edge of the wings. The STS-121 mission was accomplished in 306 hours, 37 minutes and 54 seconds.

Sellers brought a velvet patch of the University of Edinburgh crest into space on this flight, which was sewn to the graduating bonnet used during the university's graduation ceremonies.

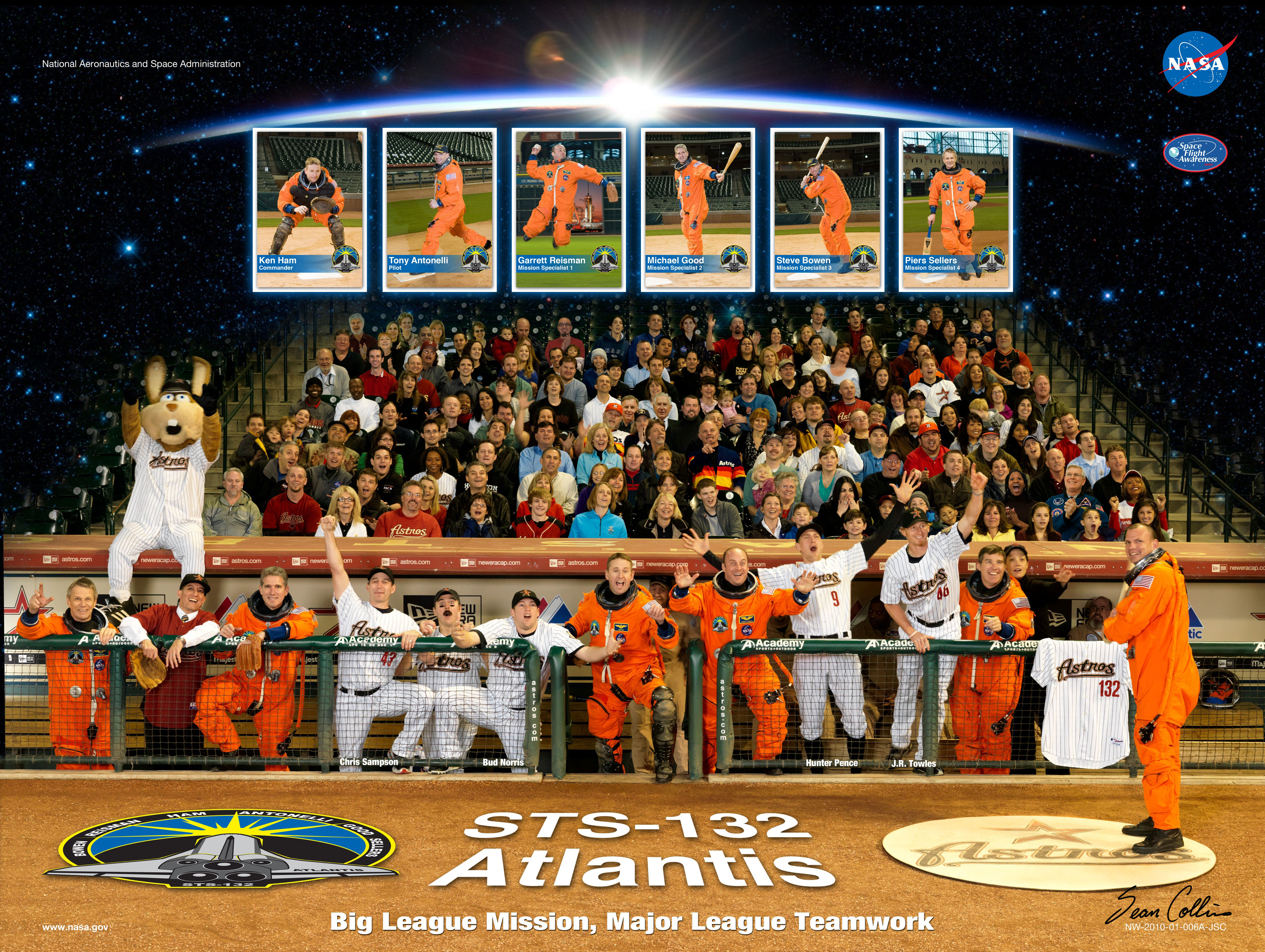
STS-132 mission poster

STS-132 Space Shuttle Atlantis (14–26 May 2010) was an International Space Station assembly mission. The primary payload was the Russian Rassvet Mini-Research Module along with an Integrated Cargo Carrier-Vertical Light Deployable (ICC-VLD). This was the final scheduled mission of Atlantis. Sellers took a four-inch wood sample of Sir Isaac Newton's apple tree, a piece from the original tree that supposedly inspired Newton's theory of gravity, along with a picture of Newton. The wood is part of the collection of the Royal Society archives in London, and was returned after the flight. He also took an original watercolor portrait of Cranbrook School painted by Brenda Barratt.

== Honours and awards ==
- 1994 NASA Exceptional Scientific Achievement Medal
- 1995 Arthur Fleming Award
- 1996 Fellow of the American Geophysical Union
- 1997 American Meteorological Society Houghton Award & Fellow of the American Meteorological Society

Sellers was appointed Officer of the Order of the British Empire (OBE) in the 2011 New Year Honours for services to science, and in June 2016 received the NASA Distinguished Service Medal.

In April 2017, James Ellis, the retired U.S. Navy admiral and chair of the Space Foundation's Board of Directors, honored Sellers posthumously with the General James E. Hill Lifetime Space Achievement Award.

In honor of Piers Sellers, the Priestley International Centre of Climate at the University of Leeds, awards the Piers Sellers Prizes for a 'World leading contribution to solution-focused climate research', and for 'exceptional PhD research'. Laureates include Joeri Roegelj (2016), Felix Creutzig (2017), Mark New (2018), Petra Tschakert (2019), and Katharine Mach (2020). In 2022, Joyeeta Gupta was awarded the main prize, with the PhD prize jointly awarded to Angus Naylor and Adele Dixon.
