= Mike Osborn =

British Army officer (1917–2010)

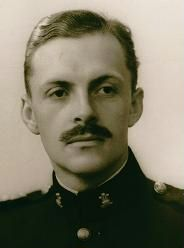
- Mike Osborn, in World War II
- Born: 28 July 1917; Kingston upon Thames, England, UK
- Died: 15 January 2010 (aged 92)
- Allegiance: United Kingdom
- Branch: British Army
- Rank: Colonel
- Service number: 73121
- Commands: 22nd Special Air Service Regiment [SAS], 1st Battalion, The Federation Regiment
- Awards: Distinguished Service Order; Officer of the Order of the British Empire; Military Cross

Colonel Michael Ashby Chadwick Osborn DSO, OBE, MC (28 July 1917 – 15 January 2010) was an officer in the British Army and a former commander of the 22nd Special Air Service Regiment. He played a leading part in the arrest of Heinrich Himmler, the D-Day invasion strategy, as well as the North and East African Campaigns.

== Early life ==
Osborn, was born in Kingston upon Thames to Majorie Crick and Captain George Ashby Chadwick Osborn of 7th Battalion of the Wiltshire Regiment. His father, was killed in 1917 during the Salonika Campaign of the First World War. Following the death of his father in his infancy, he was diagnosed with tuberculosis, and his family would move to Switzerland. Here he would attend Chillon College in Montreux, and they would stay there until 1929, after which they moved back to Kent in the United Kingdom, where he would be educated at Cranbrook School.

== Military career ==
Subsequent to his years in school, Osborn entered the Royal Military College, Sandhurst, from where he was commissioned into the West Yorkshire Regiment and was soon posted to the 1st Battalion in India.

=== Second World War ===
In 1940 and 1941, after a spell in Egypt and the Sudan, he would see action in Eritrea and Abyssinia as part of the East African Campaign. It is here that he commanded the 2nd West Yorkshire Regiment. He was awarded the MC in Keren for successfully capturing the Dologorodoc Fort, a former Italian stronghold. Weeks later, he would be awarded a DSO for repelling a heavy Italian offensive at Tobruk, where he sustained a bullet wound to the head.

After recovering from his wound, he was posted to Sicily where he would plan the strategic allied invasion. Here, his jeep would be hit by a shell killing his driver and wounding Osborn.

After recovering in London, he was posted to the War Office in 1943, it is here that he would plan the forthcoming D-Day invasion. Later in April 1944 he joined the staff of the 2nd British Army Headquarters, where he would serve under the command of Selwyn Lloyd. Later this year, he would land in Normandy with the 2nd British Army.

By 1945, the allied forces were rapidly advancing into Germany, under the command of General Sir Miles Dempsey he would be one of the first Allied military personnel to enter the concentration camp at Belsen.

By May 1945, Osborn had learned that an individual bearing a stark resemblance to SS leader Heinrich Himmler, had entered an allied interrogation camp, perhaps to surrender to the Allies or seek refuge. Upon being informed of this news Osborn, headed straight to the whereabouts of the suspected individual, identified him, and subsequently apprehended him accompanied by a Lieutenant-Colonel "Spud" Murphy. Osborn and Murphy, would take Himmler to Army HQ, where Himmler is believed to have committed suicide by the means of hiding a potassium cyanide capsule under his tongue and subsequently ingesting it before interrogation could begin.

He was then appointed second in command of the 1st Battalion West Yorkshire Regiment in Burma as part of the South-East Asian theatre. Following victory in the Far East he commanded the 2nd Battalion in Indonesia and Malaya.

=== Malayan Emergency ===
After serving at posts in Greece and Vienna, he would also play a significant role in the Malayan Emergency commanding the 1st Battalion, The Federation Regiment in operations across Malaya in 1958, aiding the British effort to prevent the rise of communism in the area. Come the end of his service in Malaya, he would be awarded the PJK Meritorious Service medal.

=== Later career ===
Several years later, in 1961 Osborn attended the Imperial Defence College, London, where he would become acquainted with King Hussain of Jordan and the Shah of Iran.

== Later life ==
After 27 years of service, Osborn was posted to Bielefeld in the British occupation zone. After the end of his post in Germany, Osborn retired to develop a villa rental business on the island of Skiathos in Greece with his wife Anita.

In 1978, Mike Osborn and his wife returned to the United Kingdom, where they settled in Shaftesbury, Dorset.

Mike Osborn died on 15 January 2010. He is survived by his daughter, Veronica. His son, Simon, died in late 2010, and his wife, Anita, died in April 2019.
