= LBi =

Dutch marketing and technology company

LBi International N.V.
- Company type: Public
- Traded as: LTS: 0N3L
- Industry: Digital marketing
- Headquarters: Amsterdam, Netherlands
- Key people: Luke Taylor, CEO; Ewen Sturgeon, COO; Fred Mulder, Chairman; Chris Clarke, CCO; Lyndsay Menzies, CMO; Lorenzo Wood, CTO
- Revenue: 250 Million USD
- Website: www.lbi.com

LBi International N.V. was a global marketing and technology agency, now merged with Digitas to form DigitasLBi.

Headquartered in Amsterdam (the Netherlands), LBi had 32 offices in 17 countries and a staff of approximately 2,000, who collaborate with brands on digital marketing services such as design, branded content, mobile, CRM and social media. In 2012, Publicis Groupe bought LBi for €416m in cash, and in 2013 merged the company with Digitas.

== History ==
Formed by the merger of LB Icon, Framfab and Wheel: in August 2006, then remodelled after the merger with bigmouthmedia in 2010. It was listed on Euronext in Amsterdam. From 2006 until the bigmouthmedia merger in 2010 LBi was a dual-listed company with shares also available on the OMX Nordic Exchange in Stockholm (symbol: LBI). LB is an acronym for Lost Boys, Icon was formerly named Icon Medialab, Framfab was Framtidsfabriken - the Future Factory.

One of the three current New York city offices became part of the LBi group of companies after merging with IconMedialab in the 1990s. This was previously Tom Nicholson Associates, a company started by Thomas J Nicholson in 1987. It was located in the historic Puck Building on the corner of Lafayette and Houston.

The Atlanta office was led by Joe Schab and became part of LBi upon the acquisition of Creative Digital Group in 2007. In 2011, Lisa Campbell Harper was named Managing Director and led the Atlanta division until the merger with Digitas in 2013.

In January 2008, LBi acquired specialist search optimisation company Netrank from UKRD_Group in a move to boost its search capabilities. Lucy Allen was retained as Managing Director, with Manley leading the new Exeter office through to the Publicis Groupe acquisition in 2012. LBi beat WPP Group and a second undisclosed bidder to buy the agency.

In April 2008, LBi bought social media agency Special Ops for $45m. Special Ops co-founders, Jason Klein and Christian Anthony, were both exited from LBi in a management restructure late in 2010.

On 1 August 2010, LBi was absorbed by Obtineo and the company delisted from the Swedish stock exchange. Obtineo was composed of digital agency bigmouthmedia and €50m of new investment from the Carlyle Group, Cyrte and Janivo. On the same date, Obtineo rebranded as LBi.

LBi acquired the New York-based Mr Youth in November 2011 in a deal worth $40m.

In November 2012, LBi announced the acquisition of ecommerce systems integrator Sceneric.

In September 2012, Publicis Groupe bought LBi for £333m in a cash deal, and later merged the company with Digitas to form DigitasLBi.

== Offices ==
The company had over 2,000 employees located primarily in the major European and American business centers: Amsterdam, Atlanta, Berlin, Brussels, Copenhagen, Cologne, Dubai, Edinburgh, Exeter, Ghent, Hamburg, London, Madrid, Milan, Mumbai, Munich, New York City, Malmö, Stockholm and Zurich. As of 2011, clients included: ABN Amro, BT, Barclays Capital, Canon, Confused, British Airways, Autoglass, Sony, Thomas Cook and Volvo.

== Personnel ==
In June 2012, Michael Islip replaced Phil Gripton as MD of LBi UK.

== Timeline ==
- 1995: Lost Boys and Icon Medialab are founded
- 2001: Lost Boys and Icon Medialab combine to form LB Icon
- 2004: Winsome Benelux, Wheel and Aspect are acquired by LB Icon
- 2005: Framfab and Oyster partner
- 2006: The new agency formed by Framfab and Oyster is acquired by the agency now known as LBi
- 2007: LBi acquires Syrup and Iven & Hillmann
- 2008: LBi acquires Special Opps and Netrank
- 2010: Bigmouthmedia merges with LBi to form the world’s largest independent marketing and technology agency
- 2011: LBi announces the acquisition of New York-based social media agency Mr Youth (later rebranded as MRY)
- 2012: LBi acquires Sceneric
- 2012: LBi bought by Publicis Groupe
