= John Bluett (cricketer) =

English cricketer (1930–2019)

Personal information
- Full name: John Douglas Jeremy Bluett
- Born: 29 May 1930; Kensington, London
- Died: 23 August 2019 (aged 89); Orpington, Kent
- Batting: Right-handed
- Bowling: Right-arm off break

Domestic team information
- Years: Team
- 1950: Kent

Career statistics
Competition	First-class
Matches	2
Runs scored	16
Batting average	8.00
100s/50s	0/0
Top score	10
Catches/stumpings	1/–
- Source: CricInfo, 7 August 2020

John Douglas Jeremy Bluett (29 May 1930 – 23 August 2019) was an English amateur cricketer who played two first-class cricket matches for Kent County Cricket Club in 1950.

Bluett was born at Kensington in London, and was educated at Cranbrook School, Kent, captaining the side in his final year when he averaged almost 60 runs per innings. Wisden described his batting during 1948 as "splendid" and "consistent" and he played for Southern Schools at Lord's in 1948, was twelfth man for the Public Schools against a Services side, and made his Second XI debut for Kent the same year. During his National Service serving in the Royal Artillery between 1948 and 1950, Bluett played 10 times for the Second XI in the Minor Counties Championship.

Good batting performances featuring centuries against Sussex Second XI and Devon in 1950 saw him called into the First XI and he made his senior debut against Worcestershire in the 1950 County Championship at Tunbridge Wells. He played again in Kent's following match against Leicestershire at Loughborough, but scored only ten runs in the two innings in which he batted and played no more first-class cricket.

In local cricket, Bluett played for Bromley Cricket Club and was capped by the Club Cricket Conference in 1954, playing nine times for the CCC side, including against the touring Indian side in 1959. He made five more Second XI appearances for Kent, the last in 1958, and played for a variety of amateur sides, including the Forty Club, Yellowhammers, Incogniti and Band of Brothers. He also played field hockey for Bromley Cricket Club.

Bluett worked on the London Stock Exchange and was the director of a timber broking company. He served on the Kent General Committee between 1977 and 1979, and ran the junior section of Band of Brothers for a time. Two of his sons played cricket for Bromley. He died in August 2019 at the Princess Royal University Hospital in Orpington aged 89.
