= EnergyNet =

Decentralized electricity-distribution architecture

- Year started: 2023-02-08
- Organization: ViaEuropa
- Committee: EnergyNet Task Force
- Authors: Jonas Birgersson, Marc A. Weiss, Jimmy Chen, Daniel Kammen, Tomas Kåberger, Franklin Carrero-Martínez, Joakim Wernberg, Michael Menser, Newsha K. Ajami
- Domain: Electric power distribution
- Website: https://www.energynettaskforce.org/

EnergyNet is a decentralized electricity-distribution architecture developed by the EnergyNet Task Force, founded in 2023 by Swedish entrepreneur Jonas Birgersson of ViaEuropa. It combines local electricity generation and storage with software-controlled power electronics and interconnected local networks, using an architecture inspired by the Internet.

A pilot in Lund entered operation in 2025, followed by a larger installation involving 278 apartments that was under construction in 2026.

== Development ==
Birgersson presented the underlying concept publicly in 2022, proposing interconnected local electricity networks in which electricity could be generated, stored and exchanged between properties.

The EnergyNet Task Force was founded on February 8th, 2023.

A pilot was under construction at Brunnshög in Lund by 2024 and entered operation in 2025. The project connected properties with local solar power and battery storage, allowing electricity to be shared locally while remaining connected to the conventional grid.

A larger deployment involving ten residential buildings and 278 apartments in the Pottugnen area of Lund was under construction in 2026.

== Architecture ==
EnergyNet is a network of interconnected local electrical systems. Its basic unit is the Energy Local Area Network (ELAN), corresponding to a building or local microgrid. Multiple ELANs can be connected into an Energy Wide Area Network (EWAN).

Energy flows are controlled by devices termed Energy Routers. These use power electronics and an internal direct current backplane to connect local loads, generation and storage, other Energy Routers, and the conventional electricity grid.

Communication between Energy Routers uses the open Energy Protocol (EP). The architecture also includes an Energy Router Operating System (EROS), an EP Server and an Energy Network Management System (ENMS) for managing multiple routers.

The Energy Routers provide galvanic separation between local systems and the conventional grid, allowing electricity transfers to be controlled electronically rather than directly coupling the networks.
