= Newsha Ajami =

American hydrologist

Newsha K. Ajami
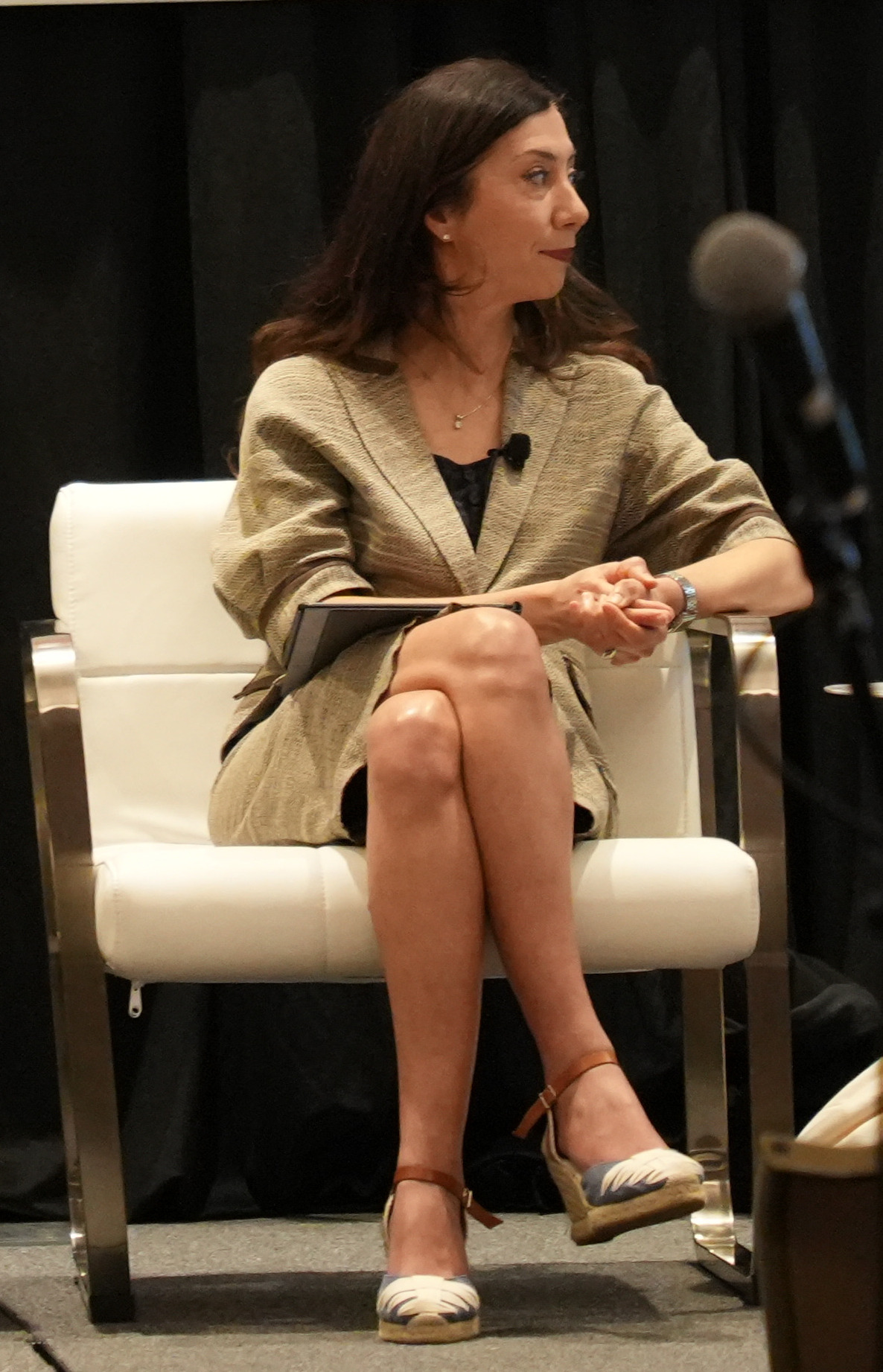
- Ajami in 2025
- Born: Tehran, Iran
- Citizenship: American, Iranian
- Education: Amirkabir University of Technology (BS); University of Arizona (MS); University of California, Irvine (PhD)
- Occupation: Chief Strategic Development Officer for Research Lawrence Berkeley National Laboratory
- Notable work: IBUNE (An Integrated Bayesian Uncertainty Estimator for Hydrologic Prediction) Machine Learning and Data Analytics for Demand Forecasting and Infrastructure Planning Media-Water Demand Nexus Wildfire-Water Nexus
- Awards: AGU Fellow (2024); AGU Ambassador Award (2024)

Newsha Khodatalab Ajami is an Iranian-American hydrologist, civil engineer, and environmental policy expert. She is recognized for her work in sustainable urban water management, water-energy-food nexus analytics, and the application of data science to environmental governance and climate resilience. She serves as the Founding Director of Governance for Risk, Resilience, and Recovery (GR3) Program at the Stanford Doerr School of Sustainability.

Ajami previously served as Chief Strategic Development Officer for the Earth and Environmental Sciences Area at Lawrence Berkeley National Laboratory and as Director of Urban Water Policy at Stanford University's Water in the West program.

== Early life and education ==
Ajami was born and raised in Tehran, Iran. From a young age she was fascinated by math and problem solving games, and spent much of her time playing with Legos. Ajami credits her inspiration to become an engineer to her maternal grandfather who was a railroads engineer in Iran. Ajami later went on to earn her B.S. in Civil Engineering from Tehran Polytechnic. During her time as an undergraduate she had the opportunity to intern with a consulting company that helped develop decision support tools to aid in dam operation and reservoir management in Iran. This opportunity sparked Ajami's interest in the environmental and social implications of water, and decision making process. After entering the field of hydrological sciences, Ajami continued her studies in the United States at the University of Arizona, where she received her M.S. in hydrology and water resources. She further continued her education at the University of California, Irvine where she earned her Ph.D. in civil and environmental engineering.

== Career and research ==
Ajami is an engineer and hydrologist by training but much of her current research is interdisciplinary in nature. Her work focuses on applying mathematical models of societal implications to better understand water consumption and demand in arid and semiarid regions, especially in the Western United States. Ajami currently works at Stanford University as the director of urban water policy for water in the west and focuses much of her current work on ways to improve water related outcomes for scientists, stakeholders, and policy makers. Though she is a trained scientist, her work focuses on creating financial and social incentives to mitigate water use and practices for the future of California residents. She applies her hydrologic mathematical models that explain the natural and physical processes of water to climate change, in order to better predict and forecast the future of water disturbances. In the context of recent droughts in California, Ajami sees them as an opportunity to refine policies and redefine water management practices. She believes that California has the potential to emerge as a work leader in water similar to the progress made within the energy sector. Some of her most recent research explored the ways in which social media impacts perception and memory of drought and how it influences individual water use practices. Needless to say, her research is groundbreaking in its implications and practical uses for the future development of water usage in California.

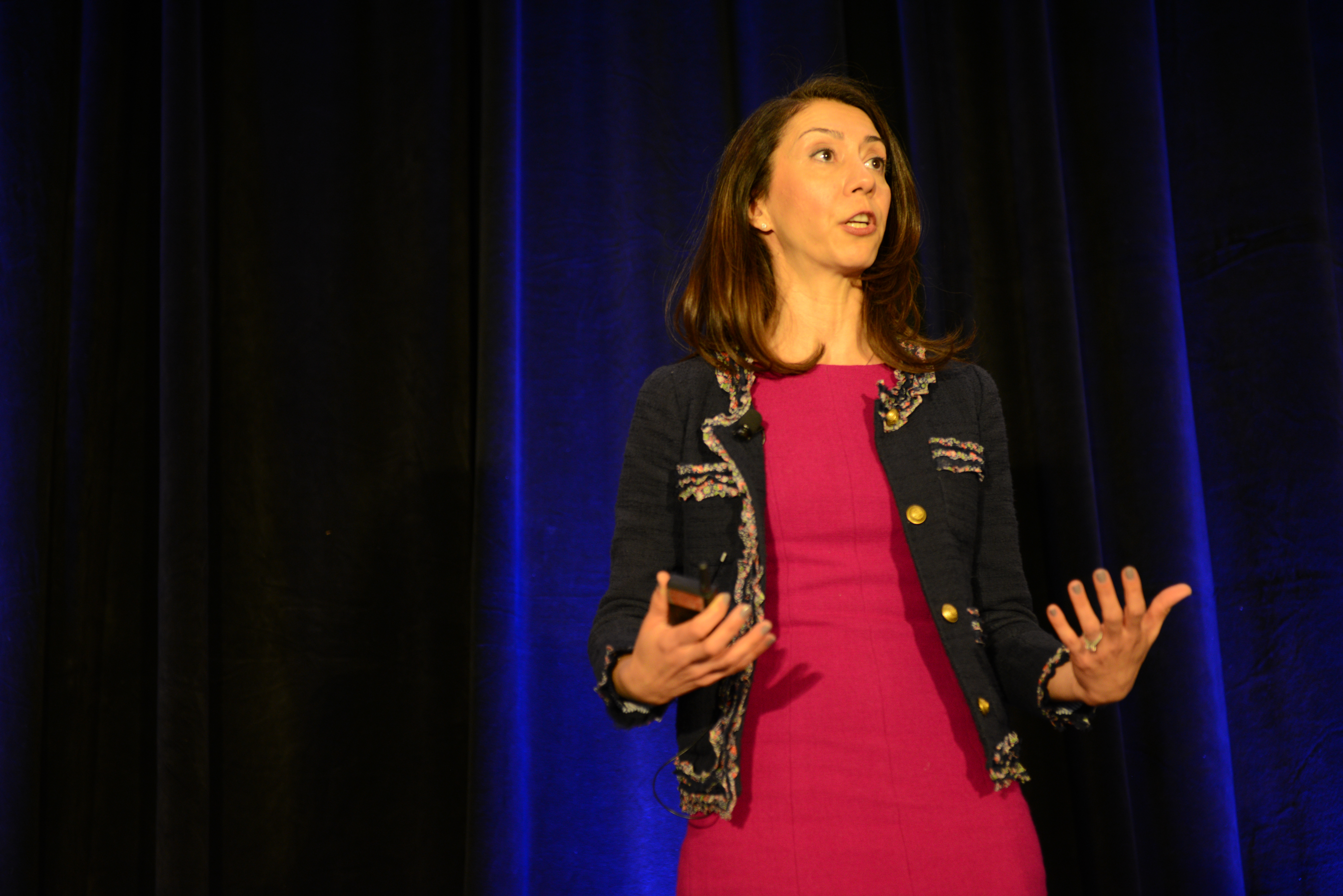
Ajami in 2020

In 2025, Ajami co-authored EnergyNet Explained: Internetification of Energy Distribution, a preprint describing EnergyNet, a decentralized electricity distribution architecture inspired by internet networking principles.

== Awards and recognition ==
Through her career, Ajami has received many significant awards, including:

- Fellow, American Geophysical Union (2024)
- Ambassador Award, American Geophysical Union (2024)
- Inaugural Class, University of California, Irvine Engineering Hall of Fame (2015)
- Water Leader, Water Education Foundation (2011)

From 2010 to 2011, Ajami was selected as a California Council on Science and Technology science policy fellow. During this fellowship, she served as a scientific consultant and policy advisor directly to the California Senate Natural Resources and Water Committee, bridging technical climate and hydrological research with state legislative processes. For Ajami, the fellowship opportunity provided her with a transition into politics and the legal system in relation to environmental issues.

== Public service and advisory roles ==
Ajami has been appointed to high-level regional public utility and water governance boards in California:

- San Francisco Public Utilities Commission: Appointed by the Mayor of San Francisco, she served as a commissioner and president from 2021 to 2024, focusing on equity, water affordability, and climate adaptation.
- San Francisco Bay Regional Water Quality Control Board: Served two terms as a gubernatorial appointee (2013–2021), during which she championed the integration of green infrastructure into regional stormwater policies.
- National Academies: She has been a standing member of the Board on Water Science and Technology at the National Academies of Sciences, Engineering, and Medicine since 2018.

== Personal life ==
Ajami resides in San Francisco with her husband and two children. Ajami served as a mayoral appointee to San Francisco Public Utilities Commission from 2021 to 2024 and was a gubernatorial appointee to the San Francisco Bay Regional Water Quality Control Board from 2013-2021.
