= Joseph Janus =

American advertising executive and businessman

Joseph Janus is an American advertising executive and businessman. He is the chief executive officer and chief marketing officer of WESC (We Are the Superlative Conspiracy), a clothing company. He has been the advertising and marketing senior vice president at Calvin Klein and the Creative Director of Bodhi Bags.

== Career ==
Janus began his career at Guess, and then in the 1990s worked for JNCO. Janus worked with "an in-house group of illustrators, clothing designers, graffiti artists and promotion experts that serve as an ad hoc ad team to ensure the look and feel of advertising will be anything but traditional." For his work at JNCO, Advertising Age named him as one of the "Marketing 100". After leaving JNCO, he began working for Calvin Klein.

While working at Bodhi Bags, Janus expanded the brand to include items for men and tech collections. Bodhi also partnered with North Shore Animal League and Beth Ostrosky to create a limited edition line of animal friendly bags.

== Personal life ==
Janus is a songwriter and CEO of Fearless Management and Productions, which is home to such musicians as Ben Jelen.
