= Edwin Shirley =

English rock & roll tour organiser, film studio manager, & impresario (1948-2013)

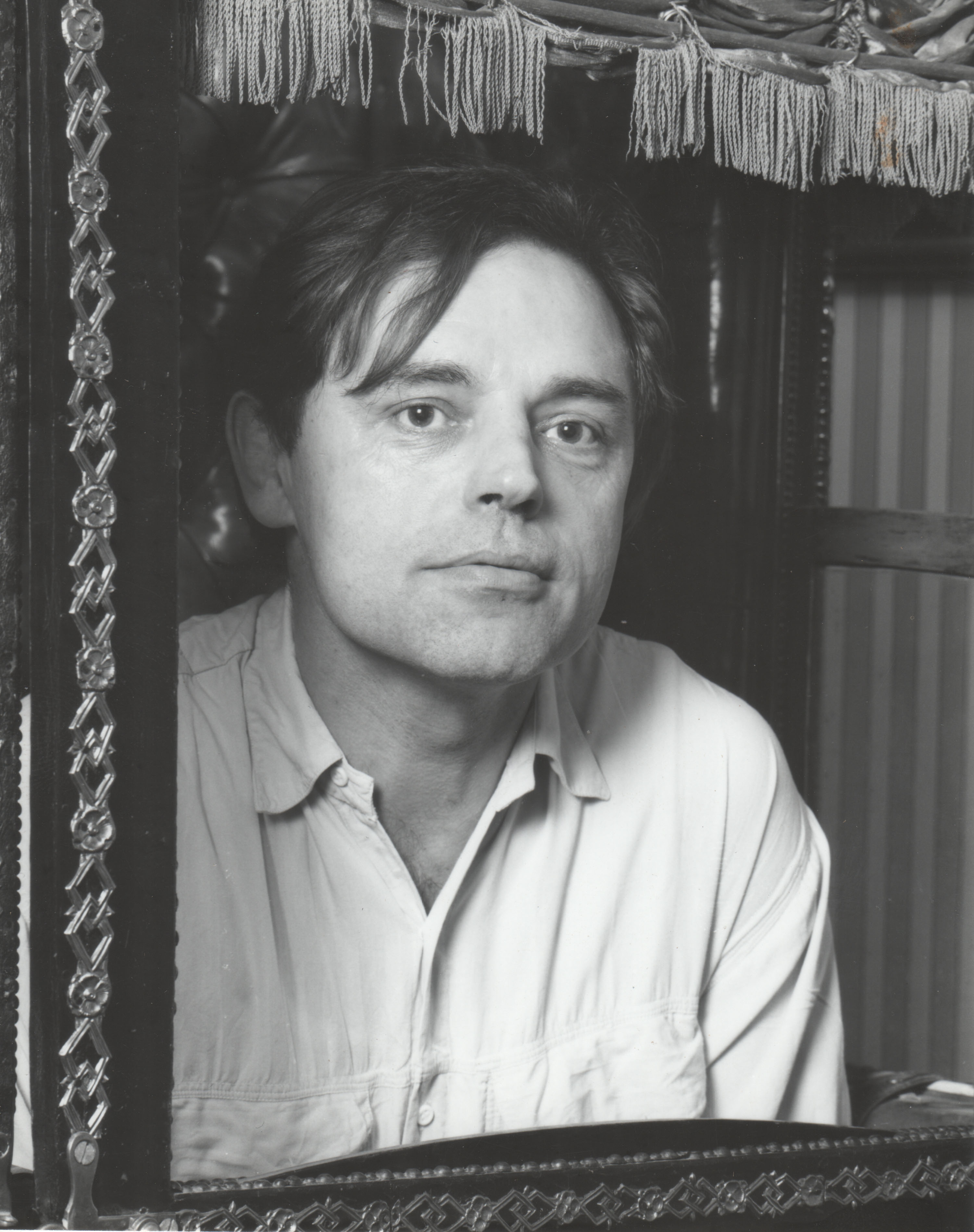
- Shirley in the 1980s
- Born: 16 October 1948; Cranbrook, Kent, England
- Died: 16 April 2013 (aged 64); Hackney, London, England
- Education: BA in Modern Languages (University of Cambridge)
- Occupations: Entrepreneur, Film Studio Manager
- Employer: Edwin Shirley Trucking
- Known for: Edwin Shirley Trucking, impresario, Three Mills Island Studios

Edwin Shirley (16 October 1948 – 16 April 2013), was a British rock concert tour organiser, film studio manager, and impresario. He co-founded Edwin Shirley Trucking (later abbreviated to EST) in 1974, which became one of the largest music transport companies in Europe. He went on to convert old bonded warehouses in the east end of London into the successful film and television recording studio, Three Mills Island Studios. In his later life he returned to the transport business, particularly for theatre companies and other parts of the entertainment industry.

== Early life ==
Edwin Antoine Shirley was born in Cranbrook, Kent on 16 October 1948 to Herbert Shirley and Marie Gates. He was educated at Cranbrook School, and then St Catharine's College, Cambridge, where he took a BA in Modern Languages (specialising in French and German). He was involved in numerous undergraduate stage productions as an actor and director. He also acted in a number of plays with the National Youth Theatre.

== Edwin Shirley Trucking ==
Shirley's language skills and knowledge of theatre lighting and sound led him into jobs on tour with the Rolling Stones and other prominent bands of the 1970s. After working on numerous Rock and Roll tours, he established Edwin Shirley Trucking with Roy Lamb. The company was run from his family farm in Kent, and later expanded into premises in East London.

Edwin Shirley Trucking became indelibly associated with live music tours. In an obituary on Planet Rock Radio, Bernard Doherty referred to the apocryphal notion that "You haven't really made it until Edwin Shirley is moving your gear around". Brian May of Queen, noted Shirley's importance to their touring operation: "Edwin was at the head of Queen's vehicle convoy for so many years I can't begin to remember how many... He was a great pal of Gerry Stickells, our illustrious Tour Manager and the two of them wrote the book on how to party on tour."

=== Edwin Shirley Staging ===
Having built a successful trucking company, Shirley started a new company Edwin Shirley Staging which built stages for a number of large concerts including Live Aid in 1985. Shirley left both companies in the 1990s.

== Three Mills Island Studios ==
While looking for rehearsal space in East London, Shirley viewed Three Mills Island, and realised the potential to develop a film studio there. After meeting with Peter Bazalgette, Shirley secured the site as the location for the first Big Brother reality TV programme, which went on to become a major domestic television series. The studio proved a success, but a dispute with the landlord led to the site being taken over by another company. As of 2013, the studio is still operating.

== Death ==
Having suffered from bowel cancer since 2009, Shirley had undergone effective surgery and carried on working for four years. On 14 April 2013 Shirley was hospitalised due to a massive bleed, and after two days in Homerton Hospital, Hackney, died on 16 April 2013.
