= Bredbandsbolaget =

Swedish Internet service provider

- Industry: Internet service provider
- Founded: 1998
- Defunct: May 15, 2018
- Fate: Merged into Telenor Sverige
- Headquarters: Sweden
- Area served: Sweden
- Services: Internet, television, telephony
- Parent: Telenor
- Website: www.bredbandsbolaget.se

Bredbandsbolaget (The Broadband Company, later B2 Bredband) was a Swedish broadband Internet service provider (ISP) founded in 1998 by Jonas Birgersson with a focus on high-speed Internet connection for homes and businesses using optical fiber.

In 1999, Peter Ekelund was named Chief Executive Officer and Bredbandsbolaget entered into a strategic agreement with Cisco Systems valued at $200 million for the construction of a broadband network in Sweden. The company also filed a complaint with the European Commission against incumbent telecom operator Telia concerning predatory pricing.

In 2003, Bredbandsbolaget was the second largest ISP in Sweden. It was acquired by Norwegian telecom company Telenor in 2005, and on 15 May 2018 it merged into its parent company Telenor Sverige.
