= ViaEuropa =

Swedish telecommunications and energy infrastructure company

- Industry: Telecommunications; energy infrastructure
- Founded: 1999
- Founder: Jonas Birgersson
- Headquarters: Lund, Sweden
- Website: www.viaeuropa.net

ViaEuropa (Via Europa) is a Swedish technology company founded by Jonas Birgersson in 1999 and based in Lund. The company runs as a communications operator in open-access fiber networks and, since the 2020s, has expanded into systems for local electricity distribution and sharing.

== History ==
=== Telecommunications ===
Jonas Birgersson presenting ViaEuropa at LeWeb in Paris in 2008

By 2002, ViaEuropa operated an open-access fiber network in Stockholm, with around 2,000 buildings connected. At the time, it planned to offer services to about 9,000 apartments and 15,000 offices.

ViaEuropa began expanding internationally in the early 2010s, securing contracts in Switzerland in 2010, in Costa Rica in 2012, and in Germany in 2016.

In 2012–2013, it led the consortium selected to build a new fiber network using infrastructure belonging to the Israel Electric Corporation. The project was planned to comprise about 25,000 kilometres of fiber and reach around two-thirds of Israel.

=== Energy systems ===
In the early 2020s, Jonas Birgersson began presenting plans for a decentralized electricity system inspired by the architecture of the Internet.

In March 2024, ViaEuropa entered a partnership with Sveriges Allmännytta, a Swedish public housing industry association, concerning local energy systems for housing companies, including local generation, storage and sharing of electricity. Later that year, ViaEuropa and Lund-based Elonroad established the joint development company Open Energy Lab to develop control systems for local electricity networks.

In 2025, ViaEuropa installed a pilot project in the Brunnshög district of Lund in which two adjacent buildings were connected through a local direct current network incorporating solar panels, battery storage and an open communication protocol for controlling energy flows. The architecture is known as EnergyNet. By September 2026, a related system was being installed in a public-housing complex in Lund comprising ten buildings and 278 apartments.
