= Katie Kittermaster =

English singer-songwriter

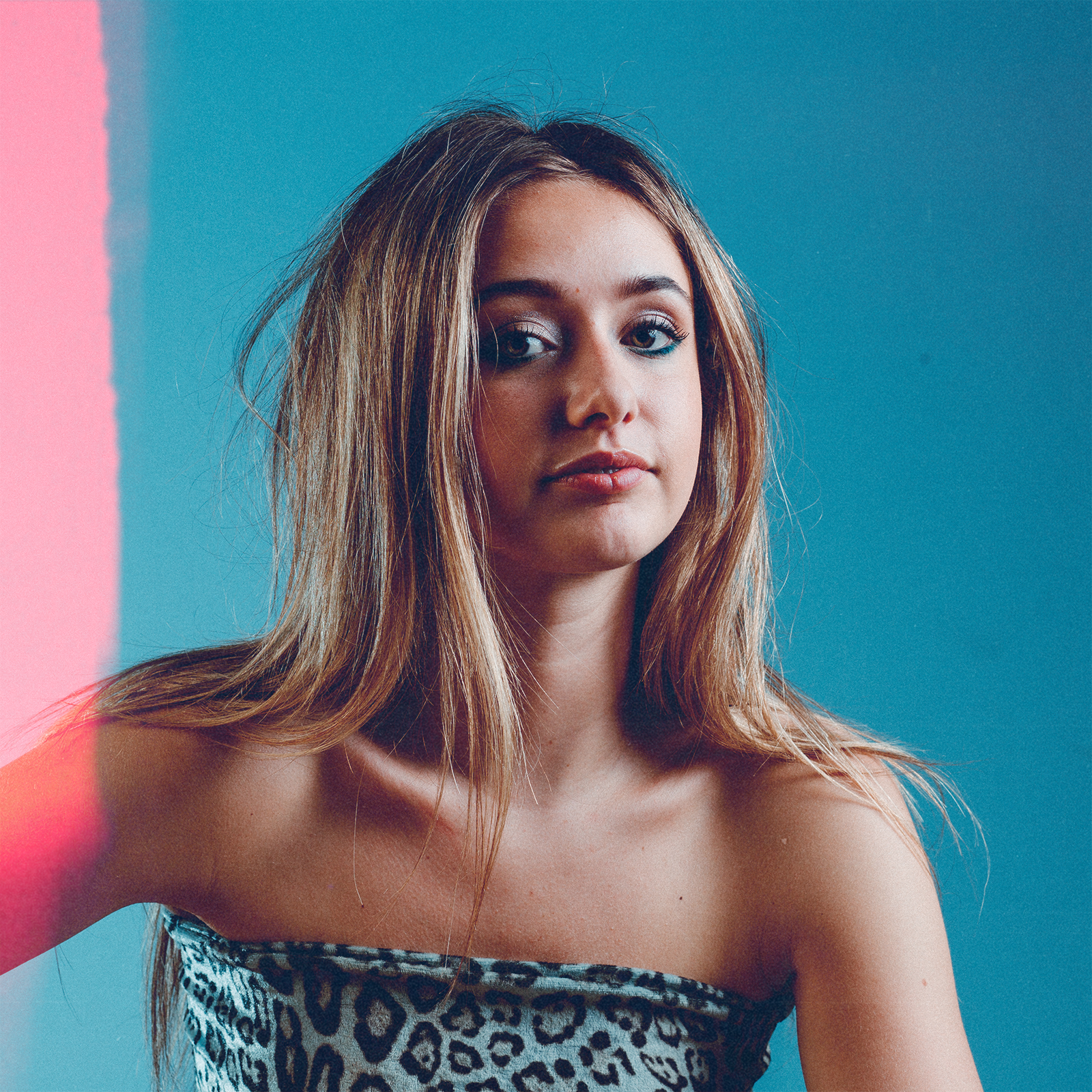
- Katie Kittermaster in March 2019
- Born: 26 September 2000 (age 26); Sutton Valence, Kent, England
- Occupations: Singer; songwriter; Tiktoker
- Years active: 2012–present
- Musical career
- Genre: Pop
- Instruments: Vocals, guitar, keyboard
- Label: Revanche Records

Katie Kittermaster (born 26 September 2000) is a British singer-songwriter.

== Biography ==
Kittermaster was born and raised in Sutton Valence, Kent, England. At the age of eleven, she moved to Dubai, where she performed at an event organised by the Global Gift Foundation.

When she was thirteen, she relocated to the United Kingdom where she continued her career in music, and at the age of sixteen performed with The X Factor UK winner Louisa Johnson at The Big Day Out to an audience of fourteen thousand.

BBC News made a short news article about Kittermaster balancing school work and her musical career in 2018. She performed live on BBC Radio Kent during 2018. In 2018, she won the under 18 category in the UK Songwriting Contest.

In September 2019 she supported Boyzone's frontman Ronan Keating at Castle Howard and Kimbolton Castle. Kittermaster's music has been credited with helping to destigmatize mental health issues by encouraging conversations about it.

== Discography ==
=== EP ===
- "Coming Home" (October 2019)

=== Singles ===
- "Can You Hear Me" (2017)
- "Kaleidoscope" (2017)
- "T-Shirt" (2018)
- "Sunday Afternoon" (2019)
- "Disaster"
- "You Needed Me"
