= Jonas Birgersson =

Swedish internet entrepreneur

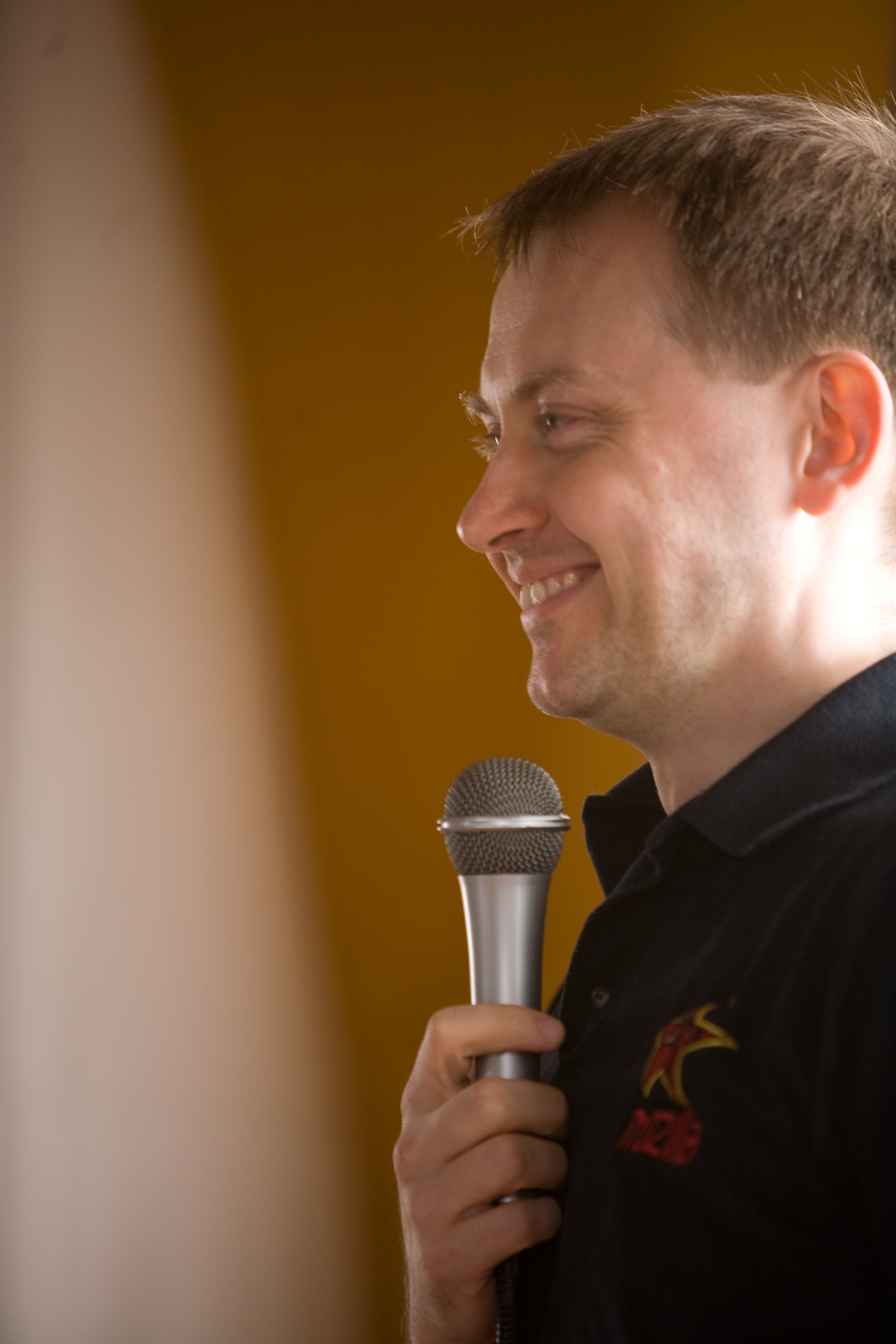
- Jonas Birgersson on stage in 2008
- Born: Carl Jonas Birgersson; November 21, 1971 (age 54)
- Occupation: Entrepreneur
- Known for: Framfab, Bredbandsbolaget, ViaEuropa, EnergyNet
- Awards: Global Leaders for Tomorrow (2000, World Economic Forum)

Jonas Birgersson (born 21 November 1971) is a Swedish entrepreneur best known for co-founding the internet consultancy Framfab, broadband operator Bredbandsbolaget, and open-access network operator ViaEuropa. He became a prominent figure in Sweden's technology sector during the dot-com boom.

== Career ==
Birgersson founded Framtidsfabriken with associates, later renamed Framfab, in 1995 and served as its chief executive. The company expanded rapidly in the late 1990s. In July 2000, Framfab employed about 1,700 people in eight countries and had a market capitalization of $1.7 billion.

Birgersson was also one of the founders of Bredbandsbolaget, established to provide high-speed broadband connections. Bredbandsbolaget planned to build a fiber-based network offering internet, telephone and video services in competition with the incumbent telecommunications company Telia.

In 2000, Birgersson was selected by the World Economic Forum as one of its Global Leaders for Tomorrow.

Following the collapse of technology stocks in 2000, Framfab's share price fell sharply. Birgersson left his management positions at both Framfab and Bredbandsbolaget.

He subsequently founded and led the broadband software company Labs2 and open access operator ViaEuropa and continued to advocate for widespread fiber broadband deployment.

In the 2020s, Birgersson had turned his attention to electricity distribution, developing through ViaEuropa the EnergyNet concept, which applies principles of internet architecture to interconnected local electricity networks, and has entered an agreement with Sveriges Allmännytta to develop local energy-sharing systems among its member housing companies.
