= Framfab =

Swedish internet consultancy

- Formerly: Framtidsfabriken
- Industry: Internet consulting
- Founded: 1995
- Founder: Jonas Birgersson
- Defunct: 2006
- Fate: Merger with LB Icon
- Successor: LBi
- Headquarters: Lund, Sweden

Framfab, originally Framtidsfabriken (literally "the Future Factory"), was a Swedish internet consultancy founded in 1995 by Jonas Birgersson and associates. Framfab expanded rapidly during the dot-com boom and became for a time Europe's largest internet consultancy, valued at approximately SEK 42 billion at its peak.

== History ==
Framfab provided strategic and internet consulting services. By July 2000, the company employed 1,700 people in eight countries and had a market capitalization of $1.7 billion. Its clients included Volvo, Kellogg's, Commerzbank, Bosch, IKEA and Nike.

The company was listed on the Stockholm Stock Exchange in 1999 and expanded through acquisitions during the internet boom. At its peak, Framfab had around 3,000 employees and was valued at approximately SEK 42 billion.

Following the collapse of the dot-com market, Framfab's share price fell sharply and the company reduced its workforce and operations. Birgersson left the position of chief executive in November 2000.

In 2006, Framfab and the digital agency LB Icon agreed to merge. The combined company had approximately 1,200 employees in ten countries and annualized revenue exceeding SEK 1.5 billion. The merger was completed in July 2006, with LB Icon absorbed into Framfab and the combined company renamed LBi International.
