= Daniel Kammen =

American scientist

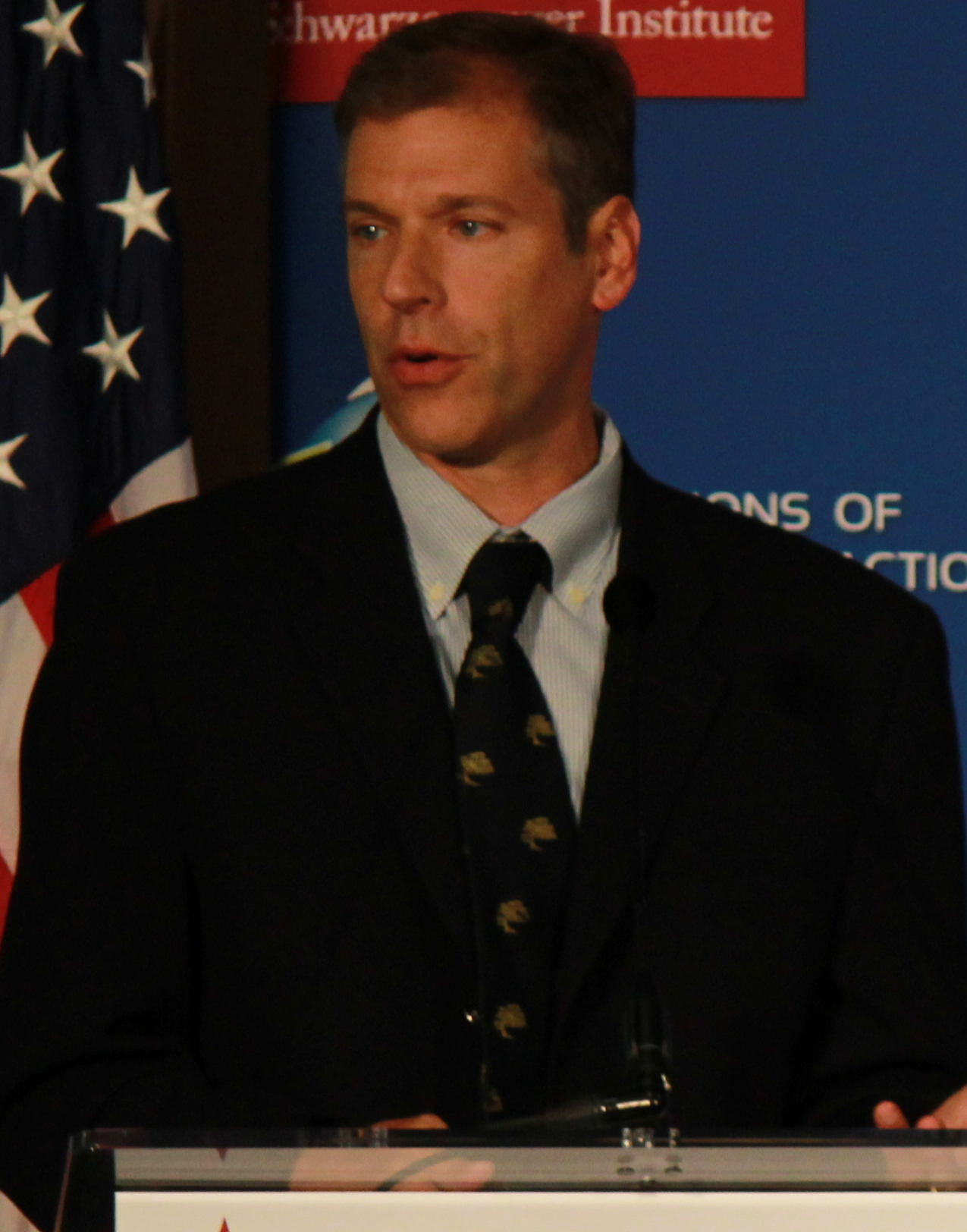
- Born: Daniel Merson Kammen
- Education: Cornell University (BA); Harvard University (MA, PhD)
- Scientific career
- Workplaces: University of California, Berkeley
- Website: Official website

Daniel Merson Kammen (born 1962) is an American scientist, renewable energy expert, and former government figure. Since July 1, 2025, he has been a Bloomberg Distinguished Professor at the Johns Hopkins University . Before joining Hopkins, he fully retired from the University of California, Berkeley where he was the Distinguished Professor of Energy in the Energy and Resources Group .

Kammen is noted as a coordinating lead author for the Intergovernmental Panel on Climate Change, which won the 2007 Nobel Peace Prize for their report, Climate Change 2007, assessing man-made global warming. In 1998, Kammen was elected a permanent fellow of the African Academy of Sciences, and in 2007 received the Distinguished Citizen Award from the Commonwealth Club of California. Kammen was elected a member of the National Academy of Sciences in 2025.

== Early life and education ==
Originally from Ithaca, New York, Kammen is the son of Pulitzer Prize-winning historian and Cornell University professor Michael Kammen. He received his bachelor's degree in physics from Cornell University (1984) and his master's degree (1986) and PhD (1988) in physics from Harvard University. As a postdoctoral researcher at Caltech, Kammen began to transition to energy research, with a focus on the role of energy in developing economies.

== Career in government ==
On September 15, 2007, Kammen was appointed chief technical specialist for renewable energy and energy efficiency at the World Bank.

In 2016, he was selected as a U.S. Science Envoy by the United States State Department. He resigned from this position in 2017, citing what he believed to be President Trump's failure to denounce white supremacists and neo-Nazis. His August 23, 2017, resignation letter went viral, as netizens noticed that the first letter of each paragraph spelled out I-M-P-E-A-C-H.

Kammen has been mentioned as a potential Secretary of Energy in a Joe Biden administration.

In 2025, Kammen co-authored EnergyNet Explained: Internetification of Energy Distribution, a preprint describing EnergyNet, a decentralized electricity distribution architecture inspired by internet networking principles.

== See also ==
- Al Gore
- Amory Lovins
- Benjamin K. Sovacool
- Hermann Scheer
- John A. "Skip" Laitner
- Lee Schipper
- Mark Z. Jacobson
- Renewable energy commercialization
- Tom Steyer
