= Kunming University of Science and Technology =

University in Yunnan, China

- 昆明理工大学 (Chinese)
- Motto: 明德任责、致知力行
- Type: public university
- Established: 1954; 72 years ago
- Affiliations: Greater Mekong Sub-region Academic and Research Network (GMSARN)
- President: Zhou Rong
- Faculty: 4,224
- Undergraduates: 32,423 (2025)
- Postgraduates: 20,331 (2025)
- Location: Kunming, Yunnan, China
- Campus: Lianhua, Xinying and Chenggong
- Website: www.kmust.edu.cn

Chinese name
- Simplified Chinese: 昆明理工大学
- Traditional Chinese: 昆明理工大學
Transcriptions
Standard Mandarin
- Hanyu Pinyin: Kūnmíng Lǐgōng Dàxué

Kunming University of Science and Technology (KUST) (昆明理工大学) is in Kunming, the capital city of Yunnan Province, Southwestern China.

As the goal by 2010, KUST was to become a key university with a strong science and engineering background. The university is to be developed into an important provincial training base for advanced technical personnel, a research base for applied fundamental research and a hi-tech research, an industrialization base for hi-tech, and a research consulting center for the national social and economic development.

Yunnan University Science Park (YNUSP) was established as an experimental site of University Science Park in 1999 and was awarded the status of national university science park in May 2001. The park is supported by Yunnan University, Kunming University of Science & Technology, and Yunnan Normal University.

== Brief Introduction ==
Officially founded in 1954 and with the history started from 1925, Kunming University of Science and Technology (KUST) is one of the top 100 universities in China, and the largest university as well as the only polytechnic university across Yunnan province. Chinese Communist Party general secretary Xi Jinping praised KUST "a famous university in China" in early 2015 during an inspection tour of Yunnan province. KUST has 3 campuses, all located in Kunming, the capital of Southwest China's Yunnan province.

With 30 faculties (schools/colleges) and 3,900 staff members, KUST is offering over 300-degree programs at Bachelor, Master, and Doctor levels to around 40,000 full-time on-campus students. The programs cover engineering, science, management, economics, medicine, law, arts, philosophy, agriculture, and education.

== History ==
Early in 1925, the beginning departments of KUST started admitting undergraduate students for bachelor degrees. In September 1954, KUST, formerly called KIT (Kunming Institute of Technology) became an independent public higher education institution. In 1999, the former KIT and former Yunnan Polytechnic University amalgamated into the current KUST.

== Academics ==
=== Accreditation and memberships ===
KUST is a member of SAP University Alliances.

=== Programs ===
With the current 29 faculties (schools) covering the fields ranging from science, engineering and economics to administration, arts, law and education, KUST offers a complete list of degree programs including Ph.D., MS., MSEng., MEng, MA, BS, BSEng and BA, as well as programs including post-doctorate, preparatory, continuing education, vocational training and Chinese language training for international students.

=== Faculties ===
Graduate School

Division of Life and Medical Sciences Faculty of Life Science and Technology

      Center for Pharmaceutical Sciences and Engineering
      Center for Biotechnology and Bioengineering

Medical School

      Department of Clinical Medicine
      Department of Basic Medicine

Faculty of Agriculture and Food

     Department of Agricultural Mechanization
     Department of Agricultural Electrification
     Department of Agricultural Hydraulic Engineering
     Department of Food Science & Engineering
     Department of Food Quality & Safety
     Institute of Primate Translational Medicine

Faculty of Metallurgical and Energy Engineering

     Department of Metallurgical Engineering
     Department of New Energy Science and Engineering
     Department of Energy and Power Engineering

Faculty of Materials Science and Engineering

     Department of Materials Physics and Chemistry
     Department of Metallic Material Science
     Department of Inorganic & Non-metallic Material Science
     Department of Material Process Engineering
     Department of Gemmology and Materials Technology
     Materials Experiment and Testing Center

Faculty of Environmental Science and Engineering

     Department of Environmental Engineering
     Department of Environmental Science
     Department of Renewable Resource Science and Technology

Faculty of Land Resources Engineering

     Department of Geosciences
     Department of Land Information and Mapping Engineering
     Department of Resource Exploration Engineering
     Department of Mineral Process Engineering

Faculty of Mechanical and Electrical Engineering

     Department of Mechanical Engineering
     Department of Industrial Engineering
     Department of Packaging Engineering

Faculty of Information Engineering and Automation

     Department of Computer Science
     Department of Automation
     Department of Telecommunication Engineering
     Department of Biomedical Engineering

Faculty of Electric Power Engineering

     Department of Electrical Engineering
     Department of Hydraulic Engineering

Faculty of Civil Engineering and Mechanics

     Department of Civil Engineering
     Department of Engineering Mechanics
     Department of Municipal Engineering
     Department of Construction Management
     Institute of Building Environment and Energy Engineering

Faculty of Architecture and City Planning

     Department of Architecture
     Department of Urban and Rural Planning
     Department of Landscape Architecture

Faculty of Chemical Engineering

     Department of Chemical Engineering
     Department of Process Equipment and Control Engineering
     Department of Biomass Engineering

Faculty of Transportation Engineering

     Department of Traffic Engineering
     Department of Traffic and Transportation
     Department of Logistics Engineering
     Department of Vehicle Engineering

Faculty of Civil Aviation and Aeronautics

Faculty of Public Security and Emergency Management

     Department of Safety Engineering

Faculty of Management and Economics

     Department of Business Administration
     Department of Accounting
     Department of Applied Economics
     Department of Finance
     Department of Marketing
     Department of Management Science and Information System

Law School

    Center of Criminal Law
    Center of Constitution and Administrative Law
    Center of Environmental and Natural Resources Law
    Center of Civil and Commercial Law
    Center of Economic Law
    Center of Laws of Southeast Asia and International Law
    Center of Theories of Jurisprudence
    Yunnan Provincial Institute for Local Legislation
    Yunnan Provincial Institute of Intellectual Property Development

Faculty of Science

     Department of System Science and Applied Mathematics
     Department of Electronic Science and Applied Physics
     Department of Applied Chemistry

Faculty of Art and Communication

    Department of Environmental Design
    Department of Industrial Design
    Department of Journalism and Mass Communication
    Department of Visual Communication
    Department of Fine Arts

School of Marxism

    Teaching & Research Centre of Fundamental Principles of Marxism
    Teaching & Research Centre of Sinicized Marxism
    Teaching & Research Centre of Ideological and Political Education
    Teaching & Research Centre of Development of Modern Chinese Society
    Research Centre of Philosophy and Social Sciences
    Education Centre of Humanistic Quality

Faculty of Foreign Languages and Cultures

     Department of English Language and Literature
     Department of College English Teaching
     Department of English Teaching for Non-English Major Postgraduates
     MTI Education Center

City College

     Department of Architecture
     Department of Mechanical Engineering
     Department of Information Engineering
     Department of Civil Engineering
     Department of Art and Design
     Department of Accounting
     Department of Language Enhancement
     Department of Management and Economics
     Department of Earth Sciences
     Department of Public Foreign Language Teaching
     Department of Sports
     Department of General Core Courses
     Department of Communication Engineering
     Department of Traffic Engineering
     Department of Mechanical Engineering
     Department of Logistics Engineering

School of International Education School of Continuing Education Oxbridge College

=== Students ===
KUST recruits students from all over China, including Hong Kong, Macao, and Taiwan. In addition, KUST is authorized to recruit international students for degree programs ranging from Bachelor to Master and Ph.D. There are about 52,754 students studying at KUST; among them, nearly 20,331 were graduate students (2015).

KUST offers 64 Bachelor programs, 49 Master programs, and eight Ph.D. program areas. There are three state-authorized post-doctoral stations, one state-level key academic subject, and 14 province-level key academic subjects.

=== Staff ===
The staff numbers about 3,844 including academic and non-academic ones. Nearly 1,100 are professors and associate professors, and about 1,600 are full-time teaching staffs. There is one academician of China Academy of Engineering working for KUST and there are 17 academicians of China Academy of Science and of China Academy of Engineering jointly working for KUST.

=== Campuses and facilities ===
KUST is composed of three campuses, Chenggong, Lianhua, and Xinying. All are in Kunming City, occupying an area of about 120 hectares. The buildings on the campuses occupy over 730,000 square meters, and many important construction projects are in progress.

The university library has about 1.7 million volumes of books and periodicals, and the library is authorized as a state-level research document collection unit. KUST has founded a state-level engineering research center, two provincial and/or ministerial level test stations, two research and development centers, two key laboratories of provincial level, and one class-A design and research institute. There are 32 research institutes, 13 research laboratories, and 13 research centers.

=== Rankings and Reputation ===
In 2025, KUST ranked 301-400th globally by the Academic Ranking of World Universities (ARWU). The 2024 CWTS Leiden Ranking ranked KUST at #282 in the world based on their publications for the period 2019–2022. As of 2025, the Best Chinese Universities Ranking ranked KUST 2nd best in Yunnan Province after Yunnan University and 117th nationwide.

== Exchange and cooperation ==
=== Domestic ===
The university has ties with over 100 domestic local governments, institutions of higher education and research, as well as enterprises. The research activities in KUST play an important and critical role in Yunnan Province as well as in the southwest region of China. For the past two years, the increment of the research fund for KUST took a proportion of over two-thirds in the total increment for all the universities in Yunnan Province.

=== International ===
It has established cooperative and exchange relationships with nearly 70 universities in about 30 countries. One is Lamar University in Beaumont, Texas.
