= Premnitz =

- Town
- Coat of arms

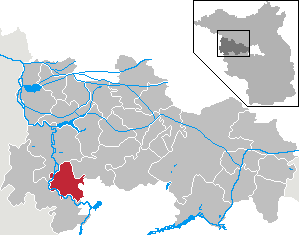
- Location of Premnitz within Havelland district
- Interactive map of Premnitz
- Location within Germany Location within Brandenburg
- Coordinates: 52°32′N 12°20′E
- Country: Germany
- State: Brandenburg
- District: Havelland

Government
  - Mayor (2024–32): Thomas Rosenberg

Area
  - Total: 46.27 km^{2} (17.86 sq mi)
- Elevation: 30 m (98 ft)

Population (2025-12-31)
  - Total: 7,966
  - Density: 172.2/km^{2} (445.9/sq mi)
- Time zone: UTC+01:00 (CET)
  - Summer (DST): UTC+02:00 (CEST)
- Postal codes: 14727
- Dialling codes: 03386
- Vehicle registration: HVL
- Website: www.premnitz.de

Premnitz (German: [ˈpʁɛmnɪts]) is a town in the Havelland district, in Brandenburg, Germany. It is situated on the river Havel, 8 km south of Rathenow, 21 km northwest of Brandenburg, and is only 75 km west of central Berlin, to where it is well connected by the railway and road networks. The surrounding landscape is very rural and forested in its make up.

== Overview ==
In order to counteract the economic impact of the decline of the synthetic fibres industry, a lot of effort is being expended so as to utilise a mix of industries, more in tune with the demand for industry that is in harmony with contemporary environmental policies. One such example is Firstwood: a factory which specialises in the thermo-treatment of soft, locally grown and harvested pine, so that it is as resilient to the elements as many of its hardwood alternatives.

It is also envisaged that because of the town's proximity to Berlin and Potsdam, for example, and the development of high quality recreational facilities, Premnitz may be considered as a good place to live and commute to work, as an alternative to living in the city.

== Demography ==
Development of Population since 1875 within the Current Boundaries (Blue Line: Population; Dotted Line: Comparison to Population Development of Brandenburg state; Grey Background: Time of Nazi rule; Red Background: Time of Communist rule)

Recent Population Development and Projections (Population Development before Census 2011 (blue line); Recent Population Development according to the Census in Germany in 2011 (blue bordered line); Official projections for 2005-2030 (yellow line); for 2017-2030 (scarlet line); for 2020-2030 (green line)

Premnitz: Population development
within the current boundaries (2020)

Year	Pop.	±% p.a.
1875	1,353	—
1890	1,651	+1.34%
1910	1,700	+0.15%
1925	3,520	+4.97%
1939	5,923	+3.79%
1950	8,387	+3.21%
1964	12,126	+2.67%

Year	Pop.	±% p.a.
1971	13,724	+1.78%
1981	13,447	−0.20%
1985	13,358	−0.17%
1990	12,832	−0.80%
1995	11,945	−1.42%
2000	11,018	−1.60%
2005	9,850	−2.22%

Year	Pop.	±% p.a.
2010	8,893	−2.02%
2015	8,422	−1.08%
2020	8,368	−0.13%
2021	8,290	−0.93%
2022	8,335	+0.54%
2023	8,307	−0.34%

== Sons and daughters of the city ==
- Hans-Peter Grohganz (1948-1981), died at the Berlin Wall
- Karsten Heinz (born 1960), handball goalkeeper and coach
- Anke Domscheit-Berg (born 1968), entrepreneur and politician
