= Lee Schipper =

American energy expert (1947–2011)

Leon Jay "Lee" Schipper (April 7, 1947 – August 16, 2011) was a physicist and energy efficiency expert who authored more than 100 technical papers and a number of books on energy economics and transportation. He was "often a critic of the conventional wisdom." He was remembered by climate scientists as "a giant" who "was brilliant at articulating the connections among technology, economics, culture, policy and politics."

== Education ==
Schipper attended the University of California at Berkeley. He earned a bachelor's degrees in Physics and Music in 1968, and a Ph.D. in astrophysics.

== Career ==
Schipper worked at the Lawrence Berkeley National Lab (LBNL) for more than 20 years. In addition, he worked at the Energy and Resources Group at UC Berkeley, Shell International in London, as well as being Fulbright Scholar at the Beijer Institute of Ecological Economics in Stockholm. He was a guest researcher at the World Bank, VVS Tekniska Foereningen, the OECD, and the Stockholm Environment Institute. He worked closely with the Global Business Network and Cambridge Energy Research Associates.

He served on the editorial boards of five major journals and was a member of the Swedish Board for Transportation and Communications Research. For four years he was a member of the U.S. National Academy of Sciences' Transportation Research Board's Committee on Sustainable Transport and Committee on Developing Countries.

At the time of his death, Schipper was a senior research scientist at both University of California Berkeley’s Global Metropolitan Studies and at the Precourt Institute of Energy Efficiency at Stanford University conducting research and policy analysis on efficient energy use in transportation systems.

=== Energy Efficient Housing ===
Schipper's first seminal contribution came in 1976, when he published an influential paper in Science pointing out that Sweden consumed far less energy per unit of economic activity than the United States did. His work on the energy efficiency of Swedish housing culminated in his 1985 book Coming in from the Cold with Stephen Meyers and Henry Kelly. Schipper testified before Congress on this subject in March 1984.

=== Transportation ===
Schipper shifted his primary attention to transport in the 1980s and started the Berkeley Lab's International Energy Studies group with Jayant Sathaye, and the two co-led the group for many years.

He was co-founder of EMBARQ, the World Resources Institute Center for Sustainable Transport, and remained as a senior associate emeritus.

=== Climate Change ===
From 1995 to 2001, he was a senior scientist at the International Energy Agency in Paris.

He contributed to the Second and Third Assessment Reports of the Intergovernmental Panel on Climate Change, which was awarded the Nobel Peace Prize in 2007. He was due to act as Review Editor for the chapter on Transport in Working Group III's contribution to the Fifth Assessment Report, released in April 2014.

== Legacy ==
John Holdren, later to become Science Advisor to President Barack Obama, was the first person to hire Schipper as an energy specialist, at Berkeley in the early 1970s. He said ‘‘Lee was one of the first people to point out that people don’t want to consume energy, but they want to consume energy services, like transportation, comfortable rooms, cold beer and so forth. And that there was an enormous variation in the amount of energy needed to perform those services.’’

Mark Levine, who was Schipper’s supervisor for most his career at LBNL, said: "Lee was the founding father of a school of energy analysts, a tradition carried on with vigor in the Energy Analysis Department at LBNL.... The work he did has been carried on here. He created an important tradition of understanding energy by studying it from the bottom up, which means by end user." Schipper broke new ground by analyzing energy data sector by sector and end-use by end-use in various countries and comparing them. He demonstrated that energy intensity did not correlate with GDP in any simple way and was able to show why.

== Personal ==
He was described as being an irrepressible iconoclast with a wonderful knack of turning a phrase to excellent effect. Evidence for this was publishing 15 letters to the editor in the New York Times on energy efficiency. For example, in his view the "cash for clunkers" program—which offered rebates to people who bought a new car with better mileage than their old one—did little to save energy, although it may have reduced air pollution. In many cases, buyers used the rebate to buy something bigger and more high-powered than they would have otherwise. "The effect is inverse of what we were hoping for" he said.

Schipper was also an accomplished musician. He was the leader of the University of California Jazz Quintet in 1968. As a UC Berkeley student and vibraphonist, he led his jazz group to victory at the Notre Dame Jazz Festival in 1967. In 1969 Danish saxophonist Carsten Meinert invited him to record on his album "C.M. Musictrain" in Denmark (Spectator Records). In 1973 he recorded "The Phunky Physicist" with Swedish guitar player Janne Schaffer. He would reprise the role as band leader with an ad hoc jazz group, Lee Schipper and the Mitigators, who performed primarily in conjunction with energy-related conferences.

He was also one of the world's experts on Wilhelm Furtwangler, a 20th-century symphonic and operatic conductor, and collected one of the most complete sets of his recordings.

== Publications ==
- 1985: (lead author) Coming in from the Cold: Energy-wise Housing in Sweden (American Council for an Energy Efficient Economy)
- 1992: (lead author) Energy Efficiency and Human Activity: Past Trends, Future Prospects (Cambridge University Press)
- 1992: (co-author) "Environmentally Benign Automobiles" Access Magazine
- 1993: (lead author) "Mind the Gap: The Vicious Circle of Measuring Automobile Fuel Use" Energy Policy
- 2001: (co-author) Transportation in Developing Countries: Greenhouse Gas Scenarios for Delhi, India (Institute for Transportation Studies, UC Davis)
- 2005: (co-author) Growing in the Greenhouse: Protecting the Climate by Putting Development First (World Resources Institute)
- 2006: (co-author) Measuring the Invisible: Quantifying Emissions Reductions from Transport Solutions - Querétaro Case Study (World Resources Institute)
- 2008: (lead author) Measuring The Invisible: Quantifying Emissions Reductions From Transport Solutions - Hanoi Case Study (World Resources Institute)
- 2009: (lead author) Transport and Carbon Dioxide Emissions: Forecasts, Options Analysis, and Evaluation (Asian Development Bank)
