= Honda Civic (seventh generation) =

Honda Civic Seventh generation (EU/ES/EP/EM)
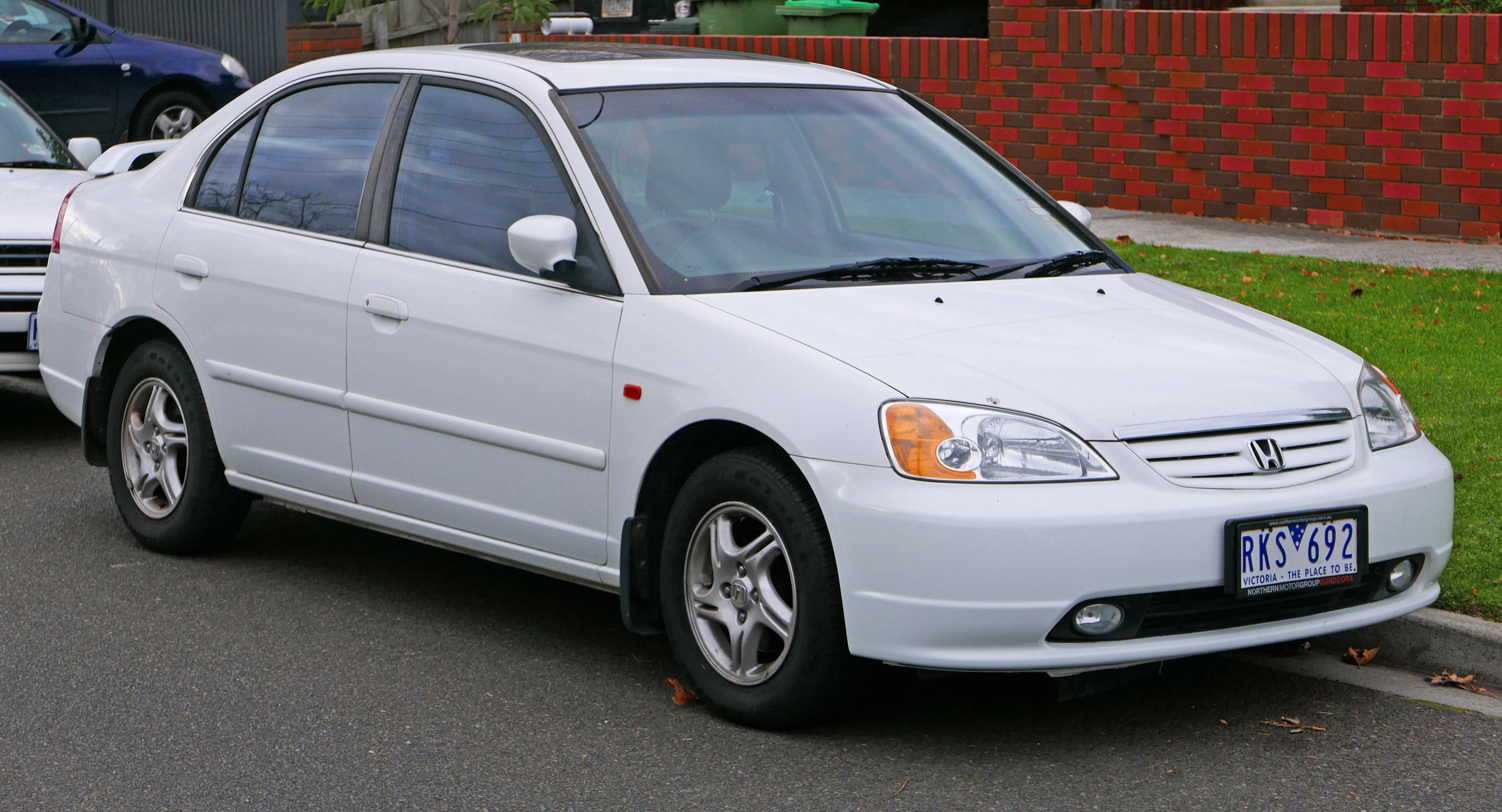

Overview
- Manufacturer: Honda
- Also called: Honda Civic Ferio (sedan, Japan)
- Production: June 2000–September 2005
- Model years: 2001–2005
- Assembly: Swindon, United Kingdom (hatchback versions only); Suzuka, Japan; Lahore, Pakistan; East Liberty, Ohio, United States; Alliston, Ontario, Canada; Hsinchu, Taiwan (Contract manufacturing ended 2002); Ayutthaya, Thailand; Sumaré, Brazil; Santa Rosa City, Laguna, Philippines; Gebze, Turkey; Alor Gajah, Malaysia; North Jakarta, Indonesia (2001–2003); Karawang, Indonesia (2003–2005)
- Designer: Shuji Koman (sedan: 1997, coupe: 1998); Satoshi Kazama (Si: 1999)

Body and chassis
- Class: Compact car
- Body style: 2-door coupé (EM, North America and Europe only); 3-door hatchback (EP); 4-door sedan (ES); 5-door hatchback (EU)
- Layout: Front-engine, front-wheel-drive
- Related: Honda Integra (fourth generation); Acura EL; Honda CR-V; Honda FR-V; Honda Stream

Powertrain
- Engine: gasoline: 1.4 L D14Z6 I4; 1.5 L D15Y3/Z6 I4; 1.6 L D16V1/W7/W9 I4; 1.7 L D17A1/A6 I4; 1.7 L D17A2 VTEC LEV I4; 2.0 L K20A2/A3 I4; gasoline hybrid: 1.3 L LDA I4; diesel: 1.7 L Isuzu 4EE2 I4
- Transmission: 5/6-speed manual 4/5-speed automatic Continuously variable transmission
- Hybrid drivetrain: Parallel hybrid

Dimensions
- Wheelbase: 2,620 mm (103.1 in) (sedan/coupé); 2,581 mm (101.6 in) (3-door hatchback)
- Length: 4,437 mm (174.7 in) (2001-03 coupé); 4,435 mm (174.6 in) (2001-03 sedan); 4,277 mm (168.4 in) (3-door hatchback); 4,455 mm (175.4 in) (2004-05 sedan/coupe)
- Width: 1,720 mm (67.7 in) (Int'l); 1,694 mm (66.7 in) (Japan)
- Height: 1,400 mm (55.1 in) (coupé); 1,440 mm (56.7 in) (sedan); 1,491 mm (58.7 in) (3-door hatchback)
- Curb weight: 1,245 kg (2,745 lb) (hatchback); 1,091 kg (2,405 lb) (coupé); 1,098 kg (2,421 lb) (sedan)

Chronology
- Predecessor: Honda Civic (sixth generation); Honda Domani (MB3-5)
- Successor: Honda Civic (eighth generation)

The seventh-generation Honda Civic is an automobile produced by Honda from 2000 until 2005. It debuted in September 2000 as a 2001 model. Its exterior dimensions stayed similar to the outgoing predecessor, with interior space significantly increased, bumping it up to the compact car size designation. A notable feature was the flat rear floor that gave better comfort to the rear seat passengers. This generation abandoned the front double wishbone suspension, used previously from fourth to sixth generations, replacing it with MacPherson struts. This generation was the last to offer 4WD variants.

Upon its introduction in 2000, it won the Car of the Year Japan Award for a record fourth time. It also won the Japan Automotive Researchers' and Journalists' Conference Car of the Year award in 2001.

== History ==
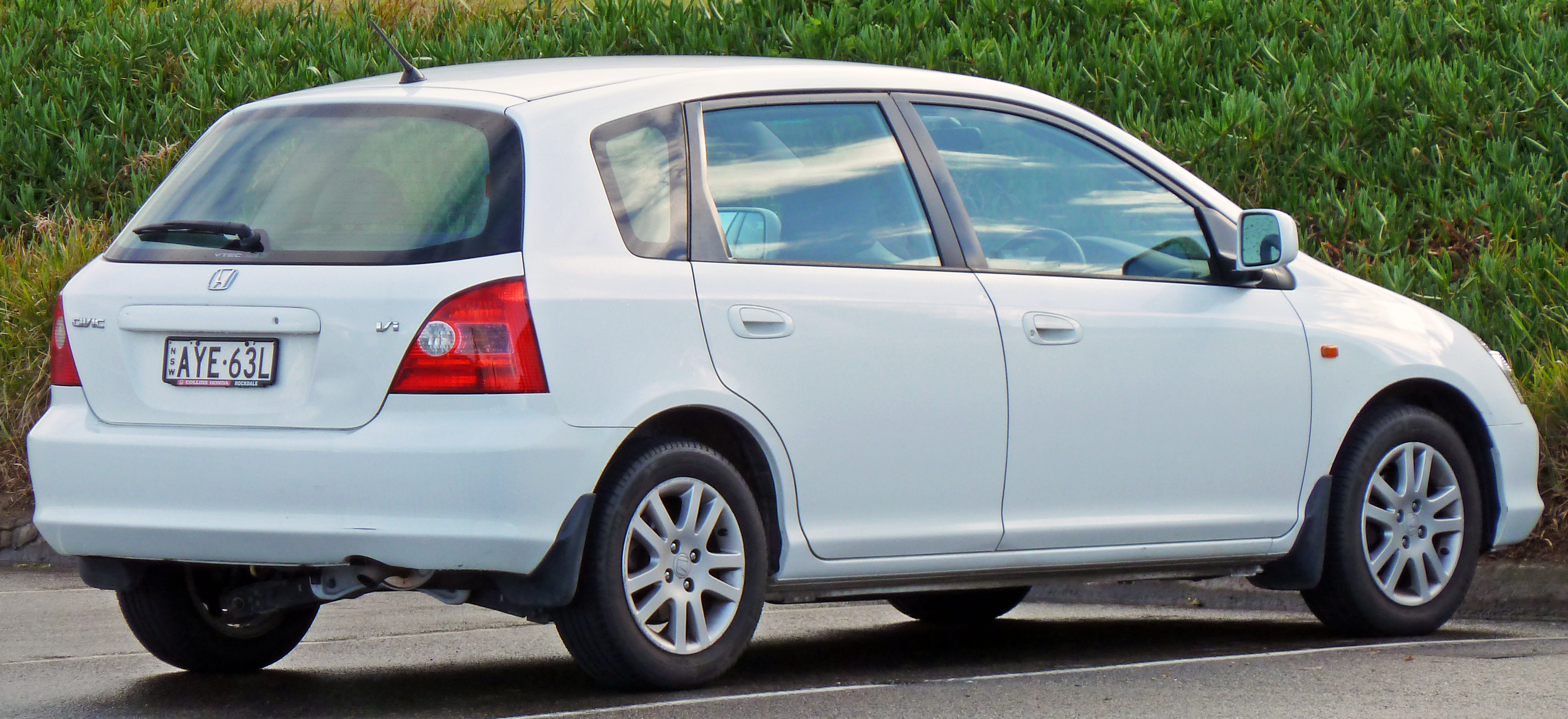
5-door hatchback (pre-facelift)

The Spring of 2002 debuted the hybrid version in North America as the 2003 model. It used both a small 1.3-liter I4 main gasoline engine and auxiliary electric motors, producing a combined 93 hp. The electric motors are powered by a battery array which is charged by regenerative braking during deceleration, thus reducing exhaust emissions and extending fuel mileage to 46 mpg city / 51 mpg highway with the manual transmission according to EPA fuel mileage estimates. The Hybrid also had unique lightweight wheels, a rear spoiler, different front bumper, folding mirrors, and aerodynamic enhancements underneath.

The Civic received a facelift in late 2003 (2004 model year) with new headlights, bumper, and grille; it also received side skirts, and body-coloured bonnet and boot trim. In September 2004, the Special Edition trim level was introduced for the 2005 model year, available as the LX or EX Special Edition.

A sporting hatchback model called the Si was unveiled in August 2005 for the European market only. This model featured from launch a 1.4-liter i-DSI and a 1.6-liter VTEC rated at 83 PS (81 hp/61 kW) and 140 PS (138 hp/103 kW) respectively, with 177 and 207 km/h (110 and 129 mph) top speeds and 14.2 and 13.6 s 0–100 km/h sprint. The Sport Hatchback was also available with a 1.7-liter diesel engine.

Starting with this generation, cabin air filters (also known as pollen filters) were installed as standard equipment and are located behind the glove compartment internationally.

== Markets ==
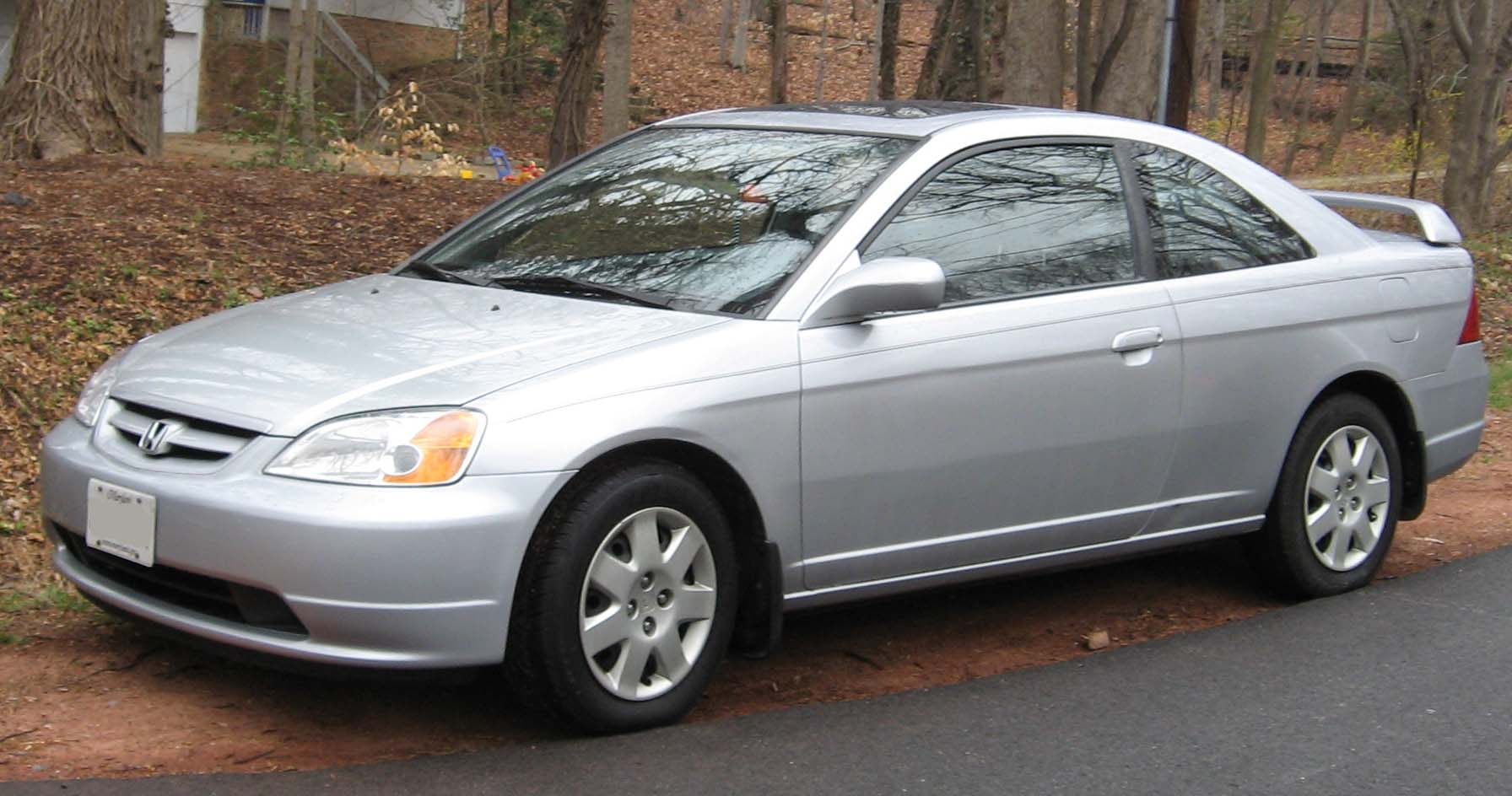
Coupe (pre-facelift)

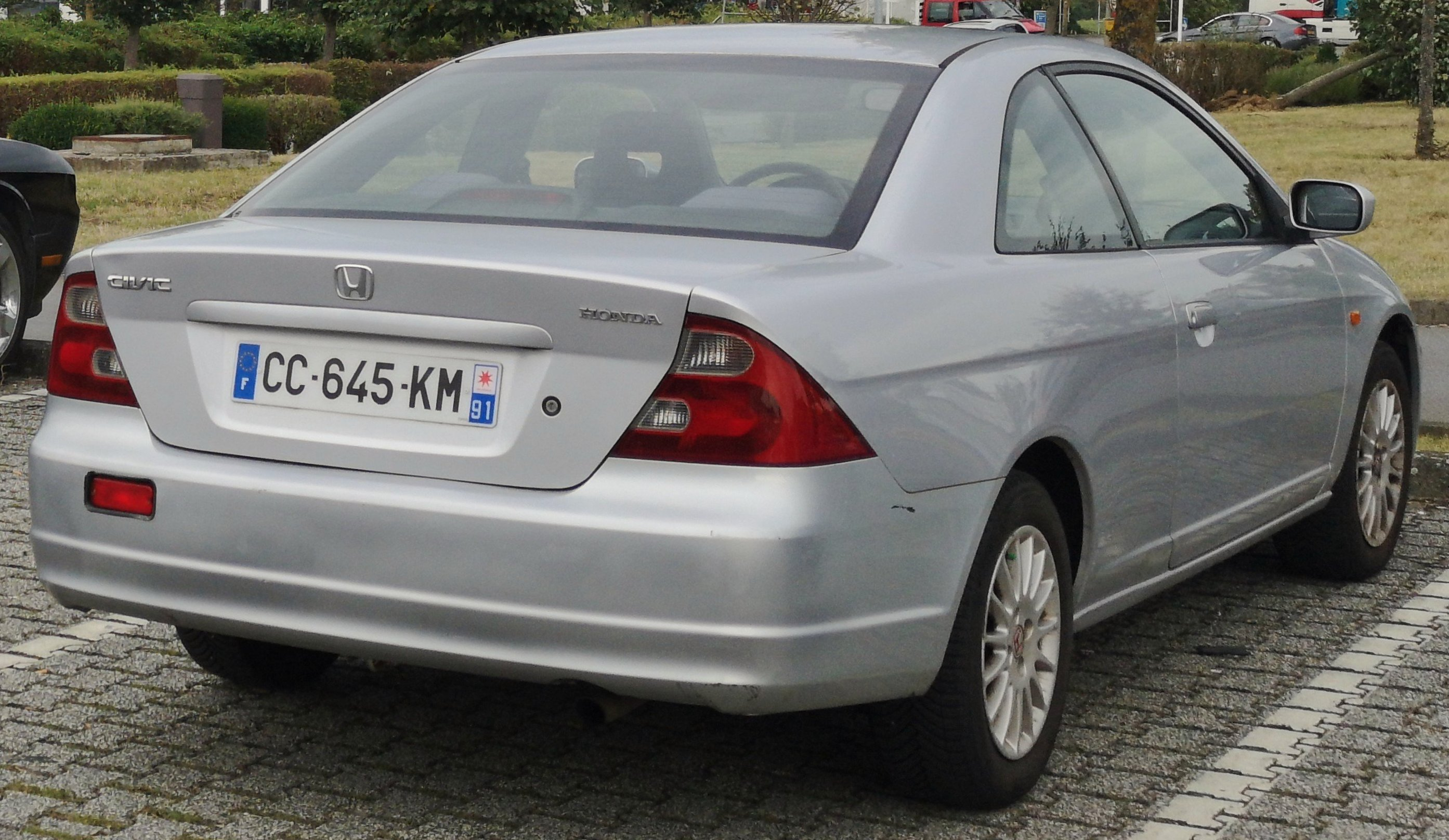
Coupe (pre-facelift)

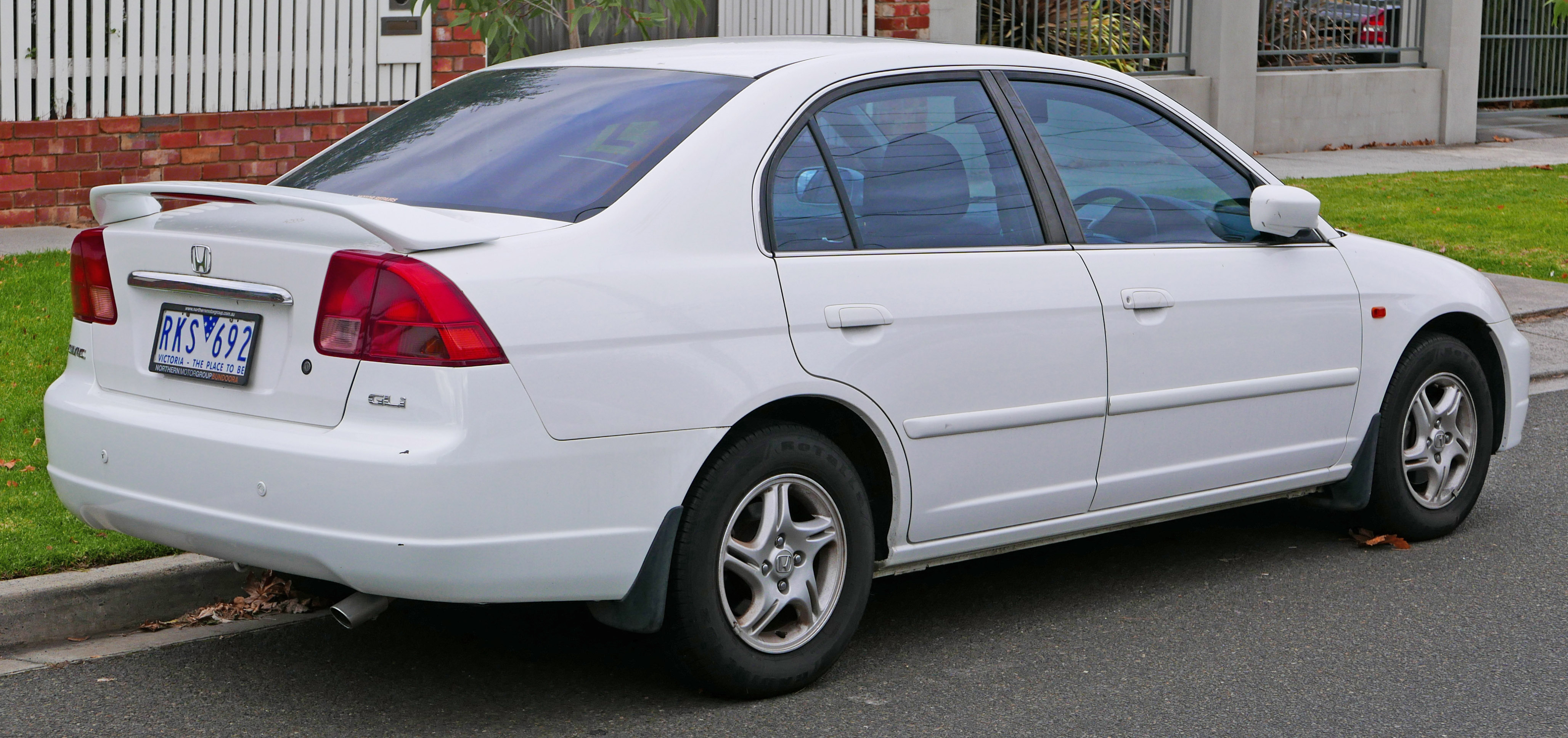
Sedan (pre-facelift)

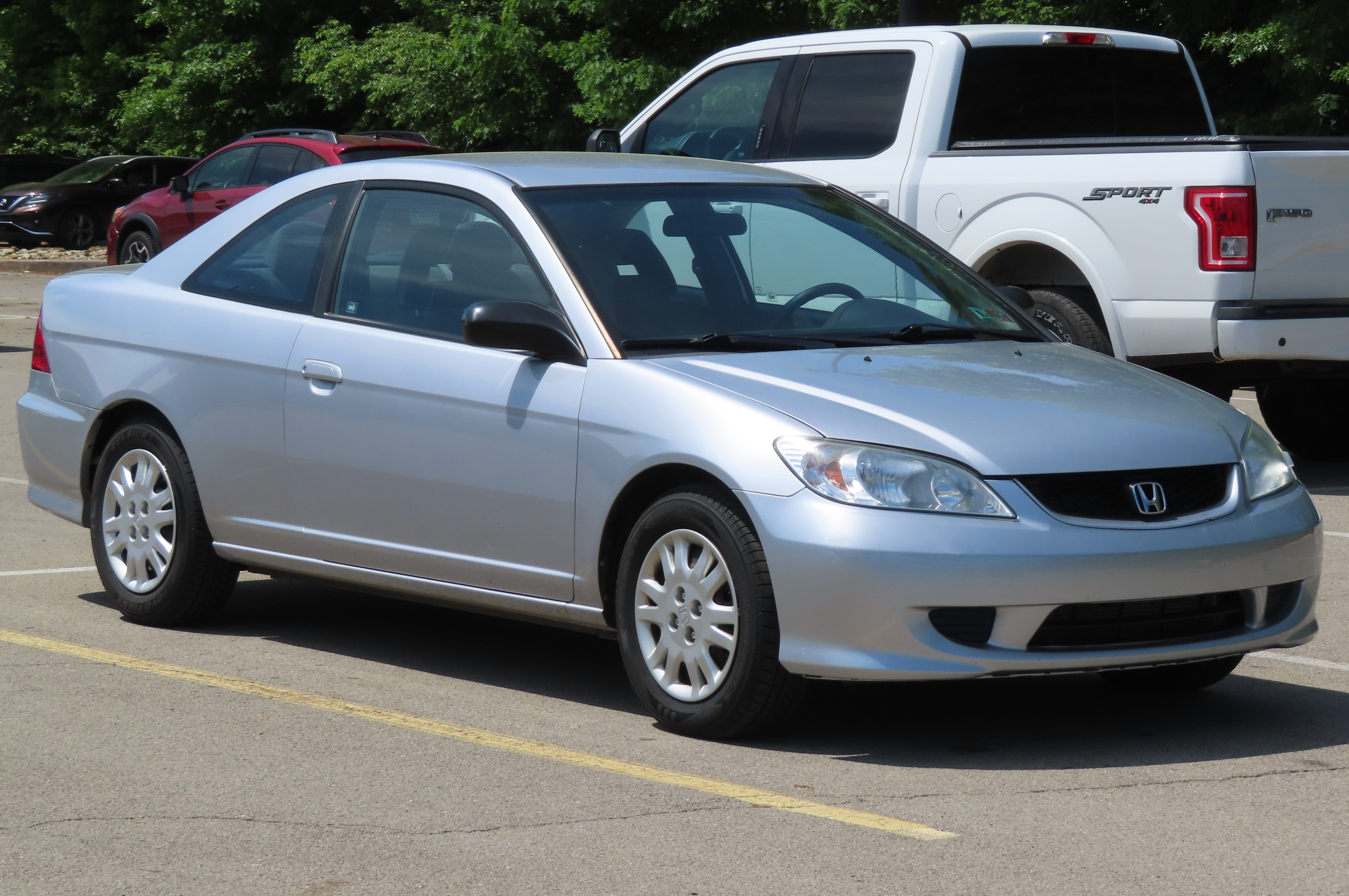
Coupe (facelift)

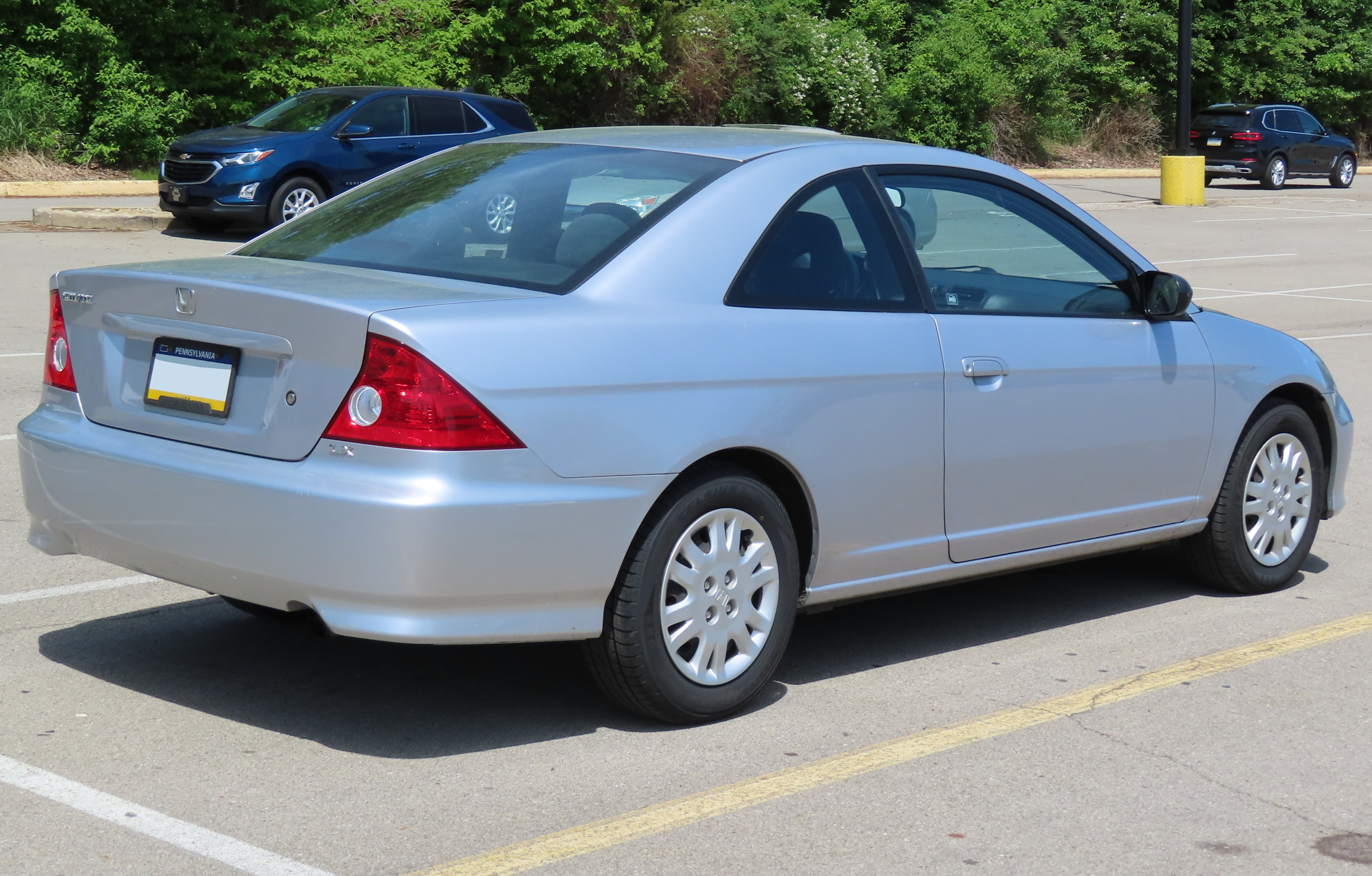
Coupe (facelift)

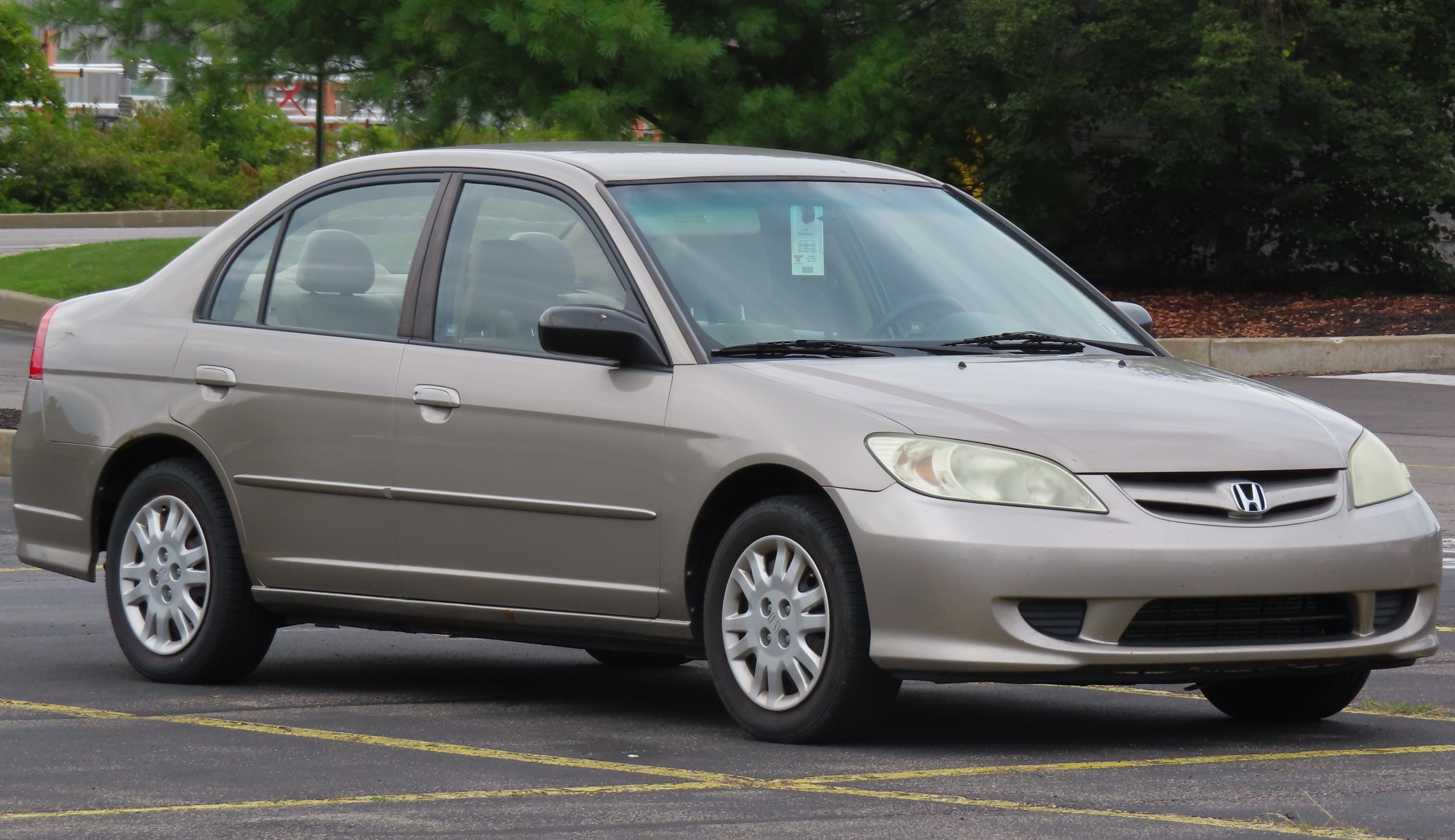
2005 Honda Civic LX sedan

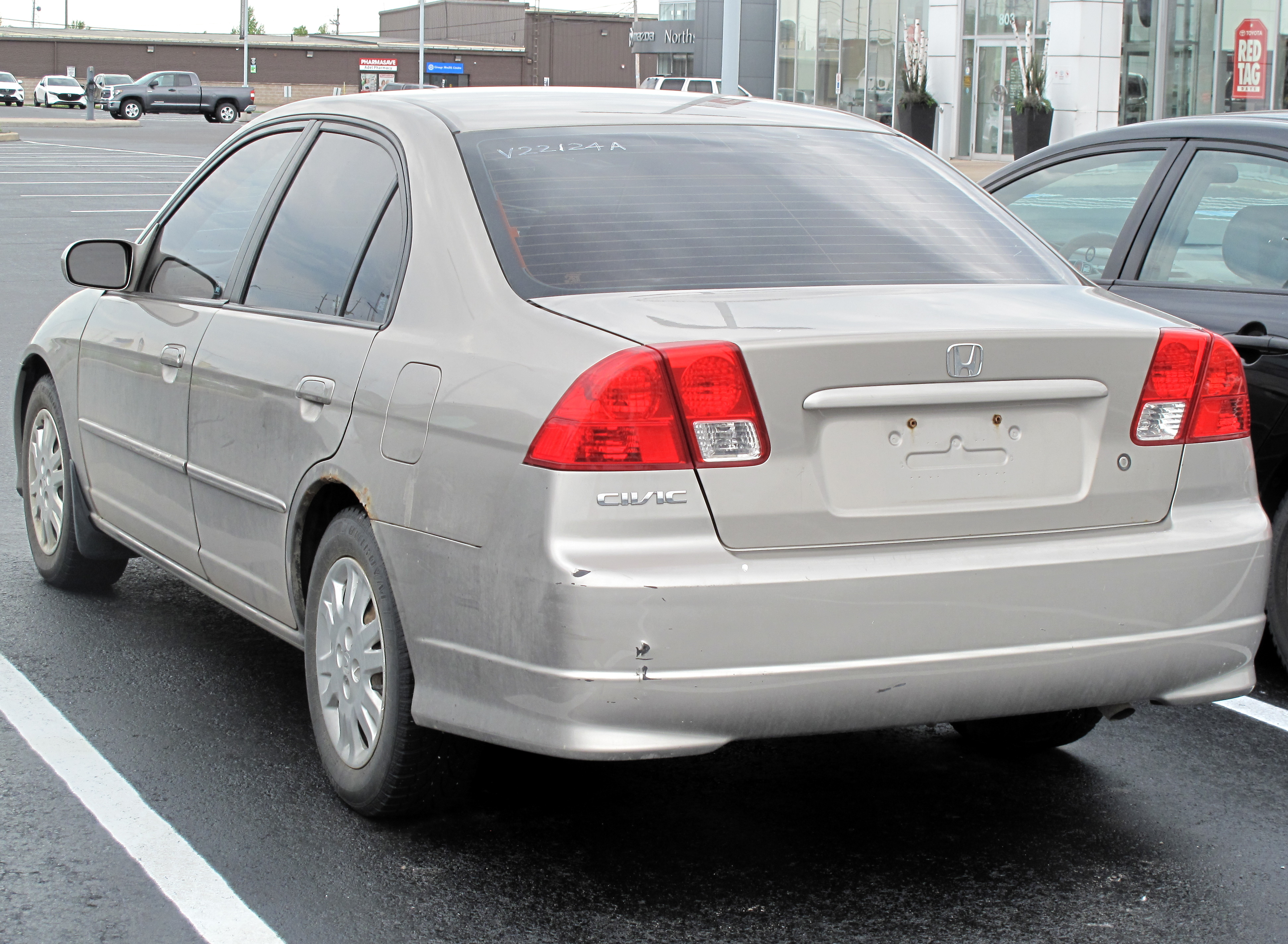
Sedan (facelift)

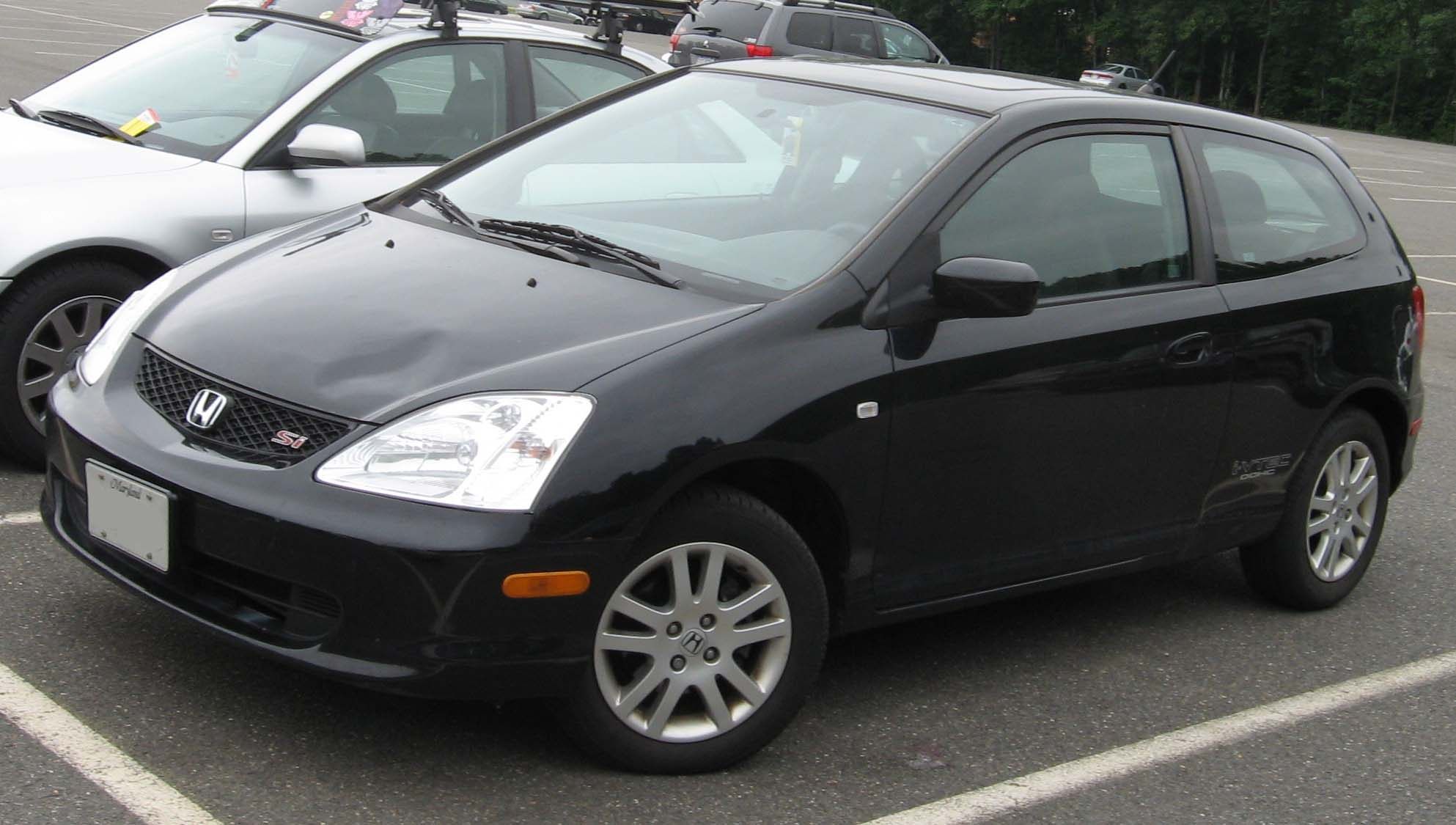
2002-03 Honda Civic Si (US)

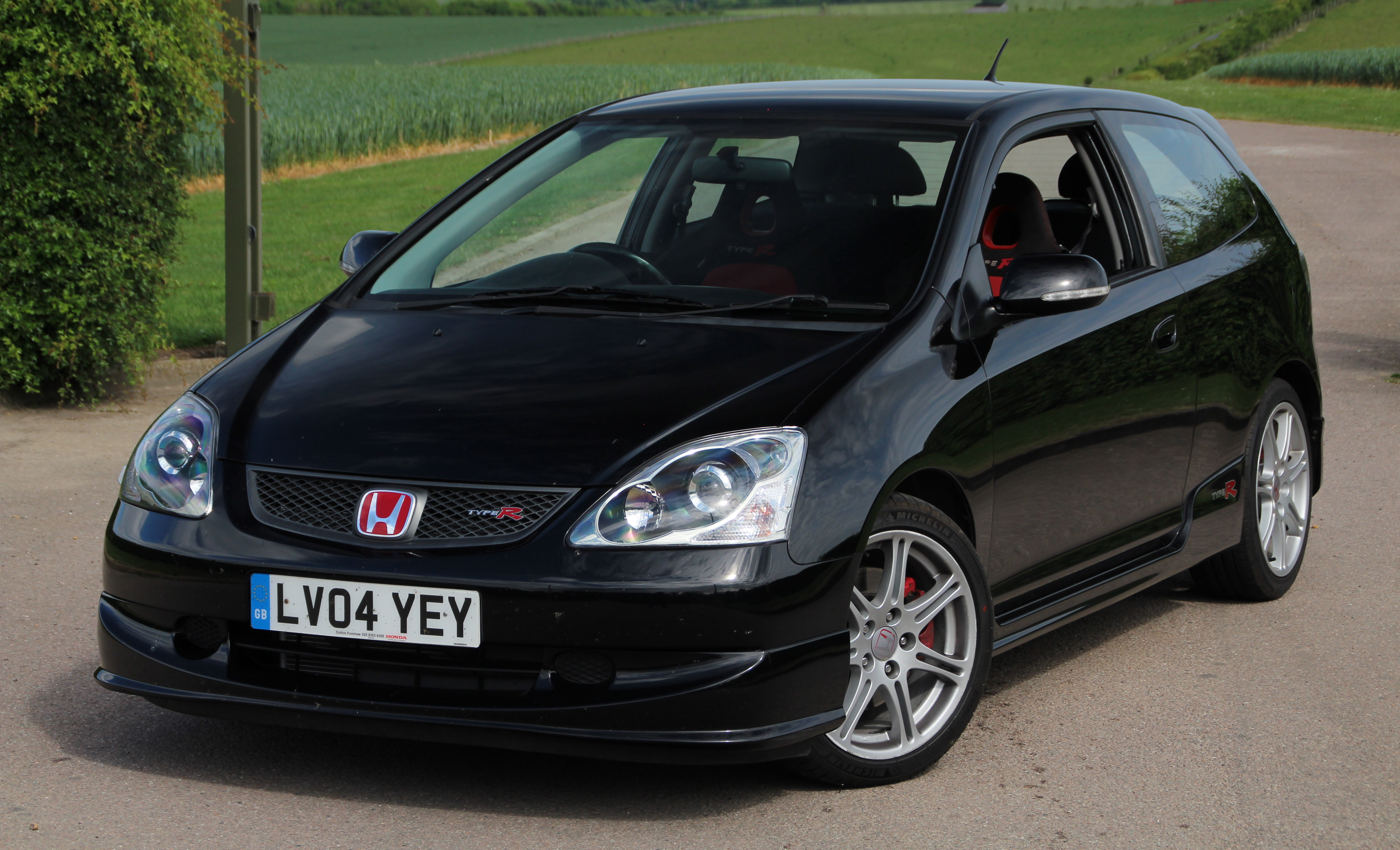
Honda Civic Type R

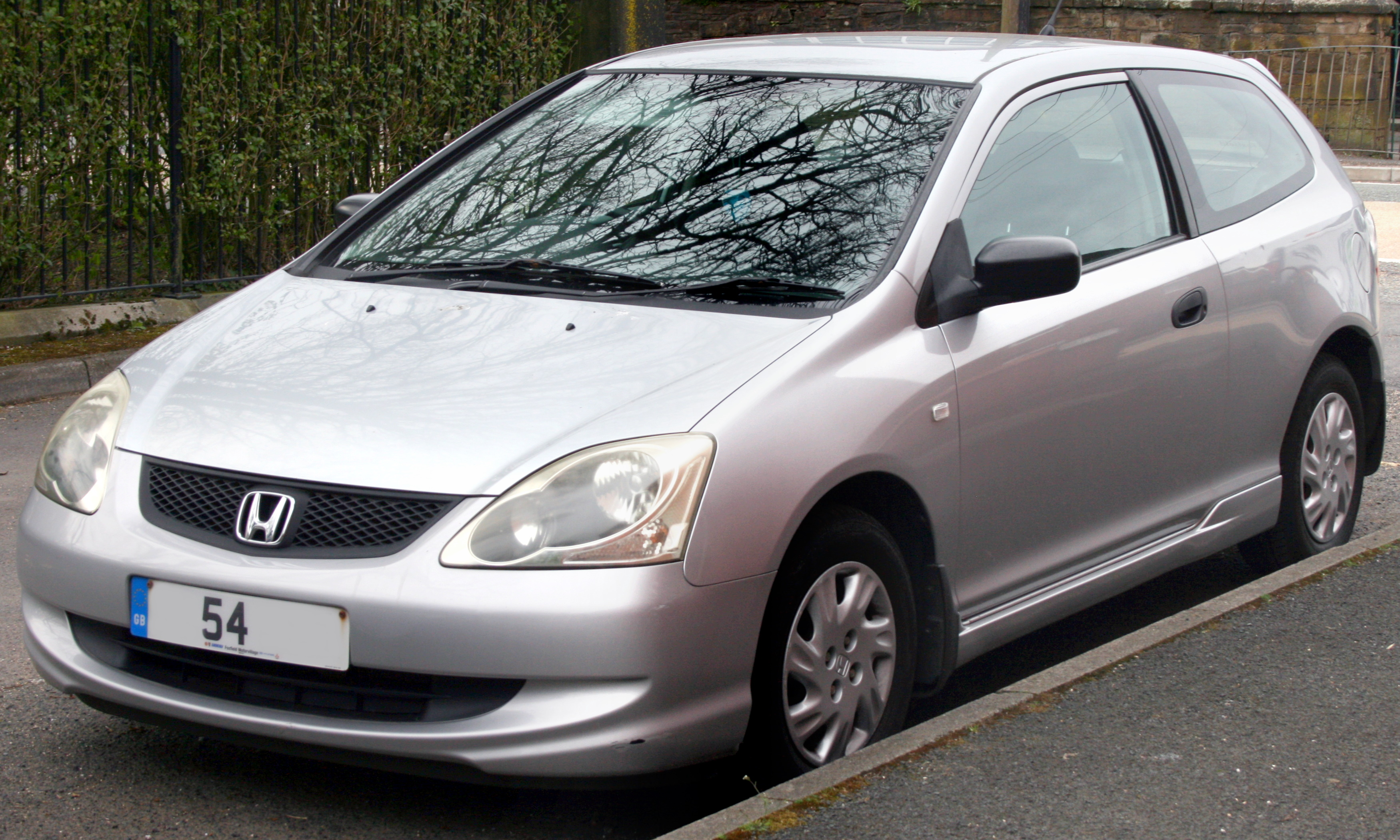

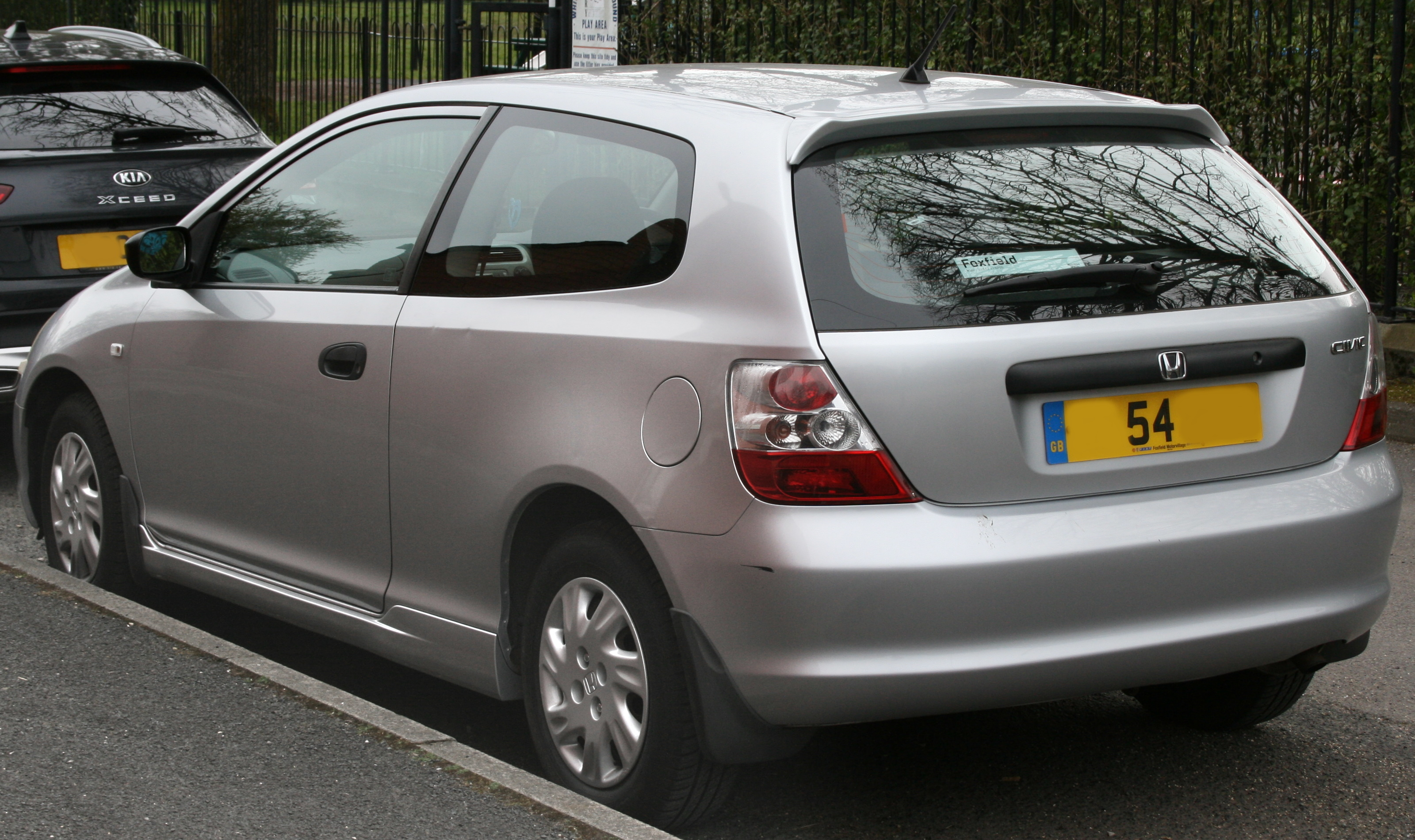
3-door hatchback (facelift)

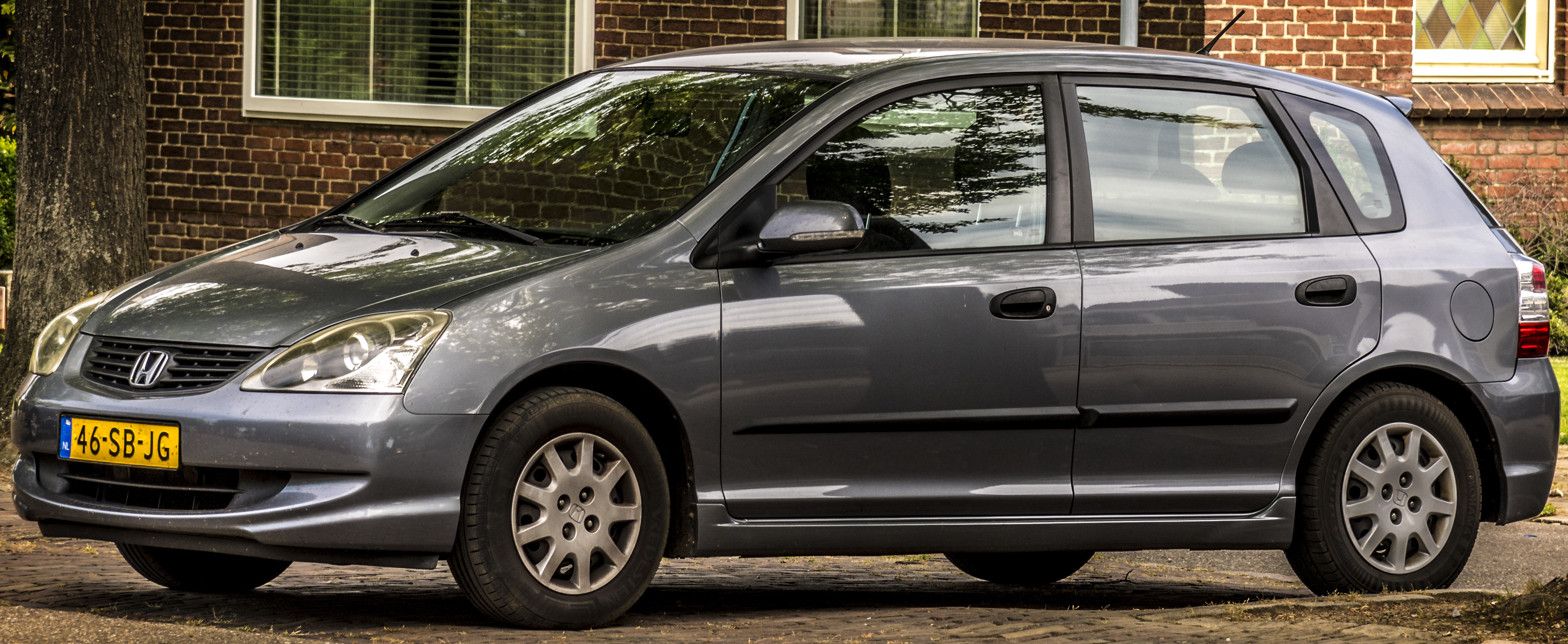

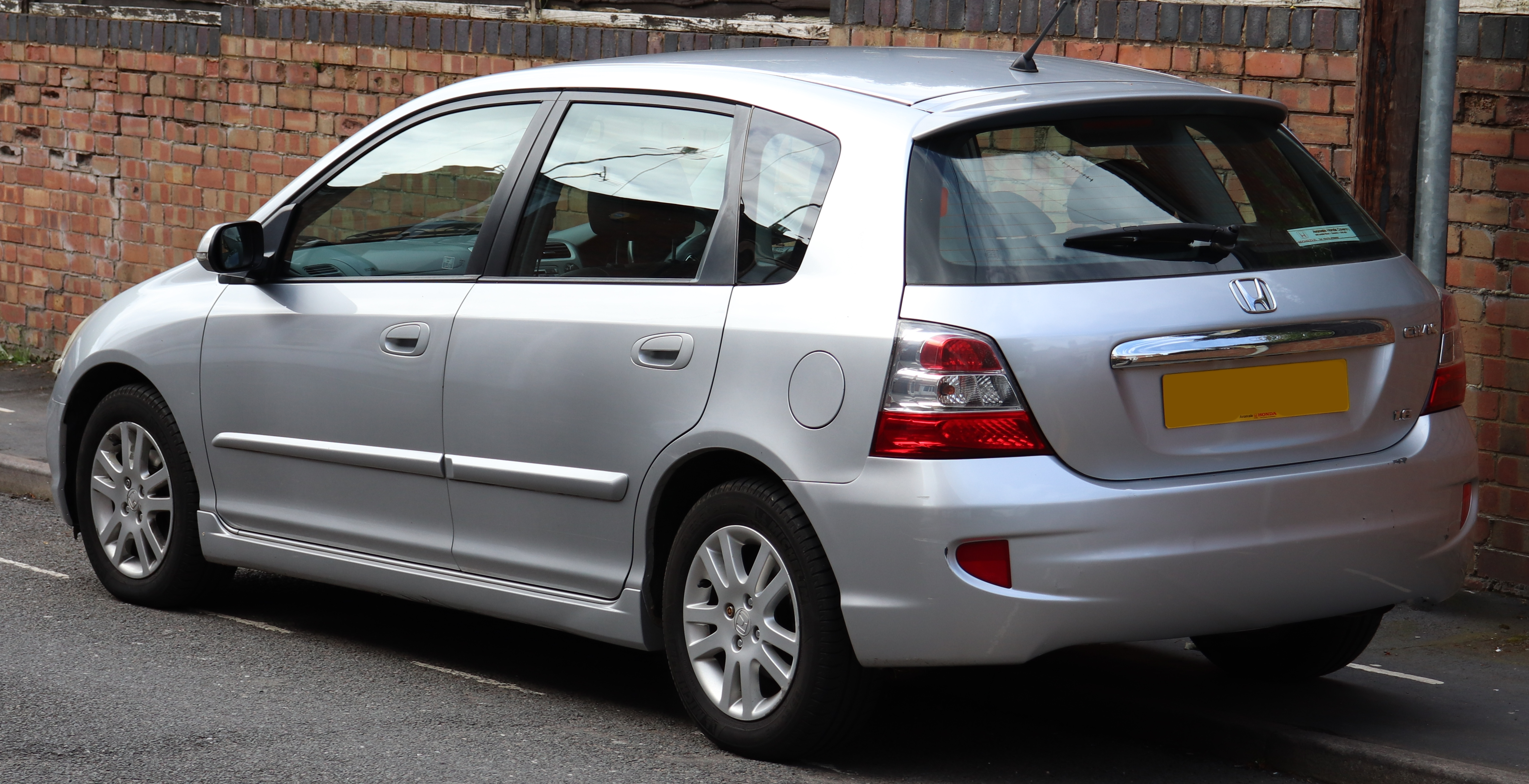
5-door hatchback (facelift)

=== Japan (JDM) ===
In Japan, a VTEC-E equipped 1.5-litre version was marketed with a CVT transmission called "Honda Multimatic". This was discontinued in September 2003.

The EP3 Civic Si hatchback body shell was also used for the second-generation Civic Type R which was sold only in Europe and Japan.

Honda of Europe designed the EP3 Civic Type R hatchback to be marketed in Europe. Then Honda of Japan marketed the EP3 Civic Type R using the more powerful DC5 Integra Japanese-spec K20A powertrain and an electric steering rack.

=== USDM (United States and Canada) ===
Coupe: Trim levels available in North America for the coupe body style were the VP, DX (up to 2003), HX, LX (EM2), EX, LX Special Edition or EX Special Edition, Si and RAJ. The coupe, no longer available in Japan, was still sold in Europe.

Sedan: Trim levels available in the sedan body style were the DX (ES1), VP (ES1), LX (ES1), EX (ES2), LX Special Edition (ES1), EX Special Edition (ES2), GX (EN2), and MX Hybrid (ES9). EX trim includes sunroof. The LX, EX & RAJ Special Edition included a six-disc changer, rear spoiler, ABS, larger 15-inch wheels and a more powerful engine (see below). There was also the EX Special Edition which added a sunroof and rear single cup holder. The Hybrid was the only trim available for the sedan style in Europe.

In Canada, until 2003, there were DX and LX trims for both sedan and coupe, with the coupe additionally having the Si trim, largely equivalent to the US market EX coupe.

In 2002, Honda Canada, in recognition of the one millionth sale of the Civic in Canada, introduced a limited-edition version of the Civic called the Civic Coupe Si Veloz ("Veloz" - Spanish word, meaning "fast"). The Veloz edition adds a front, rear and side skirts, rear spoiler, carbon fibre trim pieces, chrome exhaust tip, custom Veloz embroidered floor mats and Veloz badges.

In 2003, a 30th Anniversary Edition was added to all models, as well as a Sport model for sedans. In 2004, the DX trim was replaced by a Special Edition (SE) model and the previous Sport model was replaced by a LX-G trim.

==== Si / SiR ====
The US (Si) was badged SiR in Canada. Unlike other generations of the Civic Si, this one was not produced in Canada or the United States, and it does not share a body style or interior with the USDM Civic (offered only in sedan and coupé forms) sold there. Instead, the 2002-05 Civic Si/SiR is manufactured in Swindon, England, and exported to Canada and the United States. The Si/SiR was the only trim available for the hatchback style in Canada and the United States.

The Civic Si returned to form as a hatchback, after having been sold only as a coupé in the previous generation. The body shape of this model was based on the "New Bullet-Form" concept, which aimed to create a more dynamic look and provide greater stability while travelling on highways or winding country roads. The interior layout also distinguished itself from other Civic Si generations with a dash-mounted shifter.

Shifting away from the 1.6 liter D-series engine, the seventh-generation Civic Si adopted the K-series K20A3 engine used in the Acura RSX base model rated at 160 bhp (120 kW) at 6,500 rpm and 132 lbf⋅ft (179 N⋅m) at 5,000 rpm. With a redline of 6,800 rpm, the Si distanced itself from the narrow, high-rpm powerband engine of its predecessor, and as a result saw a 20 percent increase in torque. Performance was relatively underwhelming compared to the competition; the switch to MacPherson strut from double-wishbone suspension resulted in less responsive handling, and a near-150 lb (68 kg) increase in weight to 2,744 lb (1,245 kg) contributed to slower acceleration than the lighter '99-'00 Si. The new front suspension did allow for a tighter turning radius than the better handling wishbone setup used earlier. Much of the weight gain is attributed to the chassis' stouter structure when compared to the previous-generation hatchback, with the '02 Si boasting an increase in torsional rigidity by 95 percent and a bending rigidity increase of 22 percent.

The fifth-generation Civic Si saw roughly the same performance numbers as the previous-generation Si, with 7.6 seconds to 60 mph and 15.9 seconds at the quarter mile, which were comparable to that of Ford SVT Focus and Hyundai Tiburon GT V6. Other factors adversely impacting performance included the lack of a limited-slip differential, having to shift into third gear to get from zero to 60, and increased curb weight due to a stiffer chassis. Other changes include a switch to electric power steering over hydraulic and coil on plug ignition.

Features of this generation Si include: Dash-mounted shifter, 15-inch (2002–03) or 16-inch wheels (2004–05), air conditioning, electronic power steering, power windows, power locks, remote keyless entry, AM/FM radio, CD player, clock, cruise control, cloth bucket seats, 4 interior cup holders, center console and folding rear seats.

The EP3's unique body style in the U.S., having been designed for the Japanese and European markets, has more distinct lighting compared to other North American designs. While the 2002–03 models have red rear turn signals and combined high/low beam headlights, the 2004 and 2005 models have dual separate high and low beam headlights, individual parking lights in the headlight housings, amber turn signals, amber side fender turn signals, four individual side markers at all corners, and the ability to shut off all lights while driving.

The 2004–2005 models received minor revisions. Cosmetic changes included revised headlight (dual bulb setup) and tail light designs, standard side skirts, and an option for a HFP (Honda Factory Performance) upgrade. The suspension was updated with a change from 4-lug to 5-lug bolt pattern, a larger rear sway bar, and a change from 15-inch wheels (195/60-15) to 16-inch wheels (205/55-16). The interior received more silver accents in place of the chrome ones (the lock switch).

2003 Honda Civic Si Concept (2002)

For the 2002 SEMA show, Honda unveiled the 2003 Civic Si Concept, which showcased the aftermarket versatility of the Si.

Powertrain/chassis modifications included a GReddy T518Z turbocharger with an integral wastegate, a prototype GReddy front-mounted intercooler kit with aluminum piping, a GReddy Airinx high-flow intake system, a GReddy e-manage engine control manager, a GReddy Profec E-01 electronic boost controller (with e-manage programmer), widened track, Factory Performance sport suspension, a center mounted high-flow exhaust system and a four-piston Brembo brake system.

The exterior saw changes including a Rally-inspired body kit, a carbon fiber grille, front intake and rear bumper diffuser, a black chrome-finish headlights and smoked taillights, high-mounted two-stage rear wing. For the interior, Honda included Mugen carbon fiber and Kevlar race seats covered in red Alcantara suede with 6-point racing harness, a sport 3-spoke steering wheel, aluminum pedals and shift knob, Mugen high performance LCD screen gauge package and center mounted information display.

=== Asia ===
==== Civic i-VTEC / Sport ====
Using the same K20A3 engine block as the US Civic Si, the Civic i-VTEC / Civic Sport was sold in sedan body shell only to inside Asia and manufactured by Honda Automobile Thailand in Ayutthaya, Thailand. These were also exported to ASEAN countries.

=== Malaysia ===
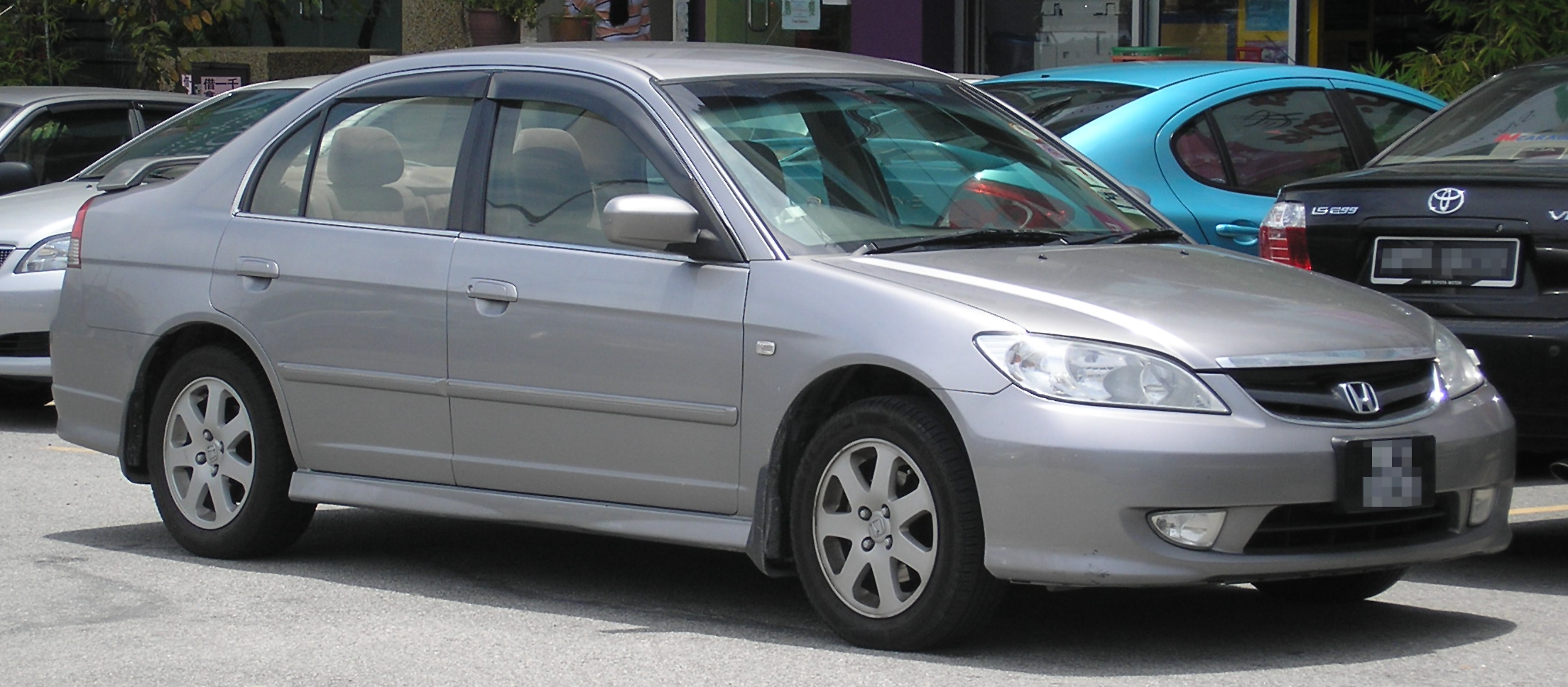

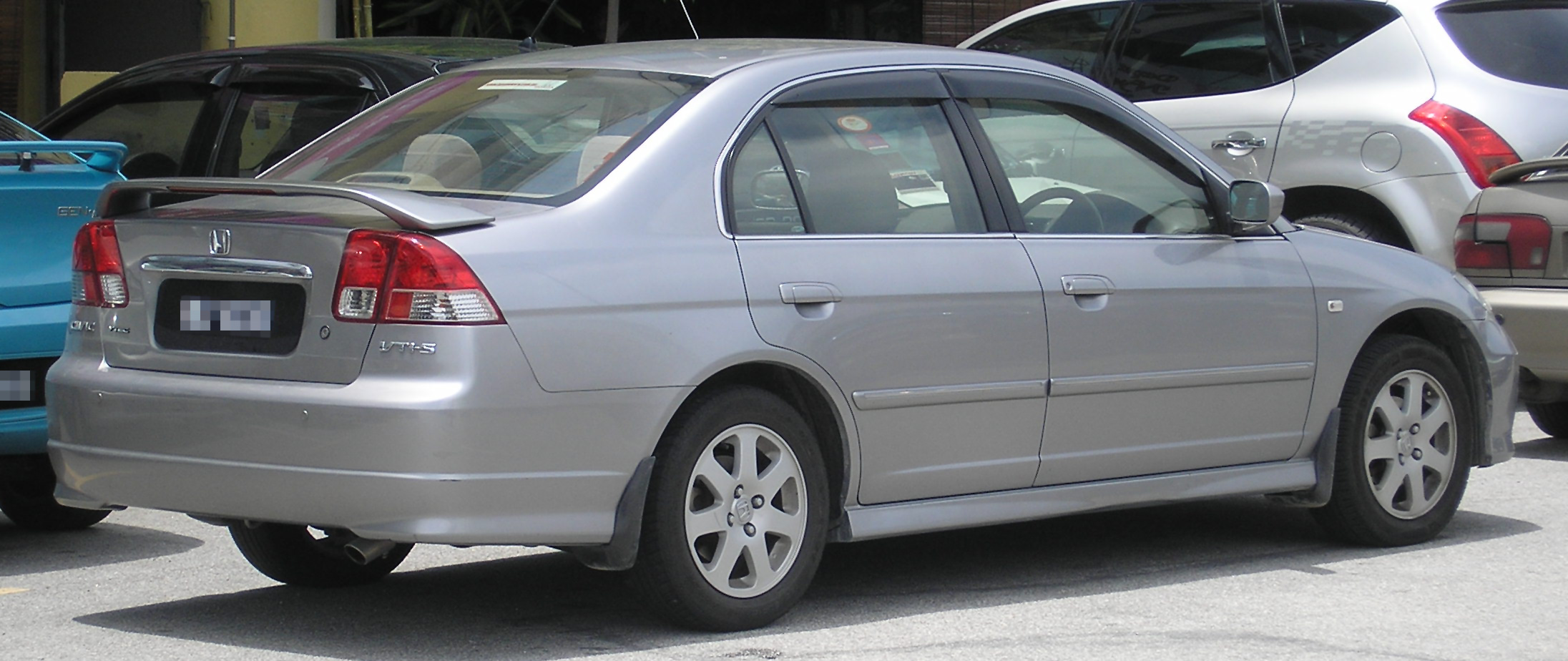
Civic VTi-S sedan (Malaysia; facelift)

The seventh-generation Civic was introduced in Malaysia in February 2001 where it was only available with the sedan body style powered by a 1.7-litre engine with two variants: EX-i and VTi. In November 2001, a third variant known as VTi (SRS) was introduced. This variant came with dual front airbags. In August 2003, the Civic was updated in Malaysia. The Civic was now only available with a 1.7-liter VTi-S variant. In May 2004, alongside the introduction of a 2.0L i-VTEC variant, a 1.7-liter VTEC variant unofficially replaced the 1.7-liter VTi-S variant. Two limited-edition seventh-generation Honda Civics were produced; once in April 2003 with 60 units known as the Civic RX and in January 2005 with 150 units known as the Civic RX2.

=== Philippines ===
In 2001, HCPI launched the new 7th Generation Honda Civic, available only as a sedan. Initial trim levels were 1.5 LXI (MT/AT), 1.6 VTi (MT/AT), 1.6 VTi-S (AT only). All trim levels came standard with all power features, while VTi-S came with dual airbags, ABS, Pretensioner Seatbelts, as well as a 4 Speaker Kenwood Audio System. In 2003, Honda updates the Civic to feature a new front fascia and taillights, while retaining most of its features from its initial launch in 2001. In 2004, Honda gives the Civic one final update, dropping the 1.5 LXI and giving it a whole new front fascia design. Trim levels from 2004 were 1.6 VTI (MT/AT), 1.6 VTI-S (MT/AT) and 2.0 i-VTEC (AT only). Paired to the 2.0 AT was a 5 Speed Automatic while the rest receive a 4 Speed Automatic. The 1.6 VTI–due to being the base model–misses out on the Dual SRS Airbags, ABS, front foglamps, and rear solid disc brakes.

=== Europe ===
TYPE-S Europe

5-door K20A3 Civic hatchbacks under the name Civic Type-S were sold in some parts of Europe (Not to be confused with the eighth-generation EU Type-S with the R18 engine) with a 2.0 badge in the front grille and Sport in Germany (model code EV1). This Type-S trim of the seventh-generation Civic was the rarest.

== Engines ==
Most DX and LX models were built with the D17A1, the HX had the D17A6 and the EX (US only) was powered by the D17A2. The Si/SiR (EP3) USDM had the K20A3. The JDM 5-door hatchback (EU) had the D15B. The GX runs on CNG.

The Philippine and Middle East version of the seventh-generation Civic used the 3-stage VTEC mechanism for their VTi/VTi-S/RS and the Pakistan version VTi Civic, equipped with a D16W9 rated at 130 hp (97 kW) at 6600 rpm. There was another seventh-generation Civic in Pakistan, which is known as EXi, the non-VTEC variant equipped with a D15Y3 capable of producing 115 to 117 HP (86 to 87 KW) at 6200 RPM.

The Japanese RS model was equipped with the D17A. Thai models received the 1.7-liter stroked engine in regular models, with the 2.0 i-VTEC available as the top model.

In Europe, the Civic was sold with a D16V1 rated at 110 hp and a D14Z6 rated at 88 hp. It was also Honda's first diesel offering, equipped with Isuzu's 1.7-litre 4EE2 engine (called the Circle L by GM) with 100 PS (74 kW). The European Type R Civic was equipped with a K20A2.

In North America, a 115 hp (86 kW) engine powered all Civics except the Hybrid, EX, and Si models, up 9 hp (7 kW) from the previous model. Power in the EX remained at 127 hp (95 kW), and all engines except for the Si were stroked to 1.7 liters. The seventh-generation North American Civic DX/LX/Value Package (VP) engines were the last Hondas not to use the company's variable valve time system (VTEC); the second to last was the 1996-2004 Acura 3.5RL.

== Hybrid ==
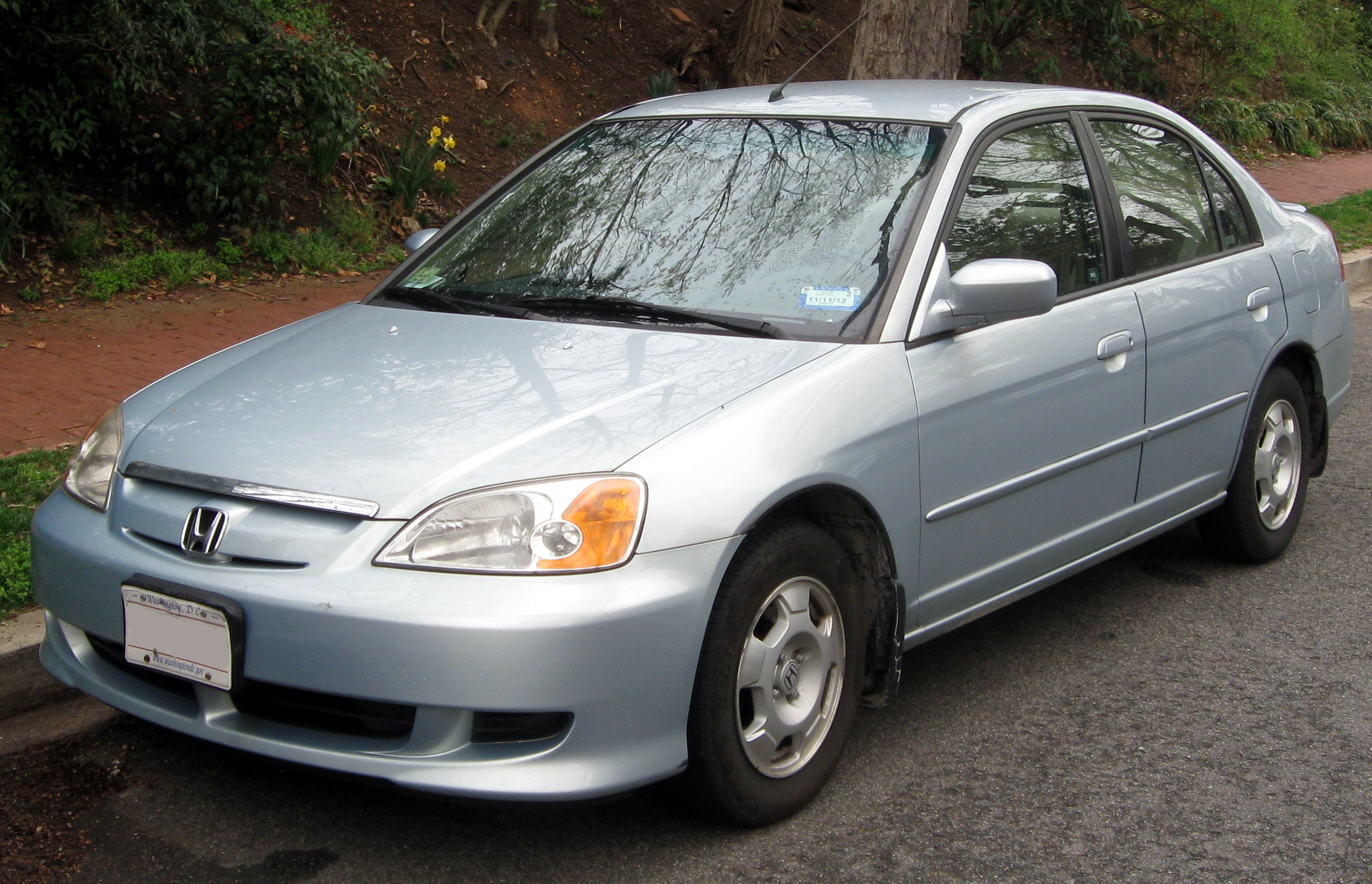
2003 Civic Hybrid

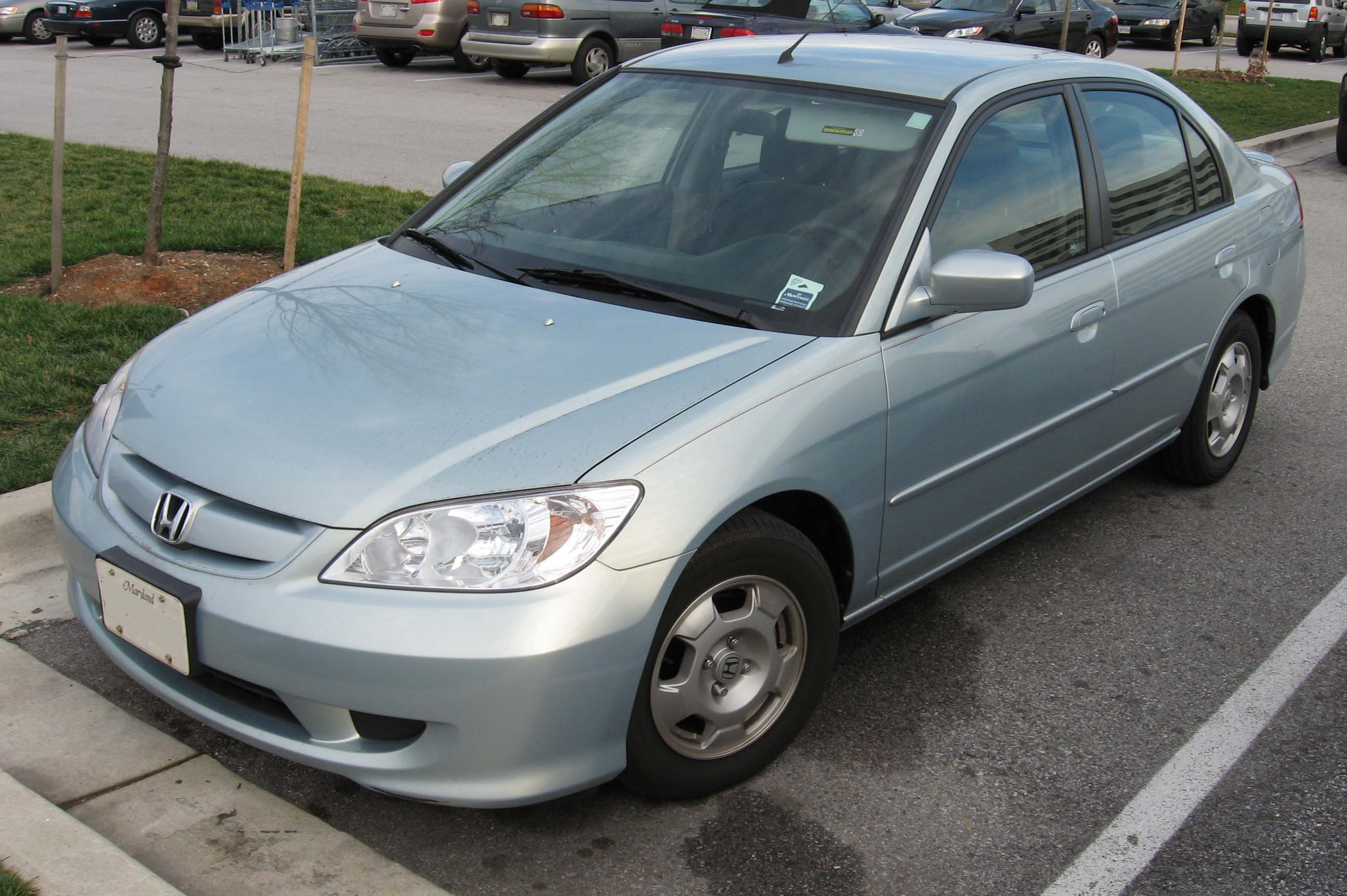
2004-05 Civic Hybrid

The hybrid version was first introduced to the Japanese market in December 2001. Honda claimed it was the most fuel-efficient 5-passenger gasoline-powered production vehicle in the world at the time. It was introduced to the U.S. in spring 2002 as a 2003 model. It is the first hybrid vehicle to be certified as an Advanced Technology Partial Zero- Emissions Vehicle (AT-PZEV) from CARB.

=== Design ===
The first-generation Civic Hybrid was based on the seventh-generation Civic sedan. It was the first mainstream vehicle from Honda equipped with a gasoline-electric hybrid system and became the second hybrid model of the company after Insight. Model with manual transmission was rated city 46 mpg_{‑US} (5.1 L/100 km; 55 mpg_{‑imp}) / highway 51 mpg_{‑US} (4.6 L/100 km; 61 mpg_{‑imp}) according to United States Environmental Protection Agency (EPA) fuel mileage estimates, about the same combined mileage as for the Toyota Prius, and became the most fuel-efficient five-passenger sedan ever sold in North America at the time.

The following is a list of its technical features:

- Twin spark plugs light the lean fuel-air mixtures sent to the two-valve combustion chambers.
- 1.3-litre single overhead cam i-DSI lean-burn internal combustion engine with VTEC Cylinder Cut-off System, which allows three cylinders to deactivate during deceleration. The engine generates 85 hp (63 kW) at 5,700 rpm and 87 lb⋅ft (118 N⋅m) of torque at 3,300 rpm.
- Idle stop - when stopped at a traffic light, the engine shuts off automatically, then restarts immediately when the driver takes their foot off the brake, contributing to both greater fuel efficiency and lower emissions.
- 10 kW (13 hp) brushless, permanent magnet assist motor, which functions as a generator during deceleration recharging the battery (regenerative braking).
- Combined output of both engine and electric motor is 93 hp (69 kW) at 5,700 rpm. Maximum torque is rated 116 lb⋅ft (157 N⋅m) at 1,500 rpm for manual transmission models and 105 lb⋅ft (142 N⋅m) at 3,000 rpm for CVT models.
- 144 V Nickel-metal hydride batteries with 6.0 Ah capacity.
- Honda Multimatic S continuously variable transmission or 5-speed manual transmission.
- ULEV or AT-PZEV certification by the California Air Resources Board (CARB).
- Low rolling resistance tires (P185/70R14) on aluminum wheels and regenerative braking.
- Electric power-steering.

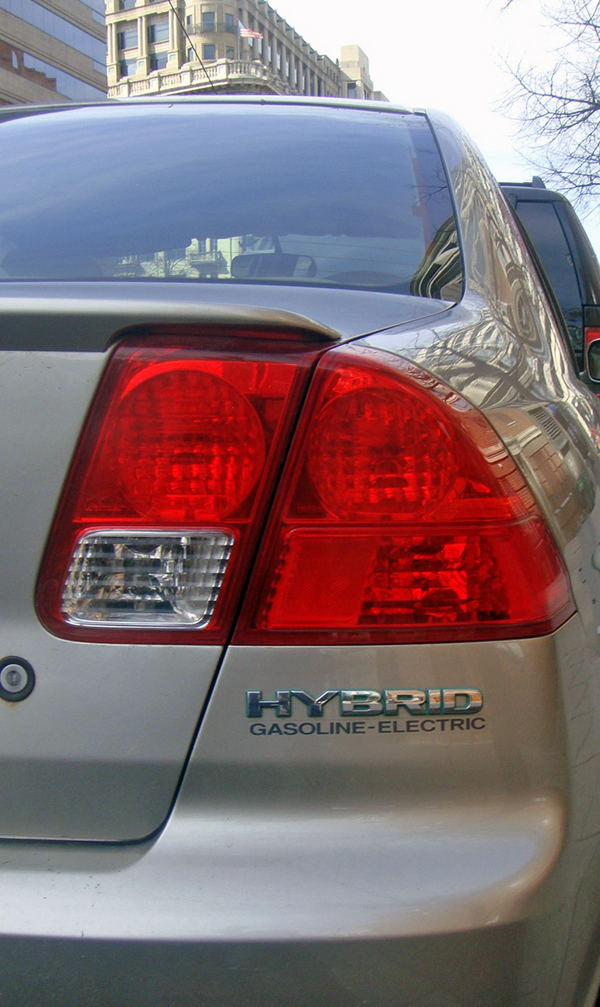
Hybrid badging used in the 2001–2005 generation

An electric motor is sandwiched between the gasoline engine and the transmission, providing up to 13 horsepower and creating a parallel hybrid drivetrain. The motor also acts as a generator, to recharge the car's nickel-metal hydride battery located between the rear seat and the trunk, and as a starter motor.

The motor in Civic Hybrid is about a quarter-inch (6.4 mm) thicker than that of the Insight. Through improvements to the magnetic coils of the DC brushless motor, it achieves 30% greater assisting and regenerative torque than the previous model without increasing the size.

It generates more torque (46 versus 36 lb⋅ft) than the motor in the Insight. The electricity is stored in a battery consisting of 120 1.2-volt Ni-MH D-cells wired in series. The battery can charge and discharge more rapidly and efficiently, though the total capacity is reduced from the Insight's (6.0 versus 6.5 Ah). The efficiency of the battery modules is increased, through a reduction in energy losses. The battery is housed with the electrical controller in a package called the Intelligent Power Unit (IPU). The new packaging reduces the size of the system by 50% and allows the IMA equipment to be placed behind the rear seat in the trunk. The unit weighs only 63 lb (29 kg) and is one-third smaller than that of the Insight.

The two spark plugs in each cylinder can fire either sequentially or simultaneously, enabling more efficient burning during lean-burn mode and more often lean-burn operation. The engine can operate at a lean 22:1 air-to-fuel ratio more than 60% of the time on a flat road. The VTEC cylinder idling system of the engine closes the valves in three of the four cylinders when the car is decelerating, reduces the power lost to the engine by 50%, and allows the IMA to extract more electrical energy during braking. The rocker arms operating the intake and exhaust valves have two modes: valve-lift mode or idle mode. They are engaged via a synchronizing piston. During deceleration, the synchro piston disengages the lift-mode rocker arm so that the valves remain at rest, effectively sealing off the cylinder.

An idle-stop feature shuts off the engine automatically when stopped, then restarts immediately when the driver removes their foot from the brake. This auto idle-stop system contributes to both greater fuel efficiency and lower emissions. During stop and go driving, the engine will turn off when the car comes to a stop for the first time, however, if the car does not go above 10 mph (16 km/h) and stops again, the engine will not turn off unless the car is stopped for more than 15 seconds.

With assistance from the electric motor, the combined torque at below 3,700 rpm is greater than that available from the non-hybrid Civic's 1.7-liter engine.

Fuel efficiency is further improved by 6% by utilizing a new front air dam and rear spoiler, along with revised underbody panels, reducing the drag coefficient from 0.30 to 0.28; replacing traditional power steering with electrical power result as reduction in parasitic losses and special lower rolling resistance tires. The Dunlop tires improve ride quality and reduce road noise compared with other hybrids like Insight and Prius. When compared with Insight, a wider tire improves stability at highway speed. Car and Driver reported that the car can accelerate 0–60 mph (0–97 km/h) in 10.9 seconds.

=== Fuel economy ===
The Civic Hybrid is estimated to be 40% more fuel-efficient than its non-hybrid counterpart.

=== Award and recognition ===
- The Civic Hybrid's engine won the International Engine of the Year "1 litre to 1.4 litre" size category award for three years straight from 2002 through 2004 as well as the "Best Fuel Economy" category for 2003 and 2004.
- 2003 recognized by the American Council for an Energy Efficient Economy amongst the top ten Greenest Vehicles: tied for the third-best score with Toyota Prius

=== Minor design changes ===
There was a minor refresh of the design between the 2003 and 2004 model years which affected the front and rear bumper covers, hood, and headlights. On the interior, a small center console replaced the driver's armrest and the rear seats got adjustable headrests.

== U.S. sales ==
In 2004, Honda Civic was the seventh best selling vehicle overall and third best selling passenger car in the U.S.

== Awards and recognitions ==
- 2001 – recognized by the American Council for an Energy Efficient Economy: the natural gas powered Civic GX tied for the top spot with Honda's hybrid vehicle Insight; the Civic HX took the best vehicle in class award
- 2002 – recognized by the American Council for an Energy Efficient Economy amongst the top ten Greenest Vehicles: the natural gas powered Civic GX tied for the second best score with an electric vehicle; the Civic HX coupe took the fourth place and the rest Civic models took the seventh place
- 2003 – Consumer Reports gave the Civic EX sedan a Recommended
