= CADR =

CADR may refer to:

- CAR and CDR, a programming language construct used in Common Lisp or Scheme
- CADR, the name of a computing system developed at M.I.T.; see Lisp machine
- Clean Air Delivery Rate, a rating system developed for portable room air cleaners
- Continuous Adiabatic Demagnetisation Refrigeration, a multi-stage magnetic refrigeration system
- Center for Alternative Dispute Resolution, an institution that provides training and accreditation
