= Aham =

Aham may refer to:

== People ==
- Aham Okeke (born 1969), Nigerian-born Norwegian sprinter
- Aham Sharma, Indian film and television actor

== Places ==
- Aham, Germany, municipality in Bavaria

== Other ==
- Aham (Kashmir Shaivism)
- Aham (film)
- Association of Home Appliance Manufacturers
