= EPS Service Parts Act of 2014 =

- Long title: To amend the Energy Policy and Conservation Act to permit exemptions for external power supplies from certain efficiency standards, and for other purposes.
- Announced in: the 113th United States Congress
- Sponsored by: Rep. Cory Gardner (R, CO-4)
- Number of co-sponsors: 1

Codification
- U.S.C. sections affected: 42 U.S.C. § 6295
- Agencies affected: United States Department of Energy

Legislative history
- Introduced in the House as H.R. 5057 by Rep. Cory Gardner (R, CO-4) on July 10, 2014; Committee consideration by United States House Committee on Energy and Commerce, United States House Energy Subcommittee on Energy and Power

The EPS Service Parts Act of 2014 (H.R. 5057) is a bill that would exempt certain external power supplies from complying with standards set forth in a final rule published by the United States Department of Energy in February 2014. The United States House Committee on Energy and Commerce describes the bill as a bill that "provides regulatory relief by making a simple technical correction to the 2007 Energy Independence and Security Act to exempt certain power supply (EPS) service and spare parts from federal efficiency standards."

The bill was introduced into the United States House of Representatives during the 113th United States Congress.

== Background ==
The Energy Independence and Security Act of 2007 (Pub.L. 110-140 originally named the "Clean Energy Act of 2007") is an Act of Congress concerning the energy policy of the United States. As part of the Democratic Party's 100-Hour Plan during the 110th Congress, it was introduced in the United States House of Representatives by Representative Nick Rahall of West Virginia, along with 198 cosponsors. A revised bill passed both houses on December 18, 2007 and President Bush, a Republican, signed it into law on December 19, 2007, in response to his "Twenty in Ten" challenge to reduce gasoline consumption by 20% in 10 years.

The stated purpose of the act is “to move the United States toward greater energy independence and security, to increase the production of clean renewable fuels, to protect consumers, to increase the efficiency of products, buildings, and vehicles, to promote research on and deploy greenhouse gas capture and storage options, and to improve the energy performance of the Federal Government, and for other purposes.”.

== Congressional Budget Office report ==
This summary is based largely on the summary provided by the Congressional Budget Office, as ordered reported by the House Committee on Energy and Commerce on July 15, 2014. This is a public domain source.

The United States Department of Energy (DOE) prescribes energy conservation standards for more than 50 categories of appliances and equipment. H.R. 5057 would exempt certain external power supplies from complying with standards set forth in a final rule published in February 2014. (An external power supply is a hardware component that converts household electric current into lower-voltage current used to operate devices such as laptops and smartphones.) The bill would authorize DOE to limit the applicability of that exemption if the Secretary finds that the exemption would result in a significant reduction in energy savings that would otherwise result if the February 2014 rule were fully implemented.

The Congressional Budget Office (CBO) estimates that enacting H.R. 5057 would not significantly affect the federal budget. Based on information from DOE, we estimate that any costs incurred by the agency to carry out the bill's provisions would total less than $500,000 annually and would be subject to the availability of appropriated funds. H.R. 5057 would not affect direct spending or revenues; therefore, pay-as-you-go procedures do not apply.

H.R. 5057 contains no intergovernmental or private-sector mandates as defined in the Unfunded Mandates Reform Act and would not affect the budgets of state, local, or tribal governments.

== Procedural history ==
The EPS Service Parts Act of 2014 is a bill that was introduced into the United States House of Representatives on July 10, 2014, by Rep. Cory Gardner (R, CO-4). The bill was referred to the United States House Committee on Energy and Commerce and the United States House Energy Subcommittee on Energy and Power. The committee voted in favor of the bill on July 15, 2014, in a unanimous vote.

== Debate and discussion ==
The bill had the support of the Alliance to Save Energy (ASE), the American Council for an Energy-Efficient Economy (ACEEE), the Association of Home Appliance Manufacturers (AHAM), the Consumer Electronics Association (CEA), the National Association of Manufacturers (NAM), the National Electrical Manufacturers Association (NEMA), and the Natural Resources Defense Council (NRDC).

According to supporters of the bill, "without this change in law, manufacturers would be required to redesign and qualify new service and spare EPS for existing products that are no longer in production at significant expense for both the companies and consumers." The Energy Independence and Security Act of 2007 did originally include an exemption for such devices through 2015, but manufactures and others are finding that a deadline of 2015 is too soon because consumers are still using the older devices even if they are no longer being produced.

== See also ==
- List of bills in the 113th United States Congress
- Energy policy of the United States
