= John A. Laitner =

American economist

John A. "Skip" Laitner (born August 23, 1947) is an American-born economist, author and lecturer. He focuses on developing a more robust technology and behavioral characterization of energy efficiency resources for use in energy and climate economic policy models.

Laitner leads a team of consultants, the Economic and Human Dimensions Research Associates based in Tucson, Arizona. He is the past president of the Association of Environmental Studies and Sciences (AESS), an independent interdisciplinary professional association in higher education. He is also a senior economic research fellow for the Russian Presidential Academy of National Economy and Public Administration (RANEPA).

Laitner is the former Director of Economic and Social Analysis for the American Council for an Energy-Efficient Economy (ACEEE). He previously served almost 10 years as a senior economist for Technology Policy for the US Environmental Protection Agency (EPA). He left the federal service in June 2006 to focus his research on developing a more robust technology and behavioral characterization of energy efficiency resources for use in energy and climate policy analyses and within economic policy models. He also provides technical support for a variety of local governments in the development of energy and climate profiles, especially as they positively shape and enhance long-term Sustainable Development Goals.

Laitner is the author of more than 320 book chapters, journal articles, and reports about environmental, energy, and economic policy. His expertise includes benefit-cost assessments, behavioral assessments, resource costs and constraints, and the net employment and macroeconomic impacts of energy and climate policy scenarios. His research, building on the work of Robert U. Ayres and Benjamin Warr, examines links between energy efficiency and economic productivity. In a new book chapter, Laitner provides a time series dataset that suggests the United States may be only 14 percent energy efficient, a level of inefficiency which could constrain the development of a more robust economy.

== Career ==
2012 to Present: Founder of Economic and Human Dimensions Research Associates, based in Tucson, Arizona, where he leads a team of consultants.

2006 to 2012: Director of Economic and Social Analysis for ACEEE. In that capacity, he was responsible for a range of benefit-cost assessments of energy policies as they affect both climate and energy policies and the macroeconomy, including energy prices, net employment, and gross domestic product (GDP) impacts.

1997 to 2006: Senior Economist for Technology Policy within U.S. Environmental Protection Agency’s Office of Atmospheric Programs. Laitner was responsible for analysis and development of policy options for a variety of energy, climate change, and air pollution problems. This focused on the analysis and assessment of climate change policy options designed to provide further understanding of the macroeconomic benefits of energy efficiency and renewable energy at the national and regional level through the better linking of technology costing models and macroeconomic or general equilibrium models.

1985 to 1998: Founder and principal of the consulting group, Economic Research Associates. Clients included a variety of municipalities and state government agencies.

1993 to 1995: Senior Economist and Program Manager for Energy Efficiency and Economic Development, a program initiated by ACEEE. The program focused on the macroeconomic and employment impacts of energy efficiency initiatives.

1983 to 1986: Chief of the Research Division for the Nebraska Energy Office.

1977 to 1983: Co-founder of the Community Action Research Group, an economic and legislative consulting firm based in Ames, Iowa, serving as both the Executive Director and the Director of Research.

== Awards and recognition ==
Citation of Excellence: The 1997 paper co-authored with Dr. Stephen DeCanio, "Modeling technological change in energy demand forecasting: a generalized approach", in Technological Forecasting & Social Change, Vol. 55, No. 3, received the ANBAR Electronic Intelligence Citation of Excellence, Highest Quality Rating.

U.S. EPA Gold Medal Award: The U.S. EPA's highest honor for working with a team of economists that completed "complex and rigorous analysis of greenhouse gas mitigation options, leading to President Clinton's announcement of an aggressive climate change policy." March 1998.

Combined Heat and Power (CHP) Champion: For policy and analytical work in support of development of combined heat and power (CHP) technologies over the last five years, the US Combined Heat and Power Association gave Laitner an award to acknowledge his contributions to the industry. September 2003.

== Selected publications ==
- "Shifting Demand: From the Economic Imperative of Energy Efficiency to Business Models that Engage and Empower Consumers," by John A. "Skip" Laitner, Matthew T. McDonnell and Heidi M. Keller, in End of Electricity Demand Growth: How Energy Efficiently Can Bring an End to the Need for More Power Plants, Fereidoon P. Sioshansi (editor), Elsevier, 2013.
- "The Link Between Energy Efficiency, Useful Work, and a Robust Economy," by John A. "Skip" Laitner, in John Byrne and Yang-doo Wang (editors), Secure and Green Energy Economies, Rutgers University Transaction Publishers, 2013.
- "Beyond the Meter: Enabling Better Home Energy Management," by Karen Ehrhardt- Martinez, John A. "Skip" Laitner, and Kat A. Donnelly, in Energy, Sustainability and the Environment: Technology, Incentives, Behavior, Fereidoon P. Sioshansi (editor), Burlington, MA: Butterworth-Heinemann (Elsevier), 2011.
- "Semiconductors and Information Technologies: The Power of Productivity," by John A. "Skip" Laitner, Journal of Industrial Ecology, Volume 14, Number 5, pages 692–695, October 2010.
- "Semiconductor Technologies: The Potential to Revolutionize U.S. Energy Productivity (Part II)," by John A. "Skip" Laitner, Chris Poland Knight, Vanessa L. McKinney, and Karen Ehrhardt-Martinez, Environmental Quality Management, Spring 2010.
- "Semiconductor Technologies: The Potential to Revolutionize U.S. Energy Productivity (Part III)," by John A. "Skip" Laitner, Chris Poland Knight, Vanessa L. McKinney, and Karen Ehrhardt-Martinez, Environmental Quality Management, Summer 2010.
- People-Centered Initiatives for Increasing Energy Savings , Karen Ehrhardt-Martinez and John A. "Skip" Laitner, Editors, Washington, DC: American Council for an Energy- Efficient Economy, 2010.
- "Rebound, Technology and People: Mitigating the Rebound Effect with Energy-Resource Management and People-Centered Initiatives," Karen Ehrhardt-Martinez and John A. "Skip" Laitner, in People-Centered Initiatives for Increasing Energy Savings, Karen Ehrhardt-Martinez and John A. "Skip" Laitner, editors, Washington, DC: American Council for an Energy-Efficient Economy. 2010.
- "The Energy Efficiency Behavior Continuum," by John A. "Skip" Laitner and Karen Ehrhardt-Martinez, in People-Centered Initiatives for Increasing Energy Savings, Karen Ehrhardt-Martinez and John A. "Skip" Laitner, editors, Karen Ehrhardt-Martinez, editor, Washington, DC: American Council for an Energy-Efficient Economy, 2010.

== Selected reports and papers ==
- The Long-Term Energy Efficiency Potential: What the Evidence Suggests, by John A. "Skip" Laitner, Steven Nadel, Harvey Sachs, R. Neal Elliott, Siddiq Khan, ACEEE Research Report E104, Washington, DC: American Council for an Energy-Efficient Economy. 2012.
- The Economy-Wide Impact of Feedback-Induced Behaviors that Drive Residential Electricity Saving, by John A. "Skip" Laitner, Washington, DC: American Council for an Energy-Efficient Economy. 2012.
- Consumer Engagement Programs as a Smart Energy Efficiency Strategy for Our Nation’s Electric Utilities, by John A. "Skip" Laitner and Matthew T. McDonnell, Garrison, NY: Garrison Institute. 2012.
- Securing Nebraska’s Energy and Economic Future: Creating Jobs, New Economic Opportunities and Health Benefits through Productive Investments in Wind Energy and Energy Efficiency, by John A. "Skip" Laitner and Matthew T. McDonnell, Madison, WI: Sierra Club. 2012.
- Measuring the Energy Reduction Impact of Selected Broadband-Enabled Activities within Households , by John A. "Skip" Laitner, Brian Partridge, and Vincent Vittore, Brussels, Belgium: Global e-Sustainability Initiative. 2012.
- Energy Efficiency: Productivity Benefits to Power Colorado Jobs and the Economy, by John A. "Skip" Laitner, Carbondale, CO: Clean Energy Economy for the Region. 2012.
- Impacts of Energy Efficiency Provisions in Pending Senate Energy Efficiency Bills, by Kate Farley, Catherine (Casey) Bell, R. Neal Elliot, John A. "Skip" Laitner, and Steven Nadel, ACEEE White Paper, Washington, DC: American Council for an Energy-Efficient Economy. 2012.
- Energy Productivity: Efficiency Benefits to Power Ohio Jobs and the Economy, by John A. "Skip" Laitner, Dylan Sullivan, and Nolan Moser, An Issue Brief, Washington, DC: Natural Resources Defense Council. 2012.
