= Association of Home Appliance Manufacturers =

American manufacturer organization

- Abbreviation: AHAM
- Formation: 1967
- Type: Trade association / Standards organization
- Legal status: Non-profit
- Headquarters: Washington, D.C., United States
- Region served: United States and Canada
- Members: Major, portable, and floor care appliance manufacturers and suppliers
- President & CEO: Kelly Mariotti
- Subsidiaries: AHAM Canada
- Website: www.aham.org

The Association of Home Appliance Manufacturers or AHAM represents the manufacturers of household appliances and products/services associated with household appliances sold in the United States. AHAM also develops and maintains technical standards for various appliances to provide uniform, repeatable procedures for measuring specific product characteristics and performance features.

AHAM is an ANSI accredited Standards Development Organization, and maintains several standards which are approved by ANSI through the consensus approval process. AHAM standards are also recognized by many regulatory agencies including the United States Environmental Protection Agency and the U.S. Department of Energy.

The Clean Air Delivery Rate seal issued by AHAM.

In addition to publishing standards, AHAM also provides regular information and advocacy to members before other standards development organizations such as Underwriters Laboratories, the Canadian Standards Association, ASTM, IEC and ISO.

AHAM administers voluntary certification programs to rate appliances developed by members and non-members. Testing is conducted by third-party laboratories and, upon certification, appliances may carry the AHAM seal.

== Legislation ==
AHAM supported the EPS Service Parts Act of 2014 (H.R. 5057; 113th Congress), a bill that would exempt certain external power supplies from complying with standards set forth in a final rule published by the United States Department of Energy in February 2014. The United States House Committee on Energy and Commerce describes the bill as a bill that "provides regulatory relief by making a simple technical correction to the 2007 Energy Independence and Security Act to exempt certain power supply (EPS) service and spare parts from federal efficiency standards."

In July 2024, AHAM signed a letter to members of both the House Committee on Armed Services and the Senate Committee on Armed Services opposing Section 828 of S. 4628, the National Defense Authorization Act for Fiscal Year 2025, entitled "Requirement for Contractors to Provide Reasonable Access to Repair Materials," which would require contractors doing business with the US military to agree "to provide the Department of Defense fair and reasonable access to all the repair materials, including parts, tools, and information, used by the manufacturer or provider or their authorized partners to diagnose, maintain, or repair the good or service."
