= American Council for an Energy-Efficient Economy =

US non-profit organisation

Founded	1980
Chair	Penni McLean-Conner
Exec. Director	Jennifer Layke
Headquarters	Washington, DC, US
Slogan	"Make Energy Go Further"
Website	www.aceee.org

The American Council for an Energy-Efficient Economy (ACEEE) is a nonprofit, 501(c)(3) organization. Founded in 1980, ACEEE's mission is to act as a catalyst to advance energy efficiency policies, programs, technologies, investments, and behaviors in order to help achieve greater economic prosperity, and environmental protection.

ACEEE promotes energy efficiency by conducting technical and policy analyses; advising policymakers and program managers; and working collaboratively with businesses, government officials, public interest groups, and other organizations. It convenes conferences and workshops, primarily for energy efficiency professionals, and produces reports, conference proceedings, and media outreach.

ACEEE employs more than 60 people, in its Washington, D.C. office or remotely. The organization's primary focuses are on end-use efficiency in industry, buildings, utilities, and transportation; economic analysis and human behavior; and local, state, and national policy.

== Federal and state energy policy ==
=== Federal ===
ACEEE has worked on federal energy policy since the 1980s. The organization played central roles in the development of the National Appliance Energy Conservation Act of 1987, energy efficiency provisions in the Energy Policy Act of 1992 and the Energy Policy Act of 2005, the Energy Independence and Security Act of 2007, and the Energy Act of 2020. Many of these provisions were developed in cooperation with interested business and received bipartisan support.

ACEEE staff testify before Congress and work closely with Congressional staff in both major parties to help shape new initiatives and analyze the impacts of energy and climate policy proposals. They weigh in on the federal budget process, promoting and increasing funding for what they deem the most effective energy efficiency programs.

The organization also works with federal agencies such as the Environmental Protection Agency and the Department of Energy on programs and policies, and participates in formal rulemakings on energy efficiency issues. Most of ACEEE's federal policy work involves research and education; however, they do a limited amount of lobbying using unrestricted funds.

They supported the EPS Service Parts Act of 2014 (H.R. 5057; 113th Congress), a bill that would exempt certain external power supplies from complying with standards set forth in a final rule published by the United States Department of Energy in February 2014. The United States House Committee on Energy and Commerce describes the bill as one that "provides regulatory relief by making a simple technical correction to the 2007 Energy Independence and Security Act to exempt certain power supply (EPS) service and spare parts from federal efficiency standards."

=== State ===
At the state level, ACEEE works closely with public officials and local energy efficiency advocates, providing advice, analysis, and technical support. In order to maximize its impact, the organization concentrates its efforts on large states that are poised to make major decisions on energy efficiency policy issues. For example, in 2007 and 2008, it emphasized work in Florida, Maryland, Michigan, Ohio, Pennsylvania, Texas, and Virginia. All of these states passed significant energy efficiency legislation, with additional legislation and regulations likely in some of them.

ACEEE also works on state policies that can potentially be adopted at the national level. For example, staff have worked with several states to develop state appliance and equipment efficiency standards, which have subsequently been adopted by Congress.

== Research and analysis ==
ACEEE devotes much of its resources to research and analysis in order to discern the best technical, program, and policy practices that promote efficient energy use, and to define the magnitude of benefits of energy efficiency. Research staff survey market trends and activities, analyze technical and economic potential for energy efficiency, seek to understand consumer energy decisions, and assess the potential for regulations, policies, and programs to achieve energy savings. ACEEE's research programs include:

- Behavior and human dimensions – Researches ways individuals can change their behavior to save energy and ways these behaviors can be encouraged and amplified.
- Buildings – ACEEE's oldest research program analyzes opportunities for energy efficiency in appliances and equipment; building design, construction, and operation; and programs and policies that encourage consumers to make energy-efficient product choices.
- Health and environment – Provides information about the health benefits of energy efficiency to the public, energy and health policymakers, and advocates.
- Utilities – Serves as the principal documenter and reviewer of publicly funded energy efficiency programs and supporting policies, preparing regular surveys of best practices and supporting implementers and regulators in designing the next generation of programs and policies.
- Transportation – Tracks vehicle technology and estimates the potential for future energy efficiency. In addition, the program explores technologies and policies that encourage changes in personal and freight transportation markets to further reduce energy use.
- Industry – Applies unique experience in energy efficiency for the manufacturing sector (including distributed energy resources such as combined heat and power), and assesses technologies, practices, programs, and policies to achieve increased energy efficiency in manufacturing.
- Economic analysis – Encourages the use of sound economic modeling practices, studies the impacts of energy policies on the economy, and projects the economic benefits of energy efficiency technologies, practices, and policies.
- Local policy – Promotes energy efficiency at the local level and provides key resources to support local policymakers, program implementers, and efficiency advocates.
- State policy – Cross-program effort that combines expertise from other research programs to assess state energy policies, analyze the potential for energy efficiency at the state level, and collect key resources to support state policymakers, program implementers, and efficiency advocates.
- Federal policy – Develops policy recommendations and documents how efficiency measures can reduce energy use, air pollution, and greenhouse gas emissions while benefiting the economy.
- International – Works with colleagues from transitional economies to adapt technology, program, and policy experiences from the United States to these economies.

== Outreach ==
ACEEE attempts to reach out to and inform diverse audiences in a variety of ways:

=== Conferences ===
ACEEE holds several conferences each year that aim to bring together disparate stakeholders to focus on multiple aspects of energy efficiency and the role it plays in addressing critical issues such as climate change, energy resources, utility structure and regulation, and energy use in buildings, industry, and agriculture. Recurring conferences include:

- Summer Study on Energy Efficiency in Industry
- Summer Study on Energy Efficiency in Buildings
- Hot Water Forum
- Energy Efficiency Finance Forum
- Behavior, Energy, and Climate Change Conference (BECC)
- National Conference on Energy Efficiency as a Resource

=== Publications ===
ACEEE provides research and technical analysis of current energy efficiency policies and practices, as well as forecasting future trends. These publications include research reports, white papers, legislative testimony, and conference proceedings. Major recent ACEEE reports include:

- The 2020 State Energy Efficiency Scorecard
- The 2020 City Clean Energy Scorecard
- The ACEEE State Transportation Electrification Scorecard
- How High Are Household Energy Burdens? An Assessment of National and Metropolitan Energy Burdens across the U.S.

=== Web resources ===
ACEEE shares its work online by providing publications and conference presentations on the internet. While not a consumer-focused organization, ACEEE has several web resources devoted to educating consumers about making wise energy efficiency choices relating to their homes and their vehicles, through:

- SmarterHouse.org
- GreenerCars.org (Online presence of ACEEE's Green Book: The Environmental Guide to Cars and Trucks)

=== Ally program ===
ACEEE convenes primary stakeholders in discussions and networking opportunities through policy briefings, webinars covering recent published research and analysis, and one-to-one interaction with staff and Board members

== Funding ==
ACEEE's sources of funding in 2019 were broken down as follows:

- Foundations (66.64%)
- Corporations (11.15%)
- Nonprofits (11.49%)
- Public Agencies (9.87%)
- Individuals (≈1%)

== See also ==
- Efficient energy use
- Energy policy of the United States
- Energy conservation in the United States
- John A. "Skip" Laitner
