= Clean air delivery rate =

Filtration efficacy measurement

The AHAM-certified seal lists a rating for tobacco smoke, pollen, and dust removal, and a rating for room size.

The clean air delivery rate (CADR) is a figure of merit that is the cubic feet per minute (CFM) of air that has had all the particles of a given size distribution removed. For air filters that have air flowing through them, it is the fraction of particles (of a particular size distribution) that have been removed from the air, multiplied by the air flow rate (in CFM) through the device. More precisely, it is the CFM of air in a 1,008-cubic-foot (28.5 m^{3}) room that has had all the particles of a given size distribution removed from the air, over and above the rate at which the particles are naturally falling out of the air. Different filters have different abilities to remove different particle distributions, so three CADR's for a given device are typically measured: smoke, pollen, and dust. By combining the amount of airflow and particle removal efficiency, consumers are less likely to be misled by a high efficiency filter that is filtering a small amount of air, or by a high volume of air that is not being filtered very well.

== Applicability ==
The CADR ratings were developed by the Association of Home Appliance Manufacturers (AHAM) and are measured according to a procedure specified by ANSI/AHAM AC-1. The ratings are recognized by retailers, manufacturers, standards organizations, and government bodies such as the EPA and the Federal Trade Commission. Whole house air cleaners are not covered by the CADR specification because the measurement is performed in a standard 1,008-cubic-foot (28.5 m^{3}) room, the size of a typical house room, which has different airflow patterns than whole-house filters. Measurements are made with the filter running and not running, so particles that naturally fall out of the air are not being counted as part of filter's operation. The measurement only applies to particulate matter, not to gases.

Any device or technology that removes particulate matter from the air can be tested for CADR numbers. Anyone with the necessary equipment can perform the ANSI/AHAM AC-1 measurements. The AHAM performs the tests for manufacturers who are paid members of AHAM which choose to use their service, allowing the manufacturer to display a seal that certifies AHAM performed the test.

The CADR numbers reflect particulate matter remaining in the air, which has not been captured by the filter or other technology. Some low-efficiency filters employ ionization, which attaches a weak electrostatic charge to particulate matter, which can cause several smaller particles to group together resulting in a lower particle measurement count. Ionization can also cause particulate matter to attach to surfaces such as walls, and flooring, resulting in lower particulate counts in the air, but without having particulate matter permanently removed from the air.

The rating is only valid for a given filter as used in a specific equipment design, and when the filter is brand new. The rating is based on a 20-minute test. Choosing a higher- or lower-efficiency filter than the unit was designed for may decrease its ability to filter air. An exception is when a high efficiency filter does not decrease the fan's airflow rate. This is usually achievable only with physically larger or thicker filters, which usually cannot be used in a unit designed for smaller filters. Filters with efficiencies higher than the original may slow the fan's airflow rate down, which may result in a lower CADR rating.

Due to the measurement process, the CADR rating is intended for use only with equipment designed for residential spaces. Clean rooms, hospitals, and airplanes use high-efficiency HEPA filters and do not use a CADR rating, but instead may use MERV ratings.

== Understanding the rating ==
The AHAM seal (usually found on the back of an air cleaner's box) lists three CADR numbers, one each for smoke, pollen, and dust. This order is from the smallest to largest particles and corresponds to the most dangerous to the least dangerous particles. The higher the CADR number, the more air it filters per minute for that particle size range. Consumers can use these ratings to compare air cleaners from the various manufacturers.

The defined particle size ranges are 0.09–1.0 μm for smoke, 0.5–3 μm for dust, and 5–11 μm for pollen.

AHAM recommends following their '2/3' rule. Air filters should be chosen for rooms so that the value of its smoke CADR is equal to or greater than 2/3 the room area in units of square feet (valid for rooms up to 8-foot (2.4 m) in height). This recommendation is based on the assumption that the room will have air exchanged with other rooms at a rate of less than 1 room volume per hour, and that the customer desires at least 80% of the smoke particles removed from the air. For an 8-foot (2.4 m) high room, this means the room volume should be less than or equal to 12 times the CADR value. Much larger rooms can be effectively filtered if there is no air coming from the outside, and if there is no significant continuing source of particulates in the room.

MERV 14 filters are capable of reducing smoke particles by approximately 80% when operating at the filter's design velocity, so a CADR smoke rating on a simple filtering unit that uses a MERV 14 filter will be approximately 0.80 times the fan flow rate in CFM. If the filtering unit does not mix the test room's air very well, it may receive a lower CADR measurement because it does not operate as efficiently as it should. If a filtering unit uses a MERV 12 filter that removes roughly 40% of the smoke particles, then it may still obtain a smoke CADR of 80 by filtering 200 cubic feet per minute instead of 100 CFM. Conversely, a 99.97% HEPA filter (MERV 17) that removes over 99.9% of the smoke particles needs to filter 80 cubic feet per minute to get a CADR of 80. This shows the CFM airflow of a unit is always equal to or greater than the CADR rating.

Large particles naturally fall out of the air faster than small particles, but the CADR rating is based on how well the filter works over and above this effect. So CADR ratings for dust and pollen come out lower than would be expected by looking only at the filter's efficiency at removing large particles. This "bias" against the filter's efficiency at removing large particles is a relative bias in favor of the filter's ability to remove small (smoke) articles. Since smoke particles are the most difficult to filter (lower filter efficiency relative to large particles), the two effects largely cancel so that CADR ratings are usually similar for both small and large particles. A filter that is very good at removing smoke particles by using a slow fan or electrostatic effects will not get as good CADR numbers for pollen and dust because those particles will fall down and deposit on room surfaces during the test, before the filter has had a chance to collect them.

For smoke-sized particles, a MERV 12 filter may function as well as a MERV 14 filter at half its rated air velocity (for smoke particles), and a MERV 14 may function like a MERV 12 at double its rated velocity. This is because smoke-sized particles depend on diffusion (Brownian motion) onto fibers as much as impaction, rather than completely on impaction like dust. A slower air speed gives diffusion more time for the particle to stick to the fiber or previously attached particles. Conversely, a higher filter speed may increase the collection of larger particles because impaction depends on the inertia of the particles. As a filter gets clogged from use, the fan air speed drops so that the effective CADR for smoke may actually rise rather than decrease, while the CADR for dust will be lower from the decrease in fan speed, especially because the particles fall out before they are filtered.

If half the room's volume of air is exchanged with other rooms every hour, then HEPA filters are not more effective than dust spot 85% efficiency filters (roughly, MERV 13 or 3M's MPR 1900). The unit's fan speed will be the dominant factor if air from outside the room is coming in too quickly.

== History ==
In the early 1980s, AHAM developed a method for measuring the clean air delivery rate for portable household electric room air cleaners. The resulting standard became an American National Standard in 1988 and was last revised in 2020. Known as ANSI/AHAM AC-1, it measures the air cleaner's ability to reduce tobacco smoke, dust and pollen particles in a room. It also includes a method for calculating the suggested room size.

== See also ==
- Association of Home Appliance Manufacturers
- Air purifier
- Air filter
- HEPA
- Air changes per hour
