= Peter Ekelund =

Swedish businessman and investor

- Born: Peter Erik Daniel Ekelund; 22 October 1954; Stockholm
- Education: Stockholm School of Economics
- Occupations: Financier, entrepreneur
- Father: Göran Ekelund
- Relatives: Bo Ekelund (grandfather)

Peter Erik Daniel Ekelund (born 22 October 1954) is a Swedish businessman. He was involved in the development and launch of Absolut Vodka, was chief executive of the broadband operator Bredbandsbolaget, and was the initial chairman and a major investor in video on demand service HBO Nordic.

== Career ==
Ekelund graduated from the Stockholm School of Economics in 1977. He subsequently joined the Swedish state-owned wine and spirits company Vin & Sprit, where he worked on the development and launch of Absolut Vodka together with, among others, advertising executives Gunnar Broman and Hans Brindfors.

He later worked for Swedish industrialist Hans Rausing and subsequently in the European pay television industry, including as managing director of FilmNet Benelux and in business development at its parent company NetHold.

In the late 1990s, Ekelund became chairman of the Swedish Internet consultancy Framtidsfabriken and subsequently chief executive of Bredbandsbolaget, a newly established broadband operator. During his tenure, Bredbandsbolaget entered into a strategic agreement with Cisco Systems for the construction of a broadband network in Sweden. The company also filed a complaint with the European Commission against incumbent telecom operator Telia concerning predatory pricing.

Ekelund later was chief executive of the Swedish investment company Novestra and became a partner at the New York-based private equity firm Baker Capital. He also returned to the spirits industry as one of the people behind Karlsson's, a Swedish vodka produced from new potatoes grown on the Bjäre peninsula.

In 2009, the Finnish sports pay-television service URHOtv was launched with Ekelund as the principal owner and chairman, acquiring broadcasting rights to Liiga, Finland's top-level ice hockey league. In 2012, the technical platform developed for URHOtv was spun off into Urho Digital Services (UDS), chaired by Ekelund.

That year, Ekelund's company Parsifal International formed a venture with HBO to establish HBO Nordic, a subscription television and streaming service for the Nordic countries, with UDS as a platform supplier. Ekelund became chairman, while Parsifal initially held an 80-percent stake in the company. He sold the stake to HBO in 2013 and left the chairmanship. Resumé reported that Ekelund had helped establish the organization and management of HBO Nordic before its integration more closely with HBO's international operations.

The following year, Ekelund and Parsifal were involved in establishing Starzplay Arabia, a streaming service launched in 2015 across 17 countries in the Middle East and North Africa.
