= Karlsson's vodka =

Swedish vodka

Karlsson's is a vodka launched in 2004, made of potatoes cultivated at the Bjäre peninsula in Skåne, Sweden, and named after Absolut Vodka blender Börje Karlsson. Its initial chairman was Peter Ekelund, previous project manager of the Absolut Vodka launch.
