= Dallas Waterfall Billboard =

Landmark in Dallas, Texas

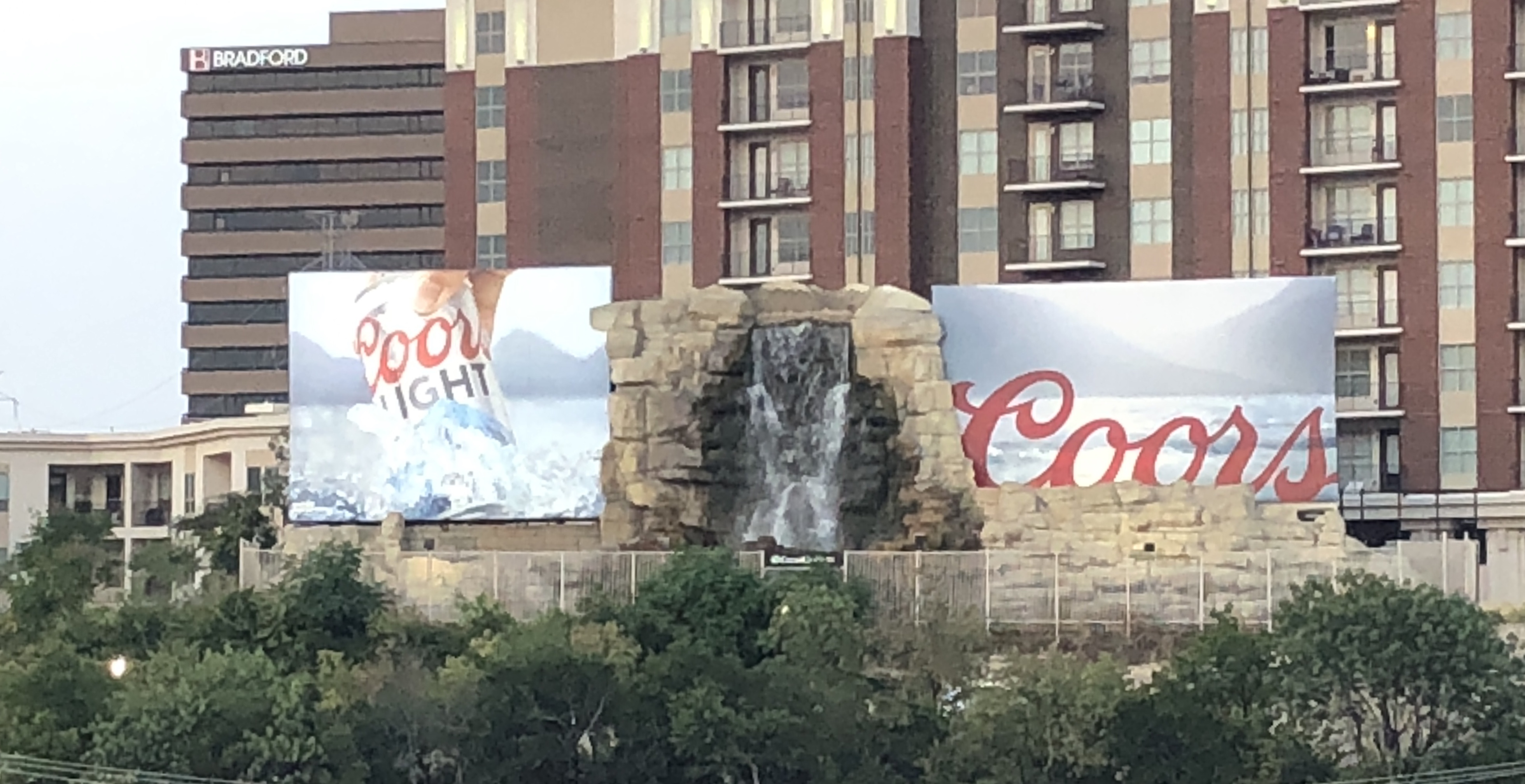
Dallas Waterfall Billboard

The Dallas Waterfall Billboard is a Dallas, Texas landmark built in 1962. It is located at 3303 Harry Hines Boulevard along a small park known as Goat Hill, a 0.85-acre park in the Katy Trail easement. It is visible from I-35E highway while driving to downtown Dallas. It is currently owned by Clear Channel Communications and leased to Coors Brewing Company.

== History ==
The billboard was conceived and designed by Tracy-Locke Company with Uhler and Company as an advertisement for Pearl Brewing Company from San Antonio, Texas. Other past sign tenants include Salem Cigarettes, Red Light Beer, Absolut Vodka, and Miller Brewing Company. In 2008, the billboard underwent renovations by Rock-Scapes and was also named an "extraordinarily significant sign" by the City of Dallas. Masterplan, Texas land use consultants with their headquarters in Dallas, were the driving force behind the approval for the renovations by City of Dallas in 2008. In 2017, the back received an installation of vinyl artwork by local artist, Kyle Steed.

== Dimensions ==
The sign dimensions are estimated at 45 feet high with a length of approximately 150 feet. The waterfall cascades 45 feet down into a pool that measures approximately 3–4 feet deep. Water is collected at the bottom basin and recirculated to the top.
