= Giancarlo Impiglia =

Italian-American visual artist

Giancarlo Impiglia (born in Rome, Italy) is an Italian-American visual artist best known for his murals and canvases of high life doings in an art-deco style influenced by Cubism.

Impiglia began as a visual artist in the Arte Povera (poor art) mode with his Blue Jean works.

In 1975 Impiglia executed a 45 foot long mural of "Old New York" in the building 99 John Street in the financial district of Lower Manhattan. In 1993 Absolut Vodka issued a color print ad featuring a commissioned work by Impilgia for their advertising campaign featuring Absolut artists, "Absolut Impilgia".

He has also created sculptures in his signature art-deco cubist influenced style.

Over the course of several decades Impiglia has been commissioned to do murals for many of the Cunard line "Queen" cruise ships, including the QE2. His work is held in the permanent collection of the Victoria & Albert Museum in London.

Impiglia lives and works in the East End of Long Island.
