= Alain Despert =

French/American Artist

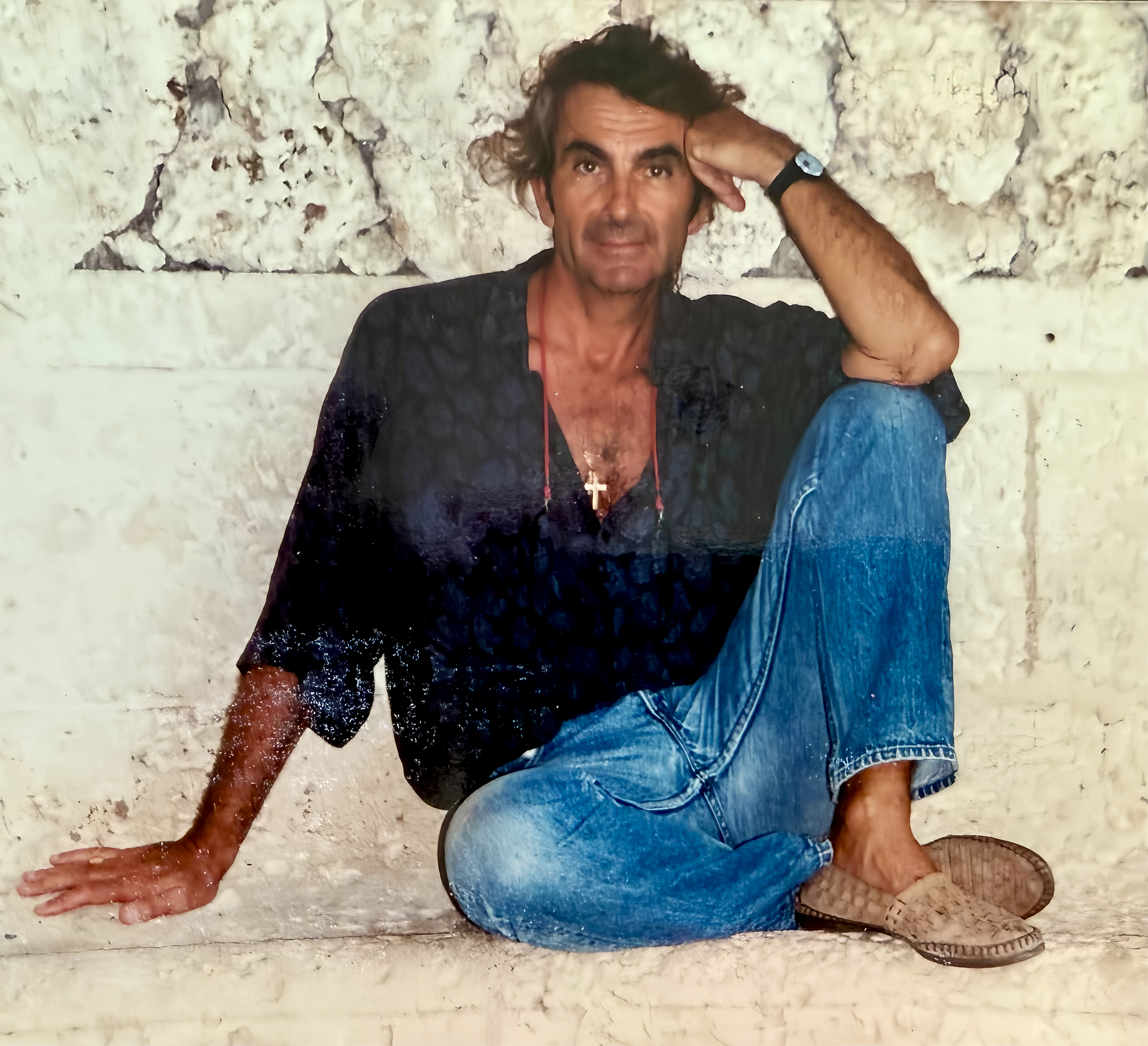
Alain Despert in 1995

Alain, Fernand, Gerard Despert (June 6, 1943 – February 14, 2024) was a French-American postmodern artist. He combined elements of pointillism, instinctual and spontaneous lines-- incorporating his unique talent of combining colors to create his bold paintings.

Despert moved to the island of Bora Bora, French Polynesia in 1986. His paintings were first discovered by famed Hollywood photographer Slim Aarons while visiting Bora Bora to photograph the island for an article for Town & Country magazine. A half page photograph of Despert and his paintings was included in the article published in the magazine.

In 1990, Despert moved to New York City to pursue his artistic dream. Shortly after his arrival, his work was noticed by Michel Roux CEO of Crillon Importers and marketer/distributor of Absolut Vodka in the United States. Mr. Roux created the Absolut Artists advertising campaign when he commissioned Andy Warhol to paint the Absolut bottle. Roux added Despert to the Absolut Artists collection. ABSOLUT DESPERT, depicting the bottle floating in the lagoon of Bora Bora, appeared full page in magazines such as Art & Antiques and Connoisseur. Despert's career as an artist was established. Other commissioned artists included Keith Haring, Ed Ruscha and Damien Hirst.

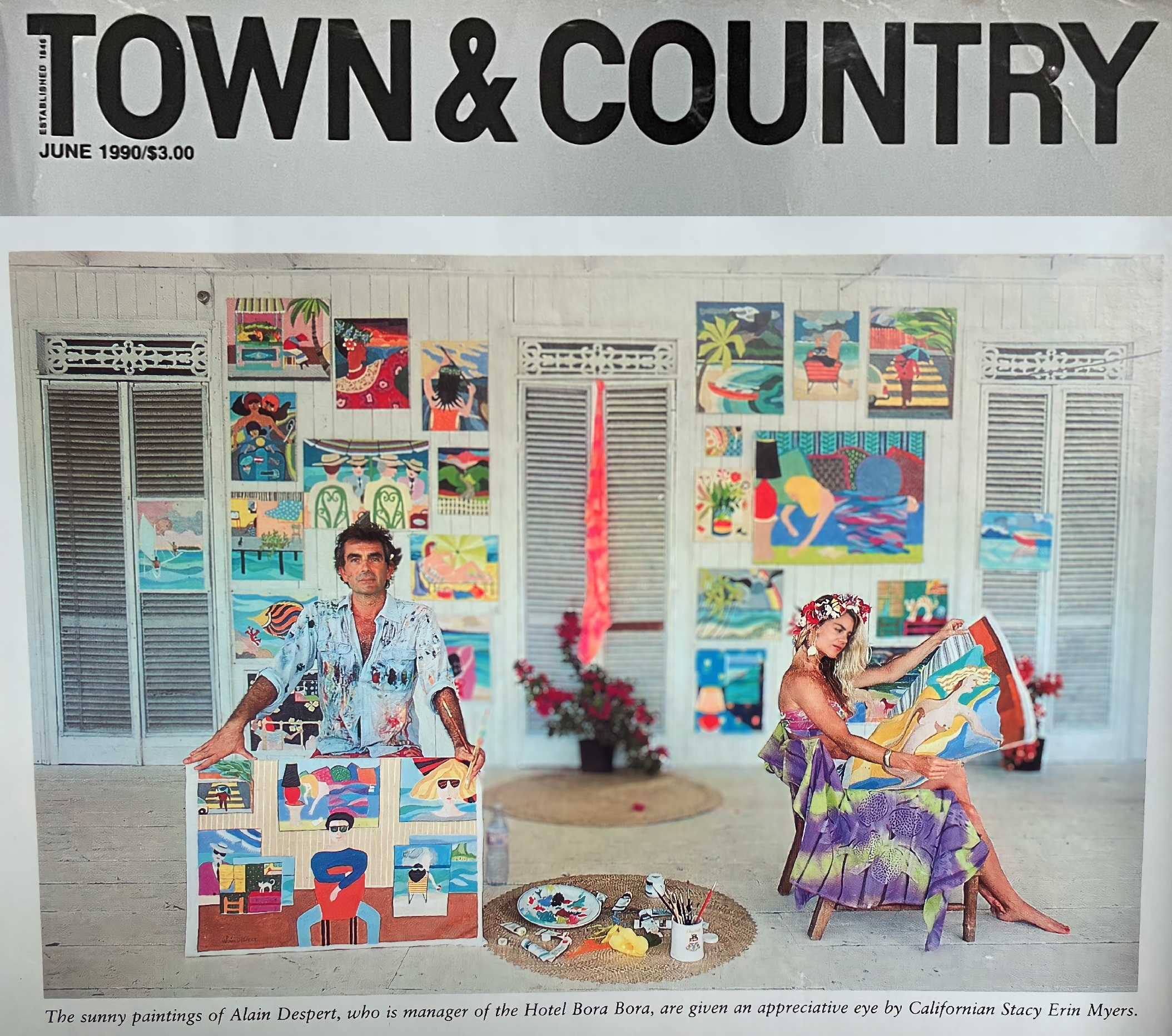
Photo of Alain and his paintings by Slim Aarons for Town & Country magazine.

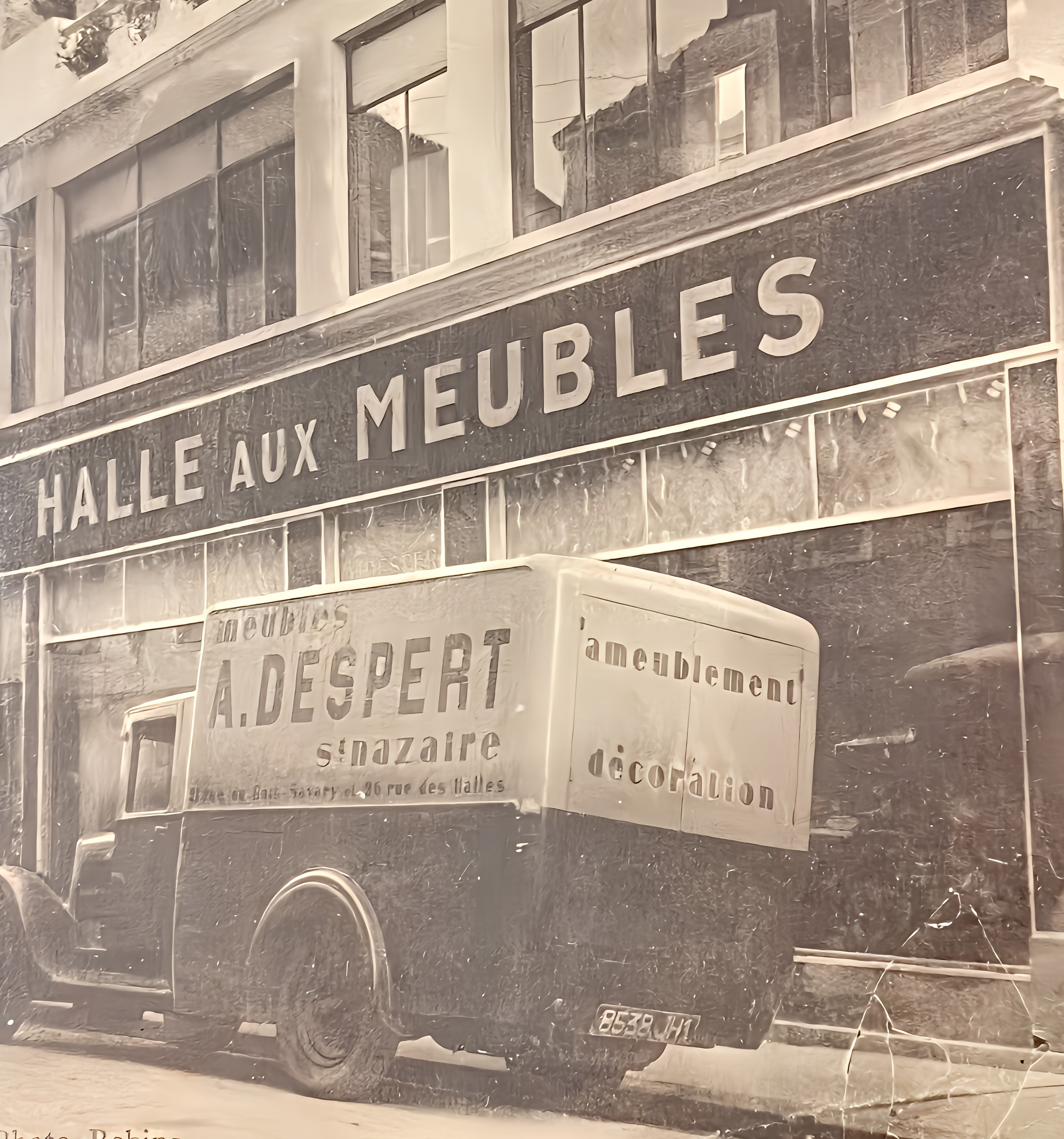
Alain's Father's Store Pre WWII, St. Nazaire France, Furniture and Home Decoration

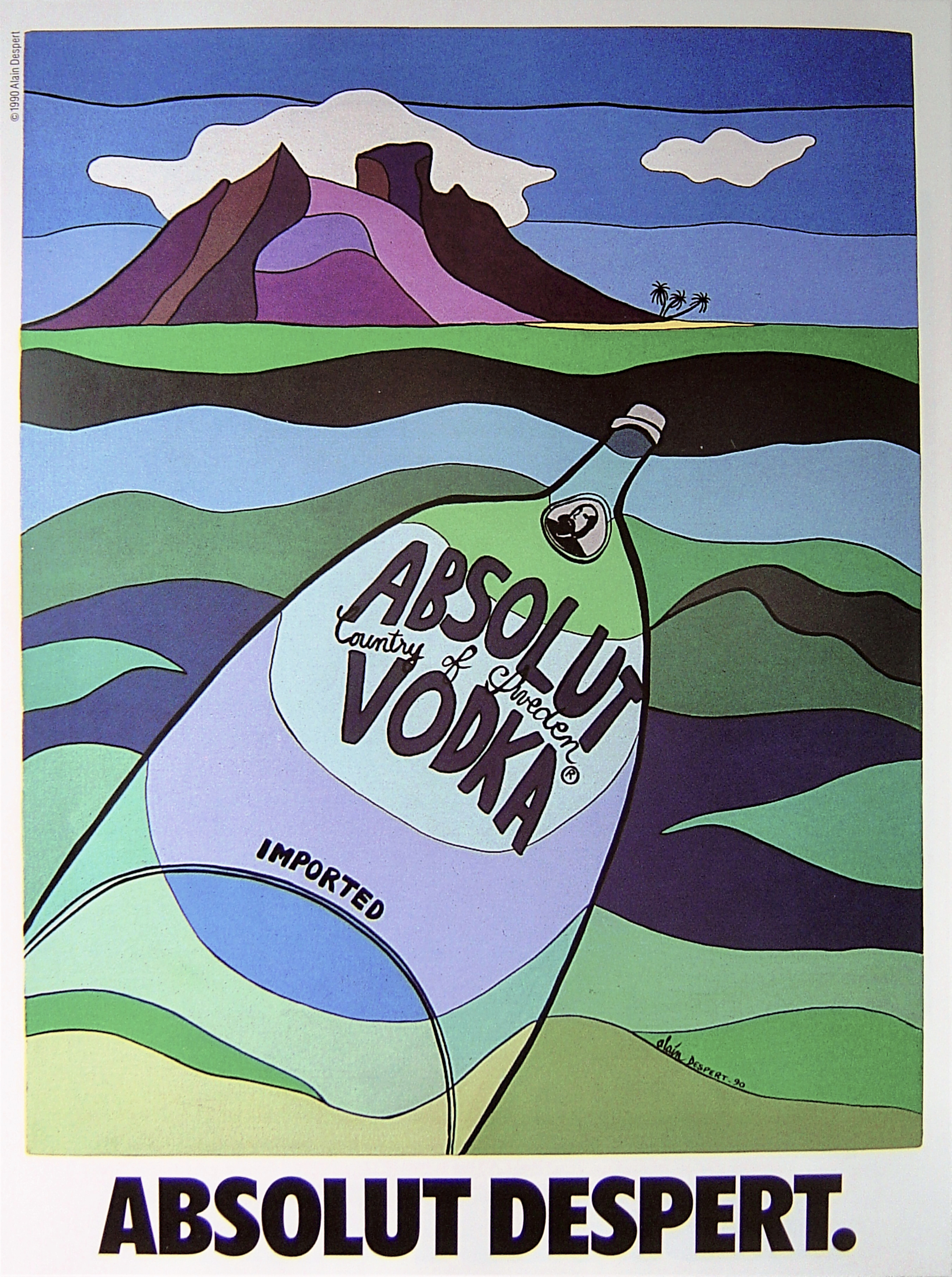
"ABSOLUT DESPERT", Spirit Museum Stockholm, Sweden

The Swedish government sold Absolut to Pernod Ricard in 2008. The government retained ownership of the Absolut Art Collection. The collection is now exhibited at the Museum of Sprits in Stockholm. The original ABSOLUT DESPERT is with the collection at the museum.

== Life and early career ==
Despert was born in Nantes, France exactly one year after D Day. At the time of his birth, his parents, Paulette Despert and Fernand Despert from Saint Nazaire were living under expulsion in the outskirts of the city during the bombing of World War II. The entire city of Saint Nazaire was demolished, including the Despert family home and their business. Despert spent the first 10 years of his life being raised in the countryside along with his three older sisters, Renee, Monique and Gisele, while they waited for the war to end and their city to be rebuilt.

Alain's father was skilled in furniture restoration and owned the largest furniture and home decor store in the center of Saint Nazaire, which he inherited from his father Antoine Despert. At the age of 11, Alain and his family moved back to Saint Nazaire after the city and the store was rebuilt. It was then that Alain discovered his passion for art when he was introduced to some of the works that his father exhibited in the store. He was inspired by modern artists such as Jean Lurcat, Roger Capron and Mathieu Mategot.

In 1960, Despert moved to Strasbourg, France to study at the Ecole Hoteliere. At age 20, after completing his higher education he joined the French Navy. He served as Maitre d'Hotel to the admiral on his submarine tour of the Greek Islands and the Amalfi Coast of Italy before his honorable discharge.

Despert moved to Cannes, France on the French Riviera in 1965 where he began his profession in the hotel industry. His hobby at the time was candid portrait photography. Despert gained access to private events at the Cannes Film Festival over several years where he photographed the most famous actors at the time. His personal collection includes hundreds of portrait photographs of personalities such as Tony Curtis, Raquel Welch and John Lennon. In 1986, Despert moved to Bora Bora as manager of the legendary Hotel Bora Bora.

== Artist career ==
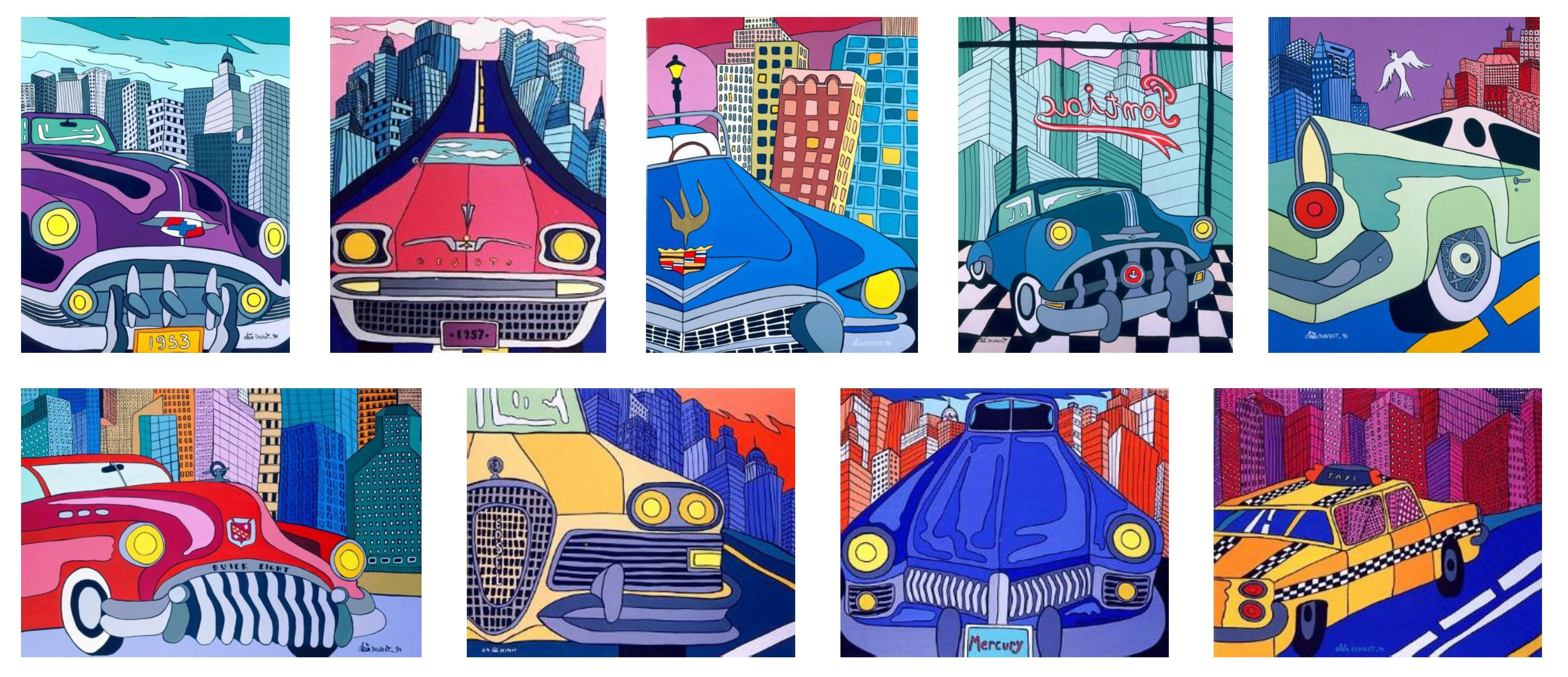
"Cars of the '50s" Series, New York 1991

The myriad of colors of the blue lagoon, flowers and simple everyday life on the island inspired Despert to start painting after he moved to Bora Bora in 1986. In 1990, after his paintings were discovered and featured in Town & Country magazine, Despert moved to New York City to paint full time. His studio was located in his large loft in the historic lower Manhattan district of South Street Seaport overlooking the East River. There he created his first series "Cars of the '50s". After he was selected as an ABSOLUT ARTIST, his career began to take off. He was given his first exhibition in New York at Rein's, a popular Restaurant & Bar where famous entertainers frequented. His paintings began selling and his work was noticed by an art collector and nightlife impresario from Paris, who became Despert's agent.

In 1993, Despert moved to Miami Beach, Florida where his agent had just opened a nightclub in the new hotspot, the Art Deco District of South Beach. Despert created his "Miami: South Beach Art Deco" series. A gallery was opened next to the club to showcase Despert's paintings. His agent sent him to Paris in 1995 and provided a studio and apartment in the 16th arrondissement for him to work followed by an exhibition at Cercle Saint-Louis. It was there where he created and exhibited his "Paris" and "Carnaval de Venise" series.

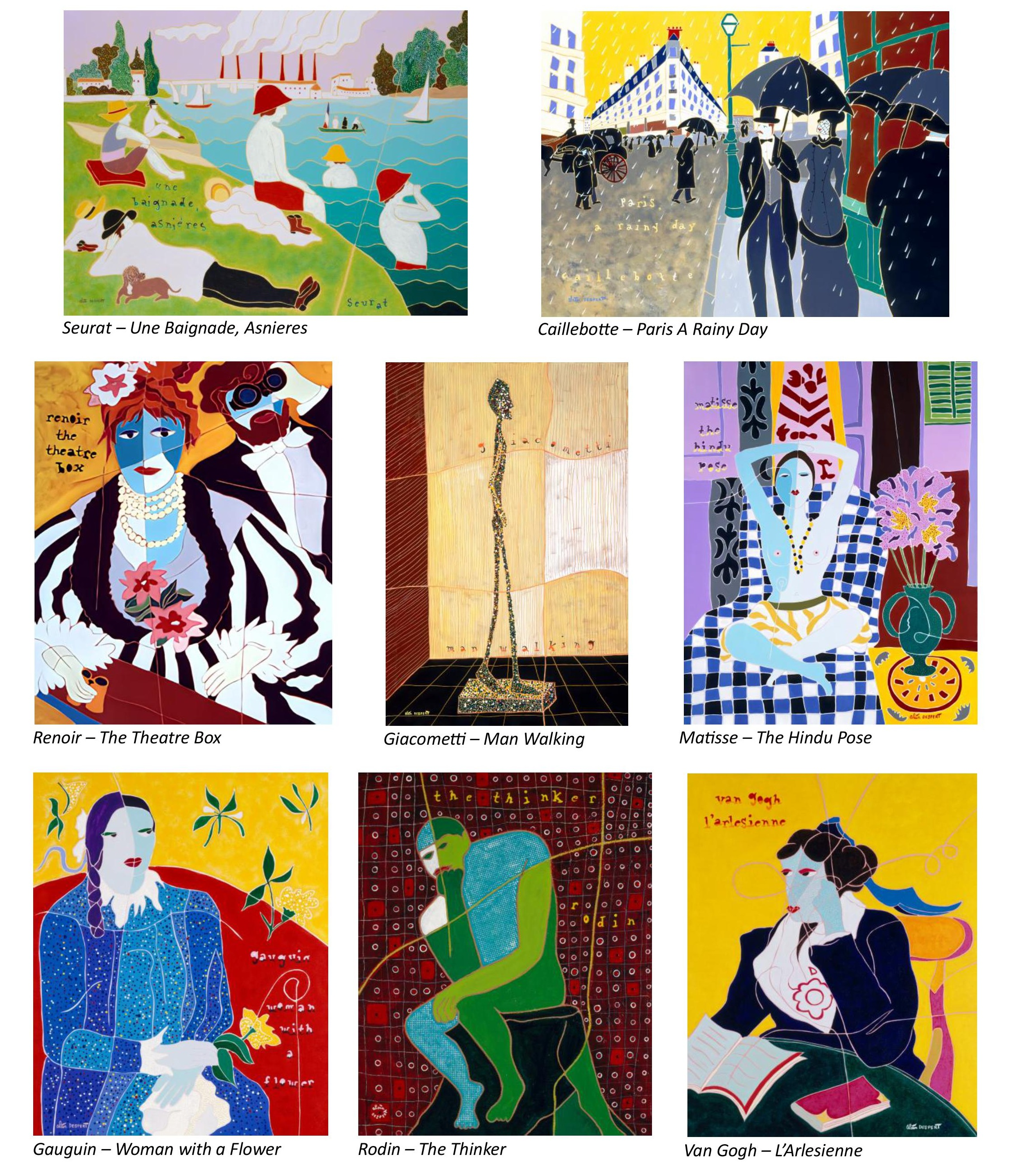
San Francisco Exhibition "Masterpieces Revisited"

Despert left Paris to explore America's Southwest. In 1996, he set up his studio in Santa Fe, New Mexico and created his "Santa Fe" series expressing the diverse culture and architecture of the region. His paintings exhibited at SITE Santa Fe and Running Ridge Gallery. He found the winters to be harsh and decided to move to San Francisco in 1997, where he had briefly lived earlier in his life. He was introduced to a prominent American art dealer and founder of The Vorpal Gallery who operated venues in both San Francisco and New York. Despert had started his "Masterpieces Revisited" series depicting his version of his favorite artworks in history. He was offered a solo exhibition in San Francisco upon completion of the series, a collection of 35 paintings.

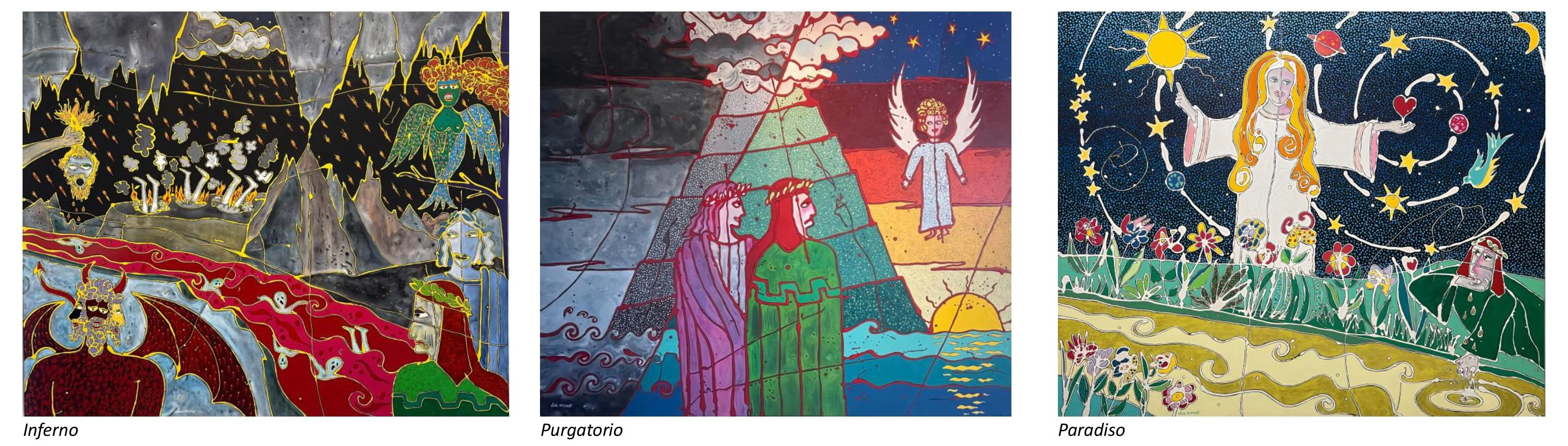
"Dante: The Divine Comedy" triptych

Despert's San Francisco exhibition was observed by a prominent businessman from Dallas, Texas. In 2000, Despert was commissioned to paint a large 3,000 square foot outdoor mural downtown Dallas in the arts district adjacent to the Dallas Museum of Art. He was offered a large studio and gallery in the district to work and exhibit his paintings. There he started experimenting with enamel paint to add depth and texture to his work. He created his first series incorporating enamel "Dante: The Divine Comedy" which became the most important work of his lifetime. The triptych "Inferno, Purgatorio, Paradiso" measures 72 by 216 inches. Next he created the "Chalkboard Series" and enamel became integral to his technique.

In 2001, Michel Roux once again commissioned a few of the Absolut Artists for the introduction of his new liquor ABSENTE. Despert created a painting of the bottle adorned by legendary green fairy. After the events of September 11 and over 10 years painting and exhibiting in the United States, he decided to return to Bora Bora at the end of the year to paint again in the beauty and peace of the island. His artist studio was built high on the mountain overlooking the blue lagoon.

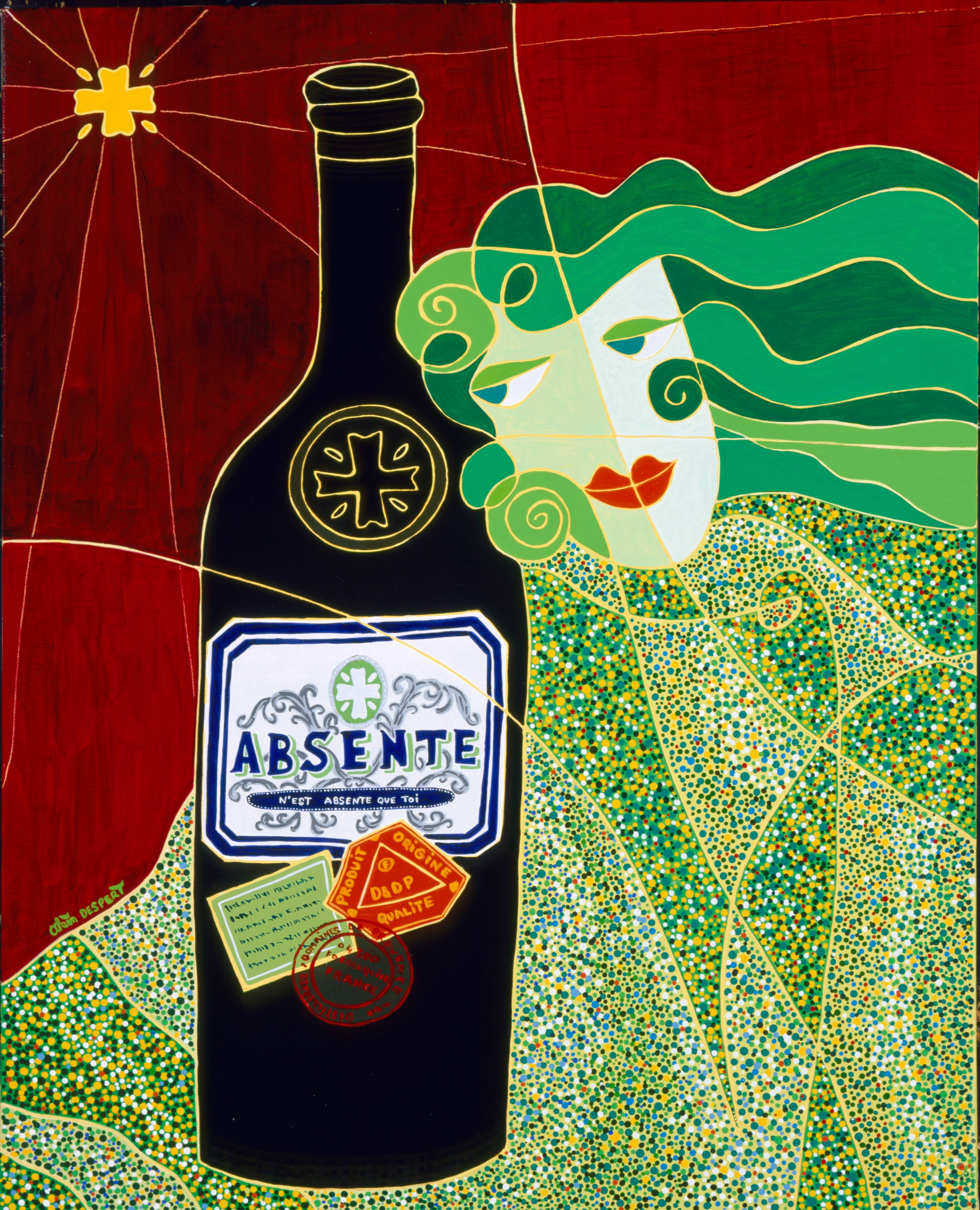
Absente "The Green Fairy"

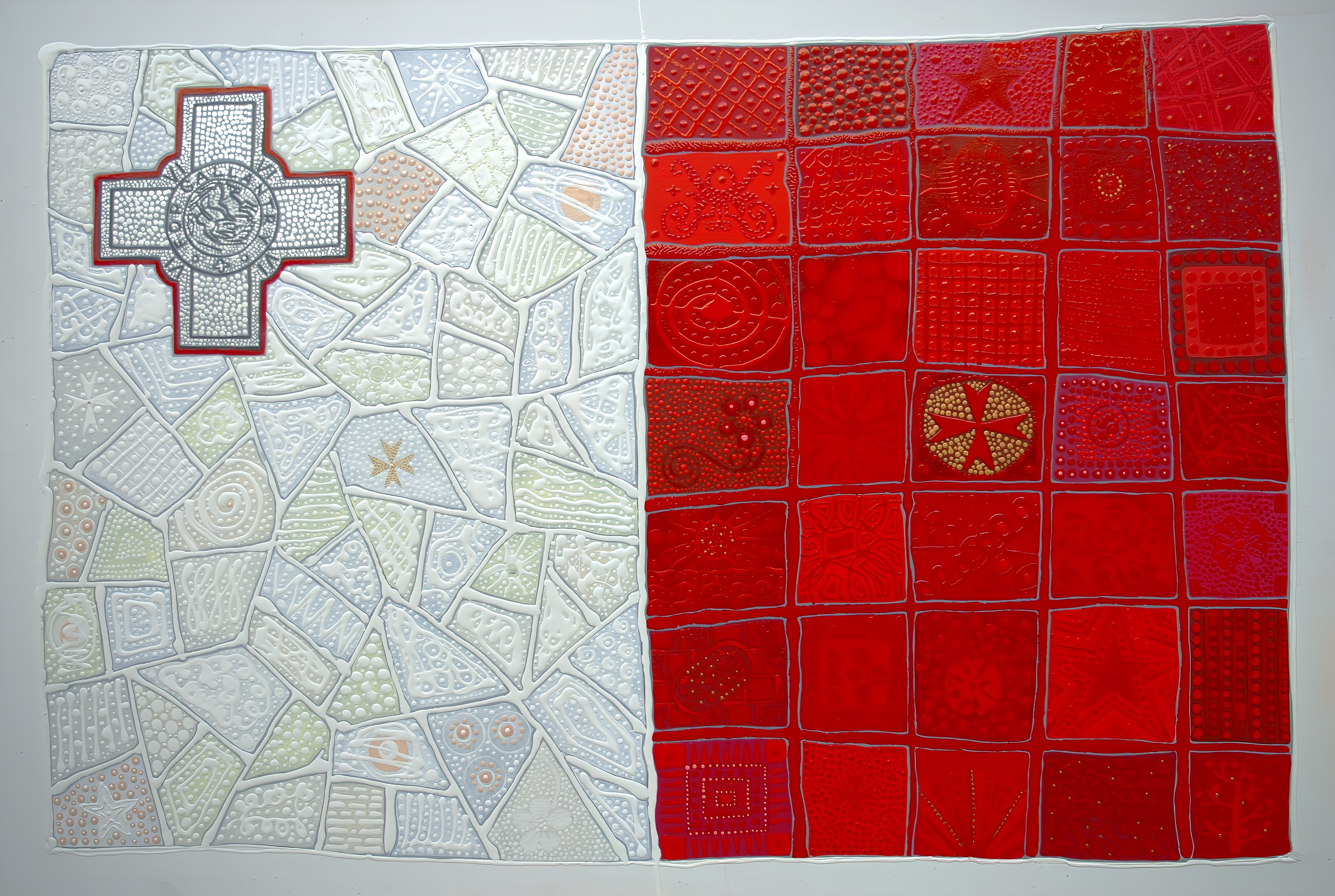
"Maltese Flag" Museum of Fine Art Malta

In 2012, Despert left Bora Bora for 2 years to revisit the Mediterranean coastlines of his French Navy days. The island of Malta was his base where he set up his artist studio to paint when he was not traveling. 2013 was Despert's first major retrospective exhibition at Auberge d'Italie in the capitol of Valletta. The exhibition consisted of 48 paintings covering his artist career from 1986 – 2012. The exhibition was inaugurated by the President of Malta, Dr. George Abela, the United States and French Ambassadors were guests of honor at the opening. Later that year, Despert was commissioned by the owner of the iconic Caffe Cordina to create a painting to celebrate the 175th anniversary. The paintings was permanently installed on the wall of the historic building on Republic Street in Valletta. The painting was unveiled by the President of Malta. Despert is recorded in Heritage Malta, the national agency for museums, conservation practice and cultural heritage. Despert's painting of the Maltese Flag remains at Muza, the Museum of Fine Art in Valletta.

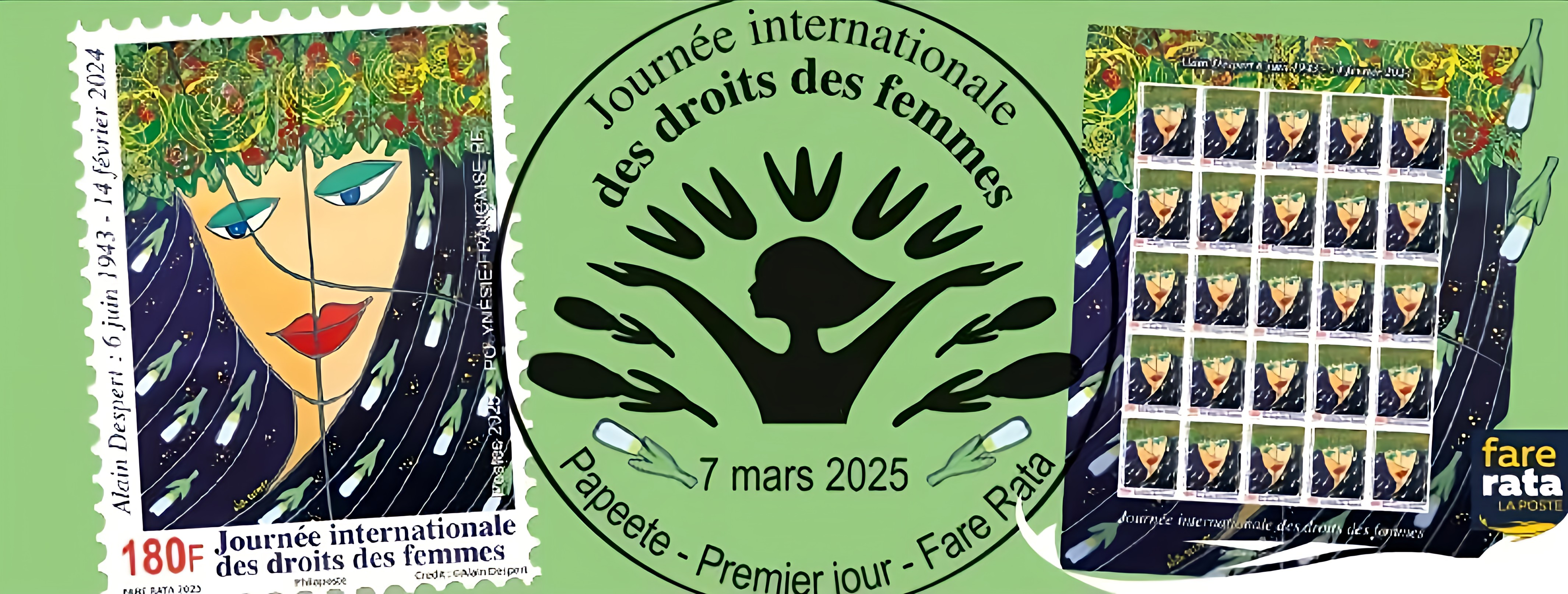
Official French Poynesian postage stamp in honor of Despert.

Despert returned to Bora Bora in 2014 where he offered private viewings of his work at his mountain top artist studio. He continued to paint in Bora Bora until his death in 2024. In March 2025, The French Polynesian Government honored Alain Despert with an official postage stamp to mark his history in Bora Bora forever.

== Personal life ==
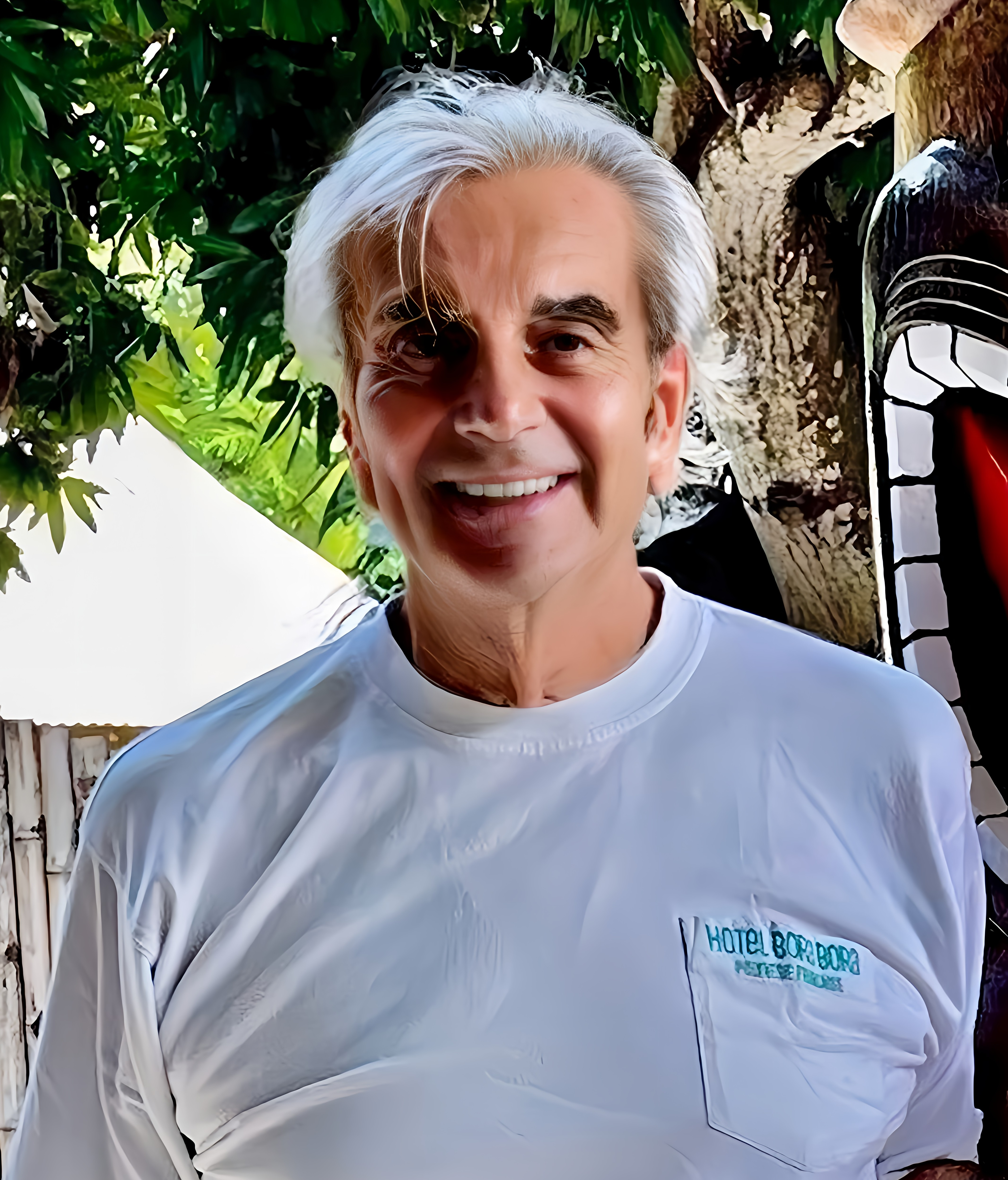
Alain Despert in 2023

Despert met Karen Brown, a former NY Advertising Executive, in Miami in 1994. The couple immediately fell in love and became inseparable for 30 years until his death. Karen took over the management of Despert's art career in 1996. They were married in the United States in 2001. Late in 2023, Despert was diagnosed with a small melanoma under his foot, which was removed. He was advised to undergo a series of immunotherapy treatments as a result. Shortly after his first treatment, he experienced a rare toxic reaction to the medication and was air med evacuated to the hospital in Tahiti. He was admitted immediately into the intensive care unit where he suffered many complications for 6 weeks until his death. Karen, his wife, announced Despert's death on Valentine's Day 2024. He is laid to rest in a private hilltop mausoleum in Bora Bora with an eternal view of the blue lagoon.

Despert had 2 children from his earlier years, Virginie Paulette Elisabeth, born 1966 in Lorient, France and Jerome Alain Michel Despert, born 1969 in Cannes, France.
