= URHOtv =

Defunct Finnish sports television channel

- Country: Finland

Programming
- Picture format: 576i (SDTV)

Ownership
- Owner: Parsifal Sport Oy

History
- Launched: 10 September 2009
- Closed: 1 April 2014

URHOtv was a Finnish pay television channel focused on sports. It began broadcasting on 10 September 2009, with SM-liiga ice hockey as its main programming. The channel was operated by Parsifal Sport Oy, owned by Swedish businessman Peter Ekelund.

URHOtv later acquired rights to several Finnish sports competitions, including the Veikkausliiga, Korisliiga and the Finnish volleyball league.

In 2012, technology developed for URHOtv was spun out into Urho Digital Services, which supplied the streaming platform used by HBO Nordic.

The company entered debt restructuring in 2013, and in 2014, its restructuring was discontinued and broadcasting ceased on 1 April 2014.
