= Gunnar Broman =

Swedish advertising executive (1928–2020)

- Born: 3 January 1928
- Died: 22 September 2020 (aged 92)
- Occupations: Advertising executive, creative director
- Known for: Absolut Vodka

Gunnar Broman (3 January 1928 – 22 September 2020) was a Swedish advertising executive and creative director. He played a central role in the development and launch of Absolut Vodka and also worked on advertising campaigns for brands including Wasabröd and Pripps Blå.

== Career ==
Broman worked as creative director at Ted Bates before joining Lars-Börje Carlsson in 1969 to form the advertising agency Carlsson & Broman. The agency produced campaigns for clients including Wasabröd and Pripps Blå and was later sold to DDB. Broman was also worked on the creation and marketing of Swedish low-fat milk.

In the 1970s, the state-owned Vin & Sprit commissioned Broman's agency to develop a Swedish spirits product for export to the United States. Broman developed several concepts and proposed using a bottle inspired by a nineteenth-century apothecary bottle; art director Hans Brindfors developed the bottle design. Broman also participated in finding an American importer and wrote text used on the bottle. The resulting Absolut Vodka was launched in the United States in 1979.
