= Hans Brindfors =

Swedish advertising executive and designer

- Born: 30 June 1947 (age 79)
- Occupations: Art director, designer, advertising executive

Hans Lennart Brindfors (born 30 June 1947) is a Swedish advertising executive, art director and designer. He was involved in the design of the Absolut Vodka bottle and founded the advertising agency Brindfors and the design agency Brindfors Design.

== Career ==
Brindfors entered the advertising industry in the 1960s at the ad agency Arbmans.

In the 1970s, he became an art director at Carlsson & Broman, where he worked with Gunnar Broman on the design of the Absolut Vodka bottle. Brindfors developed aspects of the graphic design, including the typography and the use of printing directly on the glass.

In 1978, Brindfors founded Brindfors Annonsbyrå with Lars Arvid Boisen and Nordin. Its first major account was the Swedish airline Linjeflyg. IKEA was also one of the agency's first clients. Brindfors subsequently worked on the company's advertising for several decades. In 1992, he sold Brindfors Annonsbyrå to Lowe Group, after which the agency became Lowe Brindfors.

In 1995, Brindfors left the advertising agency and founded Brindfors Design with Peter Györki, focusing on strategic design. Early assignments included a redesign of Marabou milk chocolate and the creation of the Signum private-label brand for the Swedish retail cooperative KF.

In 1999, Brindfors Design was sold to the multinational communications group WPP and integrated into its Enterprise IG network, and was later renamed Brand Union Stockholm. Brindfors served as its creative director and at times as acting chief executive.

In 2009, Brindfors was appointed to the design jury of the Cannes Lions International Festival of Creativity. He was also a juror for the iF Design Award in 2012.

In 2016, the Swedish Advertisers' Association awarded him its Stora Annonsörpriset for his contribution to the advertising industry.
