= Absolut Vodka =

Swedish brand of vodka

- Type: Vodka
- Manufacturer: The Absolut Company (Pernod Ricard)
- Origin: Åhus, Sweden
- Introduced: 1879
- Alcohol by volume: 40%
- Proof (US): 80–100
- Website: www.absolut.com

Absolut Vodka is a Swedish brand of vodka developed and launched by Vin & Sprit in 1977, and since 2008 a part of the French group Pernod Ricard.

Absolut is the second largest vodka brand in the world, as of 2025 selling 12.3 million 9 litre-cases annually. The vodka is made from winter wheat and is produced only in the locality of Åhus.

== History ==
=== Origins ===
In the 1860s, Lars Olsson Smith established a spirits purification and distilling business in Reimersholme, then outside Stockholm's city limits. Using fractional distillation, the business produced brännvin initially marketed as Tiodubbelt renat brännvin ("tenfold purified brännvin") and later as Absolut rent brännvin ("absolutely pure brännvin").

After Stockholms utskänkningsaktiebolag obtained a monopoly on serving spirits in the city in 1876, Smith competed by selling his brännvin at lower prices from Reimersholme and providing free boat transport for customers. The dispute became known as the first brännvinskriget ("spirits war"), lasting from 1877 to 1879. A settlement between Smith and his competitors led to the formation of Reymersholms Spritförädlings AB in 1879.

=== Development, 1977–1979 ===
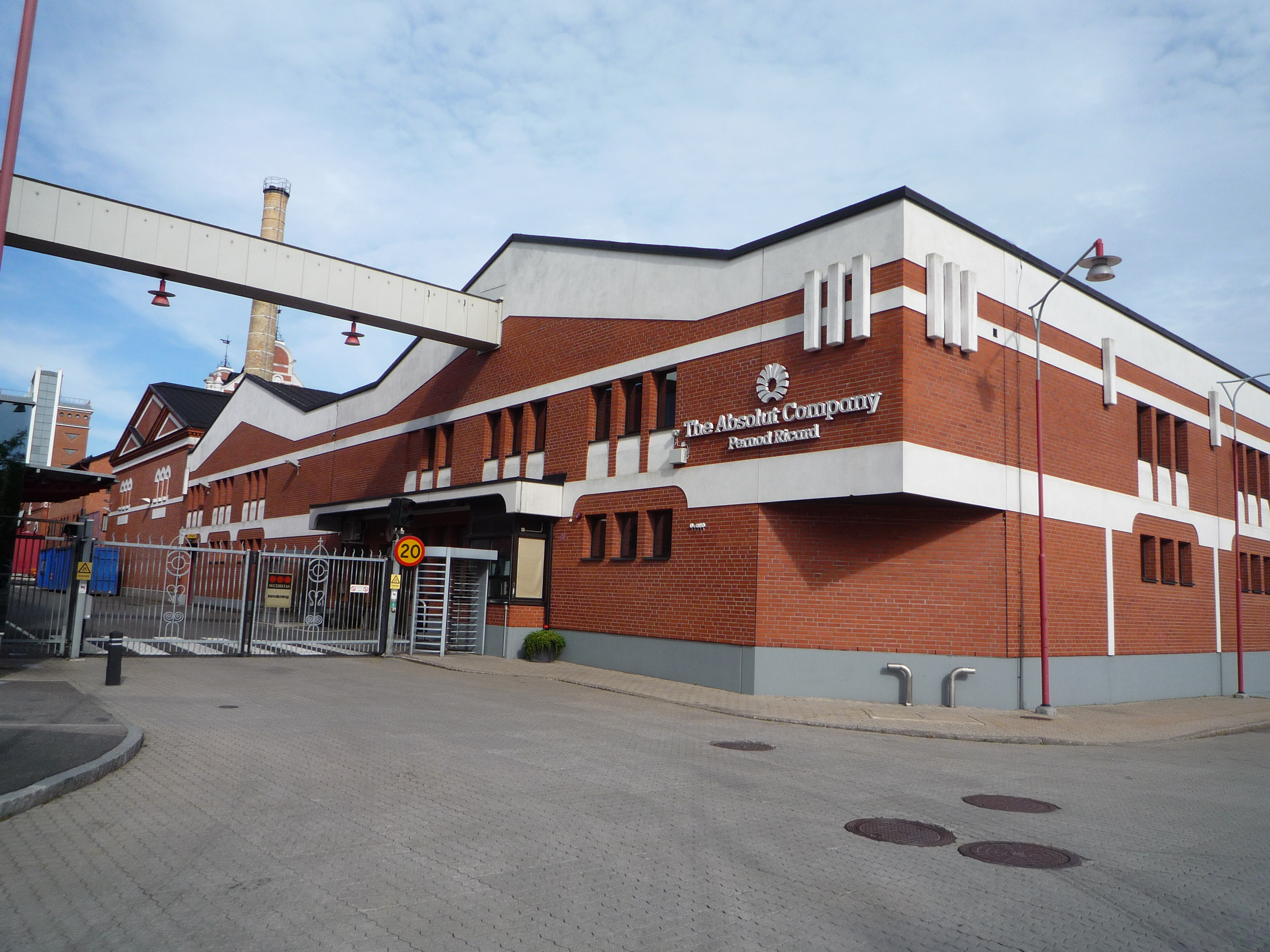
The Absolut Company plant in Åhus, Sweden

In 1977, under chief executive Lars Lindmark, the state-owned Vin & Sprit began developing a product for the export market. Advertising professionals Gunnar Broman and Hans Brindfors developed concepts for a Swedish vodka, drawing on the name Absolut rent brännvin. Together with Vin & Sprit project manager Peter Ekelund, they tested the concepts in the United States.

The selected concept used a clear bottle inspired by an old apothecary bottle, with lettering printed directly on the glass instead of a paper label. It received mixed responses during market research, including concerns that it would be difficult to distinguish on shop shelves.

The vodka itself was developed alongside the packaging. Absolut received an exemption allowing it to be made from grain at a time when Swedish brännvin production was based on potatoes. Vin & Sprit's laboratory head, Börje Karlsson, developed the original blend and subsequently worked on the brand's flavoured varieties.

It was originally intended for the exported vodka to be named "Absolute Pure Vodka", a close translation of the Swedish name, however due to the fact Absolute was a common adjective in English, it could not be registered as a legal trademark in the United States. As a result, the original Swedish word for "Absolute" was chosen, and Absolut Vodka was selected as the final name.

In 1978, Vin & Sprit reached an agreement with Carillon Importers to introduce the vodka to the United States under the name Absolut Country of Sweden Vodka. Carillon's advertising agency initially requested substantial changes to the bottle. Following revisions, Lars Börje Carlsson completed the design, with the words "Absolut Vodka" in blue and descriptive text printed directly on the glass.

=== Launch in 1979 ===
Absolut Vodka was introduced at a spirits trade convention in New Orleans in spring 1979. The first American order, placed from Boston on 20 April 1979, comprised 700 cases containing 6,300 litres of vodka. Production was based in Åhus, where the export programme contributed to securing employment and increasing the factory's workforce.

Sales grew before the subsequent TBWA advertising campaign began. Following the Soviet invasion of Afghanistan in December 1979, some American bars and restaurants boycotted Soviet vodka. In February 1980, Time reported that Absolut and Poland's Wyborowa were among the brands seeking to increase their share of the American import market in response.

=== Expansion and subsequent developments ===
In 1981, TBWA launched a campaign featuring the bottle alongside two-word headlines such as "Absolut Perfection". Under Michel Roux at Carillon, Absolut became the best-selling imported vodka in the United States in 1985. That year, Andy Warhol produced an advertisement depicting the bottle, beginning a series of collaborations with artists.

In 1981, Absolut also became one of the first brands to advertise in LGBTQ spaces, including LGBTQ-orientated magazines such as the The Advocate.

In 2008, the Swedish government sold Vin & Sprit to Pernod Ricard. The transaction was completed on 23 July and valued the business at approximately €5.63 billion (equivalent to €7.59 billion in 2023).

In 2021, the company redesigned the bottle's lettering and decorative details while retaining its overall shape.

Absolut began experimenting with a recyclable paper-bottle for their vodka in 2023. The paper bottle is only sold in the UK, in the city of Manchester.

== Branding and bottle ==
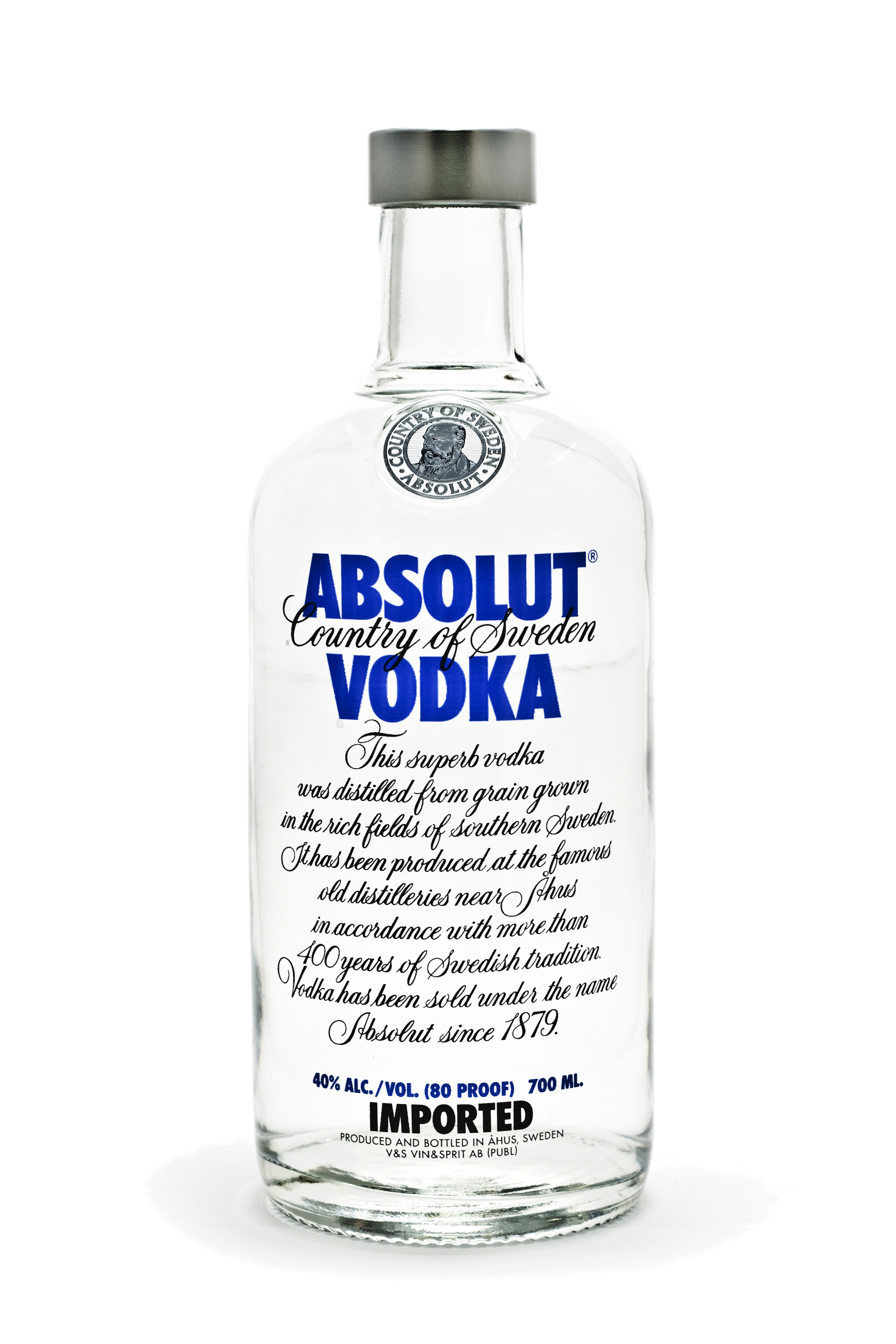
The original Absolut Vodka bottle, before its design update in 2021

The Absolut bottle is an iconic part of the branding of Absolut since its launch in 1979. It was designed after an old pharmaceutical bottle found by Gunnar Broman in an apothecary shop. The brand name and a substantial block of copy, explaining the origins of the product, was applied directly to the clear glass. A medallion of L.O. Smith was added above the brand name, and has been manufactured in multiple different kinds of materials since its creation.

Flavours have different designs, such as a different logo colour and a coloured backdrop to reflect the respective flavour, for example a plain white logo and bright yellow backdrop for Absolut Citron, or a green logo and a red backdrop for Absolut Watermelon.

The regular flavourless vodka is also occasionally painted with rainbow colours as a part of the brand's long-standing support of the LGBTQ community. The artwork is also commonly changed for limited-edition runs, for example the Absolut Haring design, a tribute to Keith Haring.

The bottle received a design change in 2021, which removed the paragraph on the front of the bottle, the "Country of Sweden" text between the logo. The change didn't update the shape of the bottle. The following year, in 2022, Absolut also redesigned the packaging of their flavour ranges.

== Advertising ==
Ad for Absolut Mandrin, 1999

In the early 1980s in New York, Absolut Vodka was popular among the creative community. In 1981, Absolut's first advertising campaign was created by TBWA for the brand's U.S. Importer, Carillon Importers, Ltd. The first of these ads, typical of the rest, featured a picture of the bottle with a halo over the cap above the slogan "Absolut Perfection".

The first advertising campaign ran for more than 15 years from its launch. The campaign has encompassed many different kinds of ads, such as art, fashion, cities, spectaculars, Hollywood, etc. Their advertising has won hundreds of awards, including charter membership in the American Marketing Association's Marketing Hall of Fame. Absolut was inducted into the Hall in 1992 along with just two other brands: Coca-Cola and Nike. In the same year, Freedom Rings were featured in the first gay-specific Absolut Vodka ad, entitled Absolut Spada.

In 1983, Carillon's president and CEO Michel Roux approached the artist Andy Warhol, whom he paid $65,000 to create an advertisement for Absolut as part of the brand's iconic Absolut Art Initiative.

In the 1990s, Absolut Vodka began granting the Artist of the Year title to select visual artists, a distinction that came with a guaranteed global advertising placement. These campaigns blurred the boundaries between marketing and contemporary art, making the title a coveted marker of prestige in the creative world. By partnering with high-profile names like David LaChapelle, Robert Rauschenberg, Keith Haring, and Jean-Michel Basquiat, Absolut spotlighted both the brand and the featured artists on an international stage, solidifying the brand's connection to the world of modern art. Over the years, Carillon commissioned the work of well-known painters, graphic designers, fashion designers, as well as many up-and-coming artists. During the 2017 Corporate Art Awards Ceremony hosted by the President of the Italian Republic Sergio Mattarella at the Quirinal Palace, Absolut received by pptArt a special award "for their long-running collaboration with 550 artists on 850 projects to shape their corporate image and brand". The talents included such names as Damien Hirst, Rosemarie Trockel, Helmut Newton, Javier Mariscal, Maurizio Cattelan, Louise Bourgeois, Alain Despert, Ron English, Giancarlo Impiglia, and many, many more.

In 1996 Richard Lewis the Chiat/Day executive who ran the Absolut art campaign for the advertising firm published Absolut Book: The Absolut Vodka Advertising Story (Journey Editions).

In 2005, Absolut invited American singer Lenny Kravitz to participate in its promotional campaign. The song "Breathe" was recorded and released. The song was remixed many times by various DJs.

In 2007, Absolut introduced its new global campaign, "In An Absolut World", created by TBWA/Chiat/Day.

In 2008, an advertisement placed in Mexican publications and on Mexican billboards featured a map of the U.S. and Mexico with the boundaries between the two as they were prior to the 1836 Texas Revolution and the Mexican–American War. Media outlets reported on some American consumers' reactions at the advert's perceived insensitivity to immigration issues. Absolut responded that the adverts were purely whimsical, with no political or nationalist agenda, but its critics were adamant. Absolut later issued a public apology and withdrew the advert.

In 2009, Absolut debuted a campaign with renowned fashion photographer Ellen Von Unwerth and actresses Kate Beckinsale and Zooey Deschanel to celebrate different Absolut drinks. In the same year, the brand launched the Absolut Art Awards to commemorate 30 years of collaboration with the world of modern art.

In 2010 Absolut collaborated with Spike Jonze to create a short film entitled I’m here. The short film was screened at festivals such as Sundance Film Festival and Berlin Film Festival.

In 2012, Absolut partnered with Swedish House Mafia to create an original track and music video to promote Absolut Greyhound cocktail. "Greyhound"–which is the title of the drink, the video, and the actual music track is a video created by TBWA\Chiat\Day, where three groups of racing enthusiasts converge on the Bonneville Salt Flats to watch robotic greyhounds speed across the plains, holding pink Absolut Greyhounds in their hands.

In 2013, Absolut launched the Global 'Transform Today' Campaign by the creative agency, Sid Lee. The creative features four artists. Sid Lee recruited four international emerging artists to inspire younger generations. French artist, director and musician Woodkid, American digital media artist Aaron Koblin, fashion designer Yiqing Yin and Brazilian graphic novel artists Rafael Grampa is featured.

Absolut launched the Absolut Creative Competition in 2018 which was an art competition. The next year, in May 2019 the global winner was announced, who was selected by global juries such as Mickalene Thomas, Aaron Cezar and Bose Krishnamachari. Sarah Saroufim from Lebanon was declared the winner from 7,500 entrants with her design.

== Flavours ==
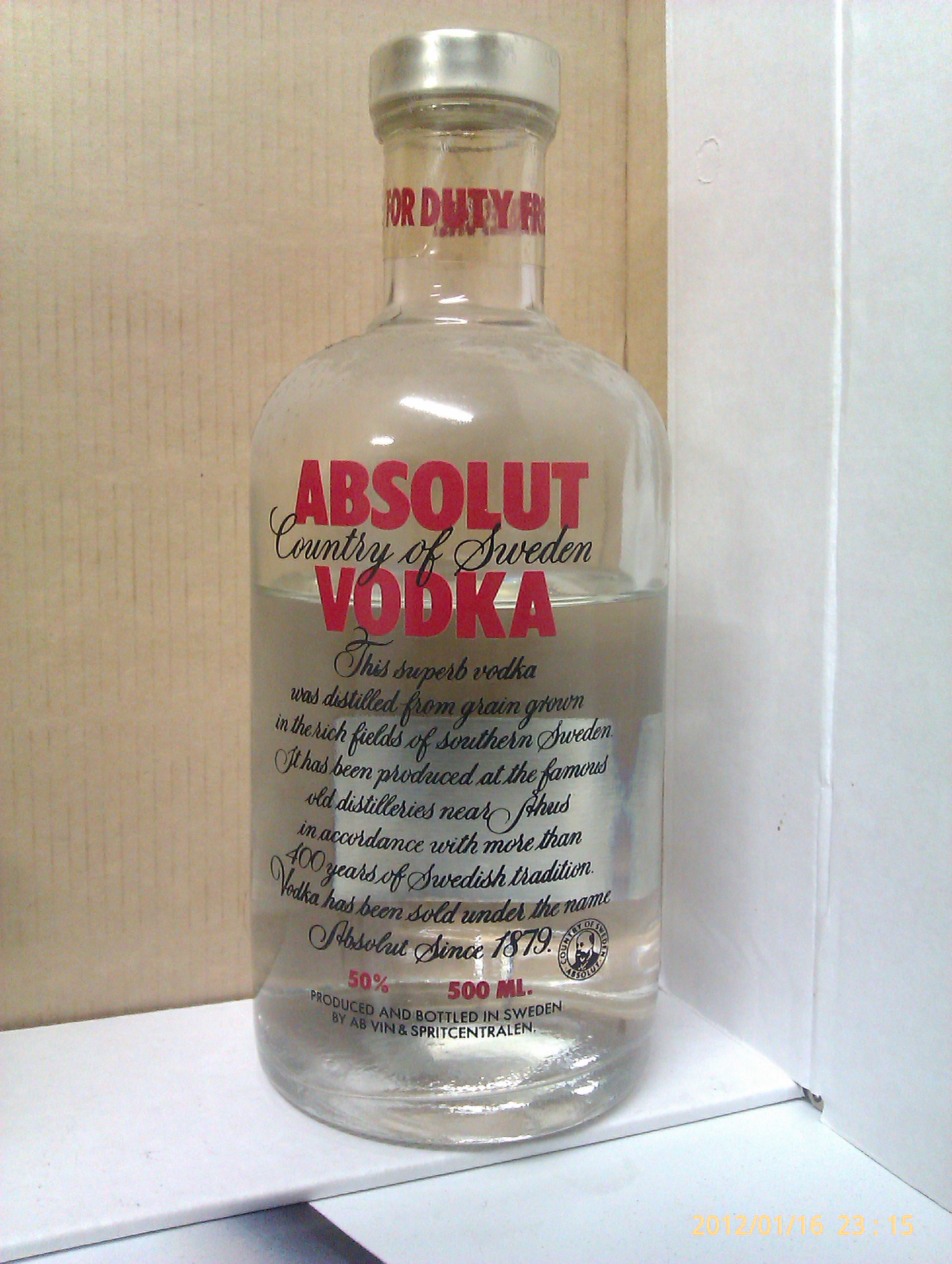
Original Absolut "Red Label" vodka

Absolut Vodka is produced in a variety of flavours. Absolut also produces a stronger variant of their vodka, known as "Absolut 100", which is 50% ABV (100 proof). Until 2007, this variant was unofficially known as Absolut Red Label, as it had a distinctive red logo rather than the regular blue logo. Flavours can also sometimes have a slightly decreased alcohol content, such as 38% or 35% ABV.

Flavours
Name	Flavour	Introduced	Discontinued
Peppar	Roasted jalapeños, green tomato and dried herbs	1986	No
Citron	Lemon	1988	No
Kurant	Blackcurrant	1992	No
Mandrin		1999	No
Vanilla	Vanilla with notes of toffee, caramel and bourbon	2003	No
Raspberri	Raspberry	2004	No
Peach (Note: Originally called Apeach until it was re-named in 2021.)		2005	No
Ruby Red	Grapefruit	2006	Yes
Pears		2007	No
Berri Açai	Acai, blueberry and pomegranate	2010	No
Wild Tea	Black tea and elderflower	2010	Yes
Mango	Mango	2010	No
Apple (Note: Originally released as Orient Apple.)	Red apple and ginger	2011	No
Gräpe (Note: Originally released as Grapevine.)	White grape, dragon fruit and papaya	2011	Yes
Cherrys (Note: Originally released as Cherrykran.)	Cherry and sweet plum	2012	No
Hibiskus	Hibiscus and pomegranate	2012	Yes
Cilantro	Cilantro and lime	2013	Yes
Passionfruit		2013	No
Lime		2016	No
Extrakt	Spices	2017	No
Grapefruit		2018	No
Watermelon		2021	No
Smoky Piña	Smoky pineapple and chilli	2022	No
Sensations	Tropical fruit	2023	No
Wild Berri	Berries	2023	No
Hunni	Honey	2024	No
Nordic Spice	Cardamomo and ginger	2024	No
Orange Peel	Aged orange peel and coffee	2024	No
Tabasco	Chilli pepper	2026	No

== Controversies ==
After pausing its production in Russia due to the Russian invasion of Ukraine in February 2022, Pernod Ricard resumed the export of Absolut Vodka in April 2023, leading to widespread criticism in Sweden. As a result, Pernod Ricard decided to once again stop its operations in Russia.

== See also ==
- Absolut Art Collection
- Explorer Vodka
