= Honda Today =

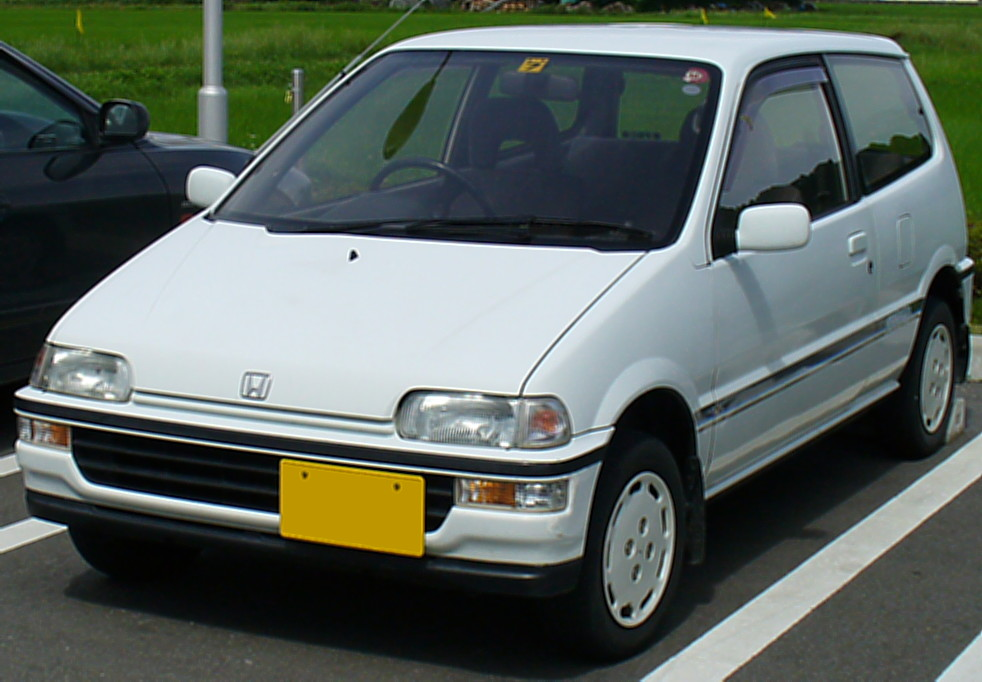
- 1990–1993 Honda Today JA2

Overview
- Manufacturer: Honda
- Production: 1985–1998

Body and chassis
- Class: Kei car
- Layout: Front-engine, front-wheel-drive Front-engine, all-wheel-drive

Chronology
- Successor: Honda Life (1997)

The Honda Today (Japanese: ホンダ・トゥデイ) is a kei car produced by Japanese automaker Honda beginning in 1985. It was replaced by the Honda Life in 1998.

The Today represented Honda's reentry into kei car production. Honda had abandoned kei passenger cars in 1975, choosing only to keep manufacturing the Honda Acty kei truck and the related Honda Street microvan in that segment. After 1975, Honda's smallest car was the Civic, until the introduction of the smaller City in 1981, which was a supermini with an engine larger than what kei car legislation allowed.

The Today name has since been used by Honda for a 50 cc scooter manufactured in China, available from 2002 until 2016.

== First generation ==
Honda Today (JW1-JW4, JA1-JA3)
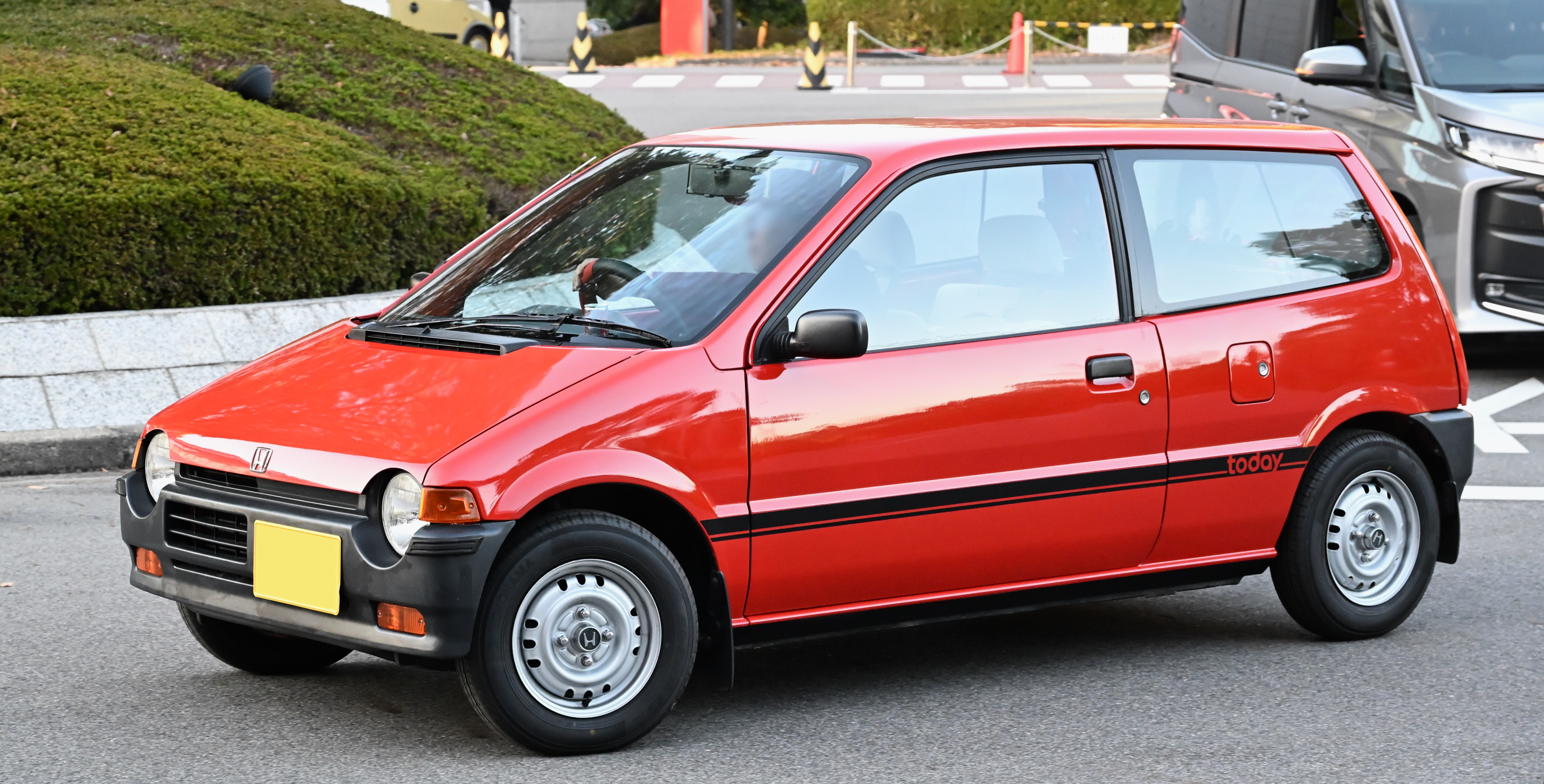
- 1985–1988 Honda Today G (JW1)

Overview
- Production: 1985–1998

Body and chassis
- Body style: 3-door hatchback 3-door light van
- Layout: Front-engine, front-wheel-drive (JW1-JW3, JA1-JA2); Front-engine, four-wheel-drive (JW4, JA3)

Powertrain
- Engine: 545 cc EH I2; 547 cc E05A I3; 656 cc E07A I3
- Transmission: 4-speed manual; 5-speed manual; 2-speed Hondamatic; 3-speed automatic

Dimensions
- Wheelbase: 2,330 mm (91.7 in)
- Length: 1985–1990: 3,195 mm (125.8 in); 1990–1998: 3,295 mm (129.7 in)
- Width: 1,395 mm (54.9 in)
- Height: 1985–1990: 1,315 mm (51.8 in); 1990–1998: 1,350 mm (53.1 in)
- Curb weight: 1985: 550–560 kg (1,212.5–1,234.6 lb); 1994: 620–730 kg (1,366.9–1,609.4 lb)

The first generation Today (JW1) was introduced in September 1985 as a three-door hatchback—it was originally only sold as a light commercial van, as the tax structure favored such vehicles. The rear axle was a coil-sprung torsion beam, while the front axle used struts with forward-reaching control arms.

Only intended for the Japanese domestic market, the Today was initially launched with three different model specifications, with the entry model being the 'F', followed by the 'M' and the top-of-the-range 'G'. It was introduced at newly established Japanese Honda Primo dealerships alongside the "Primo" sedan, the Civic. The flat-roof hatchback design was shared with the incrementally larger supermini Honda City, the compact Honda Civic, and the mid-size Honda Accord AeroDeck. Thanks to a very compact engine and the trailing-arm rear suspension, Honda was able to give the car minimal overhangs and a wheelbase of 2,330 mm (91.7 in), the longest of any kei car at the time, and with the car's efficient packaging, the passenger compartment took up over three quarters of the car's length. Unusually, the bottom was asymmetrical with the parking brake offset to the left, allowing additional space for the driver's seat.

Originally available with either a four-speed manual or a two-speed Hondamatic semi-automatic transmission, the Today was powered by the Gold Wing-derived water-cooled OHC 545 cc Honda EH two-cylinder engine producing 31 PS (23 kW)—the same as used in the Acty kei truck. The engine had a single-barrel Keihin carburetor and, being a commercial vehicle, did not need a catalytic converter but could make do with an EGR system to control emissions. The transmission was positioned to the right side of the engine, with the differential mounted beneath. In a period road test of a Hondamatic-equipped car belonging to the General Motors Test Fleet, Car and Driver measured a top speed of 69 mph (111 km/h), while the 0-60 mph (97 km/h) sprint required 34.2 seconds. The standing quarter mile time was a lengthy 23.9 seconds with a closing speed of 56 mph (90 km/h).

A five-speed manual became available on the special edition Today G in September 1987. Another special edition appeared in February 1987; the Today M-based "Pochette" received special colors and was aimed at female buyers. The Pochette became a regular model by 1990 and remained available into the second generation.

In a market where three-cylinder engines were the norm, the ultra-compact EH was already outdated and was replaced by the 547 cc three-cylinder, four-valve, single overhead camshaft E05A engine in February 1988. At the same time, the Today underwent a minor facelift in which the car's round headlights were replaced by aerodynamic lenses matching the rest of the Honda family. The hood had to be made taller to accommodate the bulkier engine. The rear was also modernized, with the bootlid featuring a small spoiler on top and a larger rear windshield. Beneath, there was a new, smoother bumper with restyled taillights which eventually found their way onto both the second and third generation Acty vans (and the Vamos Hobio); this lamp design remained in production until mid-2018. The facelift also received a regular three-speed automatic with a torque converter rather than the earlier Hondamatic, and for the first time, a passenger version became available (in March 1988). Sales targets were 9,000 per month for the van and 1,000 per month for the private car version.

The suspension was also upgraded, as was the dashboard. Chassis codes were JW2 for the commercial model and JA1 for the passenger model. Available trims were F, M, G, Ri, Ri-Z (JW2), XG (JA1), and XTi (JA1). The XG and all fuel injected models were better equipped to handle highway driving, featuring front stabilizing bars and front disc brakes. The fuel-injected versions were equipped with progressive coil springs at the rear axle. Later, lower-cost XE and XL passenger versions were added as light commercial cars began losing their domination in the segment. Power outputs varied, since commercial vehicles suffered less stringent emissions regulations. The lower-end models all produced 36 PS (26 kW), although the passenger models used a "PGM-carb" electronic carburettor. The fuel-injected models produced 44 PS (32 kW) in commercial cars, 42 PS (31 kW) in automatic vans and manual passenger models, and 40 PS (29 kW) in passenger models with the automatic transmission.

=== 660 cc era ===
In accordance with new kei car regulations in March 1990, the Today's bumpers were enlarged to give the car a length of 3,295 mm (129.7 in), and the engine was enlarged to 656 cc. Power output was 42 PS (31 kW) for carbureted models and 52 PS (38 kW) for fuel-injected models. The new chassis codes were JW3/JW4 (commercial 2WD, 4WD) and JA2/JA3 (passenger version 2WD, 4WD). April 1990 saw the addition of a permanent four-wheel drive version with an independent rear axle and struts.

=== Discontinuation ===
The second-generation Today was introduced in 1993 and was designed around passenger comfort, unlike the more utilitarian original model. As such, the passenger models of the original Today (JA2/JA3) were discontinued immediately. The lineup was further reduced in September 1994 to the basic Pro F, the Humming X, and the four-wheel-drive Pro QP and Humming QX models. The fuel-injected version had already been discontinued and the five-speed manual was only available coupled with four-wheel drive. The other models received a four-speed manual or an optional three-speed automatic. The well-equipped Humming models were an attempt at recapturing buyers who were put off by the lack of a rear hatch of the second generation Today, and proved more popular than the newer model. Both the Pro and Humming models continued to be built in parallel until kei car regulations were changed again in October 1998.

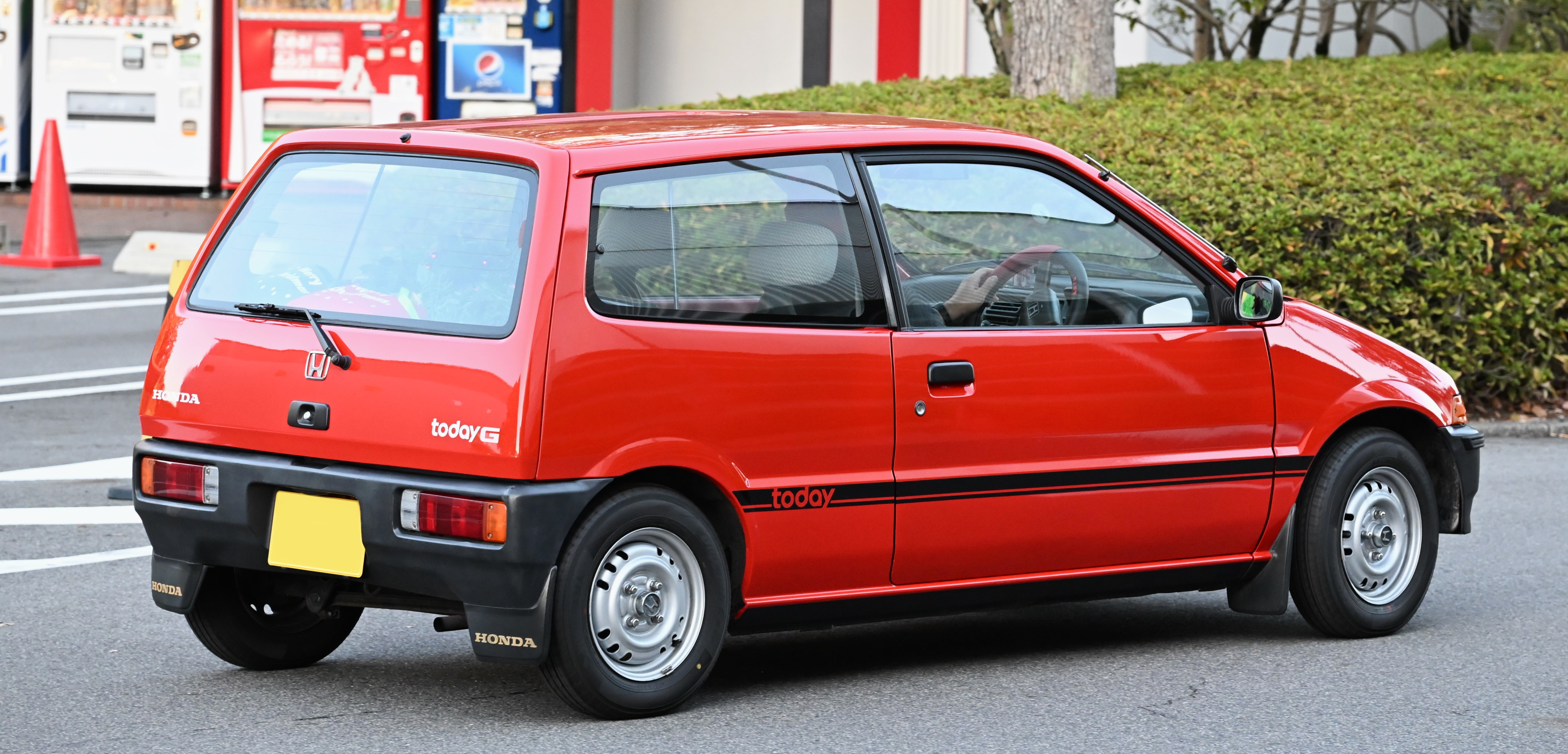
Rear view of the original Today

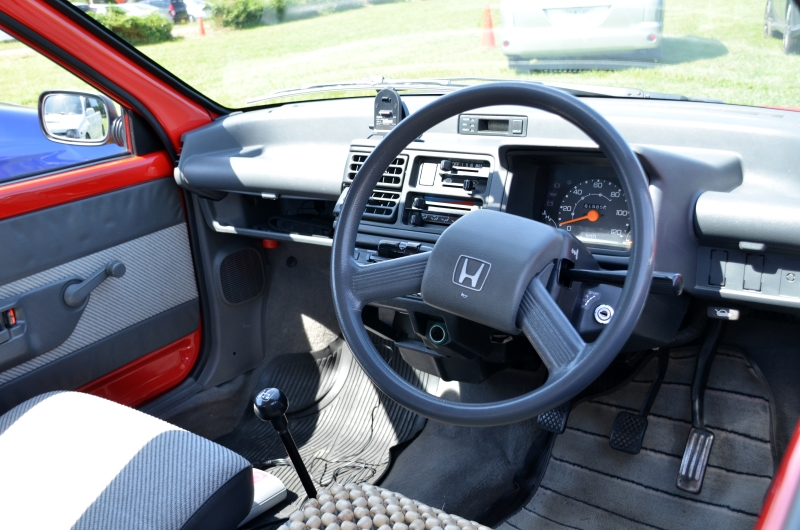
Interior of the original Today

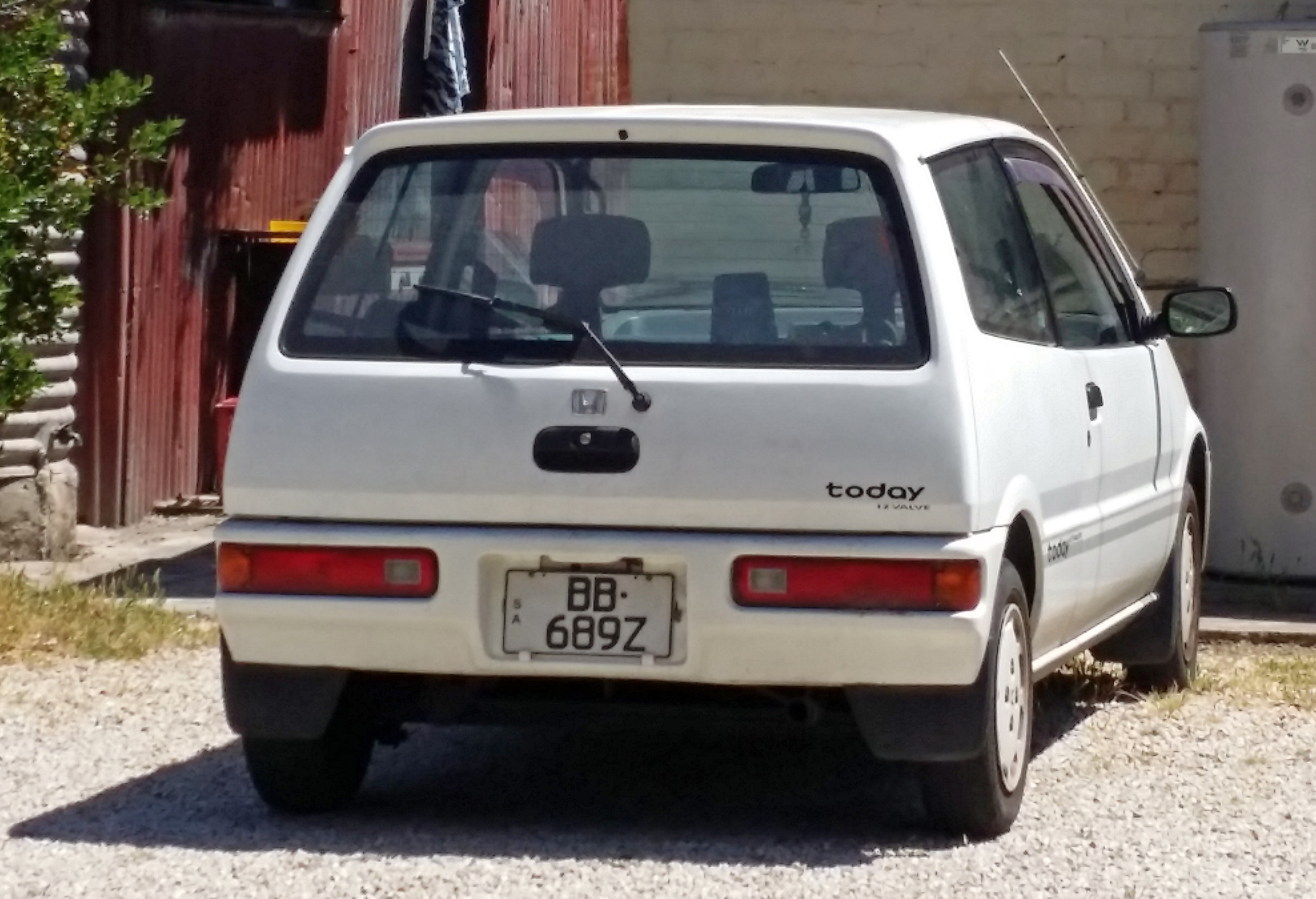
First facelift Today Van (JW2; rear)

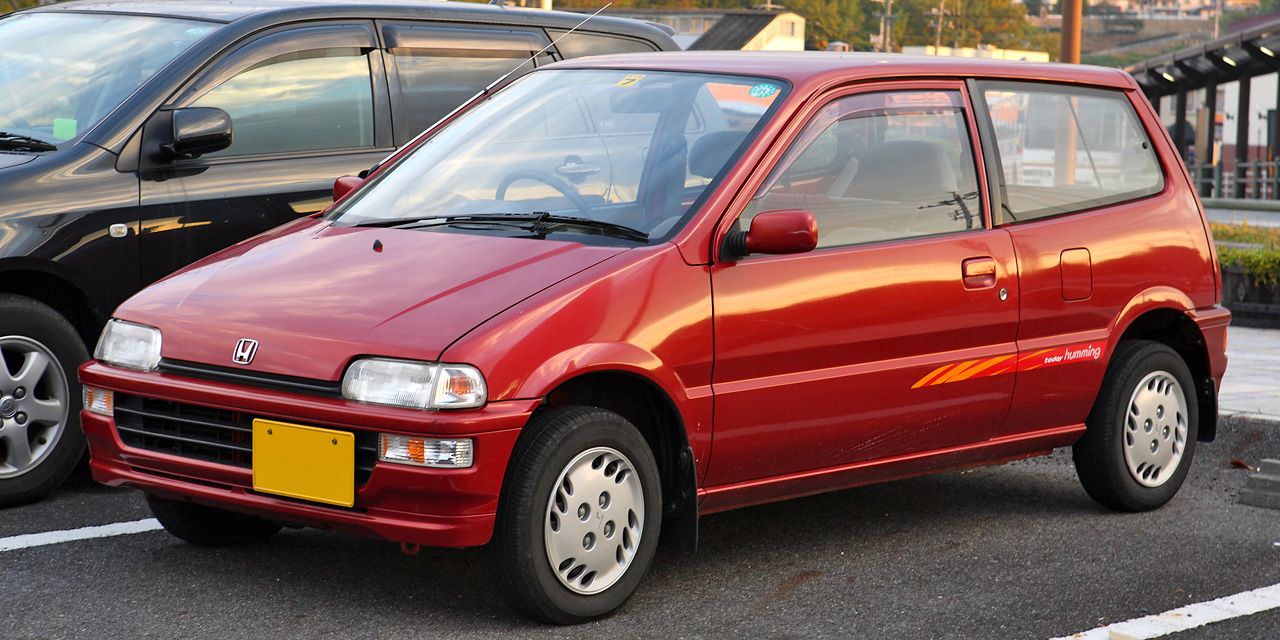
Honda Today Humming, one of many later special editions (JW3; 1994–1998 light van)

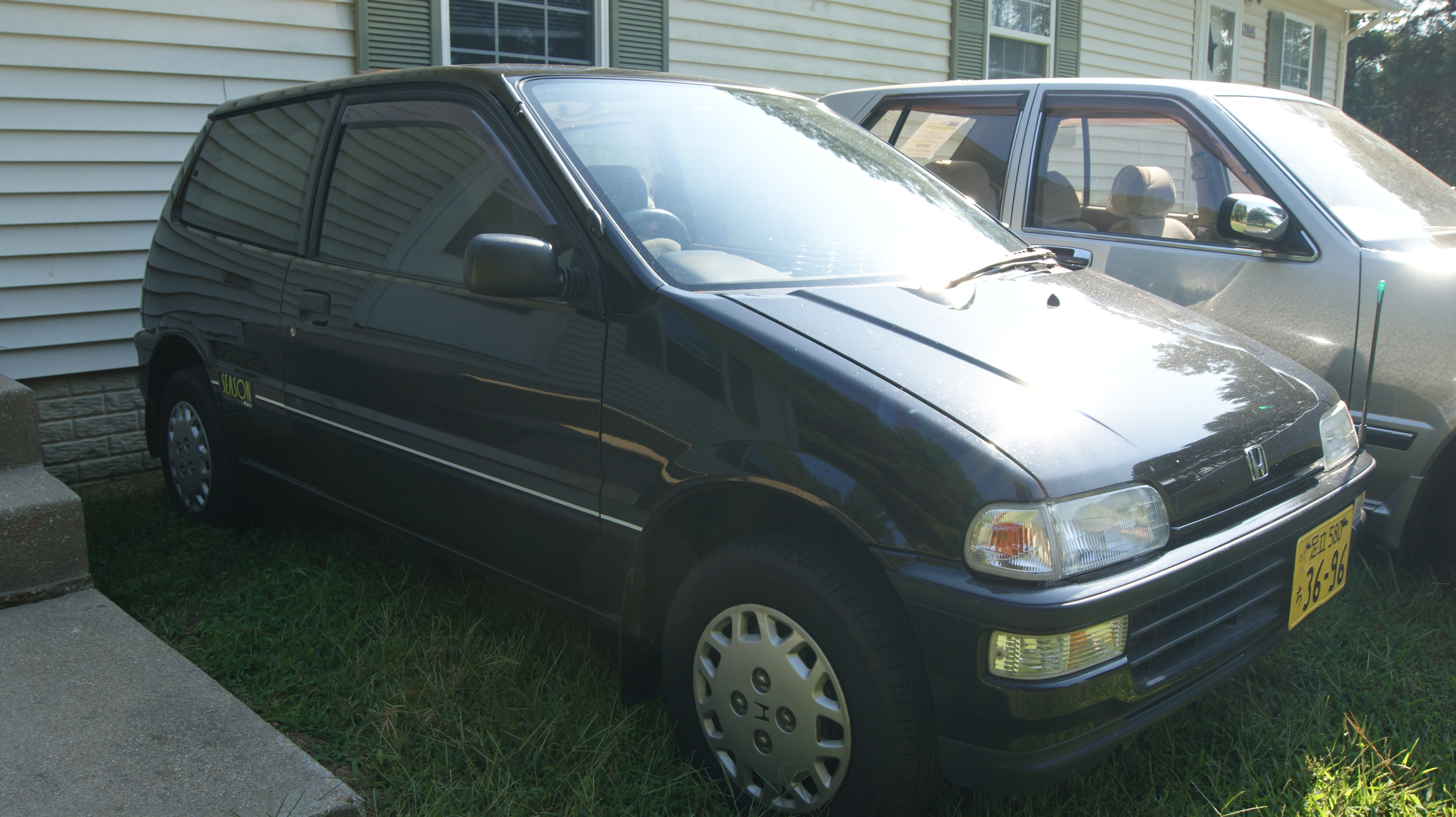
JA3 Honda Today "Season" featuring Realtime 4WD

== Second generation ==
Honda Today (JA4/JA5)
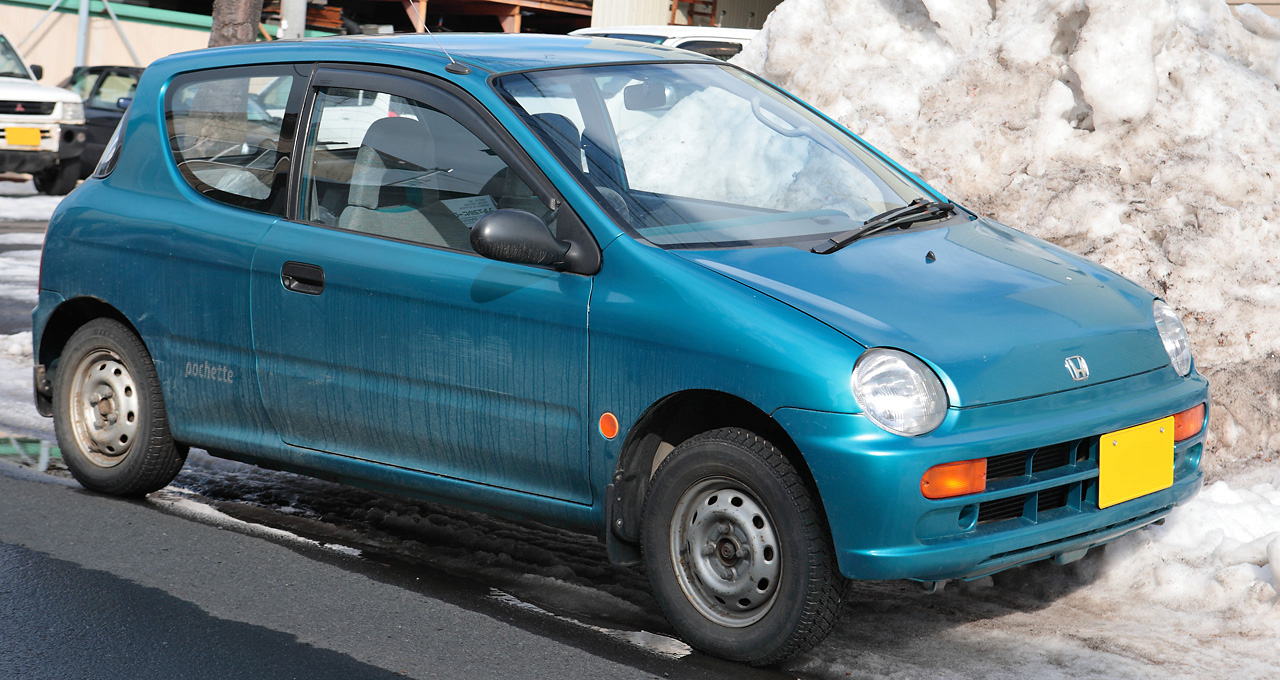
- Honda Today Pochette 2-door (pre-facelift)

Overview
- Production: 1993–1998

Body and chassis
- Body style: 2/4-door sedan (pre-facelift); 3/5-door hatchback (facelift)
- Layout: Front-engine, front-wheel-drive (JA4); Front-engine, four-wheel-drive (JA5)

Powertrain
- Engine: 656 cc E07A I3
- Transmission: 5-speed manual; 3-speed automatic

Dimensions
- Wheelbase: 2,330 mm (91.7 in)
- Length: 3,295 mm (129.7 in)
- Width: 1,395 mm (54.9 in)
- Height: FF: 1,350 mm (53.1 in); 4WD: 1,370 mm (53.9 in)
- Curb weight: 650–760 kg (1,433.0–1,675.5 lb)

In January 1993, a redesigned Honda Today was announced. Unlike the first generation, which was originally designed to meet light commercial car requirements, the second generation Today was designed as a passenger car from the outset. Thus, the suspension was tuned for a more comfortable ride and the car did not have a hatchback; in its place was a downwards-opening tailgate, like on the 1992 Civic three-door (although unlike the Civic, the Today's rear window did not open). This influenced the "Pochette" trim name ("pouch" in French), which described how the tailgate opened. While the unusual, wraparound rear window was designed to maximize the view to the car's sides, the design also increased the rigidity of the bodyshell. As with the original Today, the interior was not symmetrical. With the second generation, Honda took full advantage of the extra space on the right and made the driver's seat slightly wider than the front passenger seat, at 500 and 460 mm (20 and 18 in) respectively. These features were decided on after research indicated that the car's target audience were mostly single young women who often drove alone, with little need for cargo space or room for additional passengers.

While the sedan was initially only available as a two-door, the four-door Today Associe (Japanese: トゥデイ アソシエ) was added in May 1993. As per Honda, the name is derived from the English word "Associate". On four-door models with power windows, the rear windows were still manually operated. Aside from on the lowest equipment level (Mi), a driver's side airbag was offered as an option. On the better equipped front-wheel drive models, an ABS system was also available, although this encroached considerably on the space in the luggage compartment. Ordering the airbag or ABS system was also the only way to get three-point ELR (emergency locking retractor) belts on the rear seats instead of the usual waist belts.

The 1993 Today was available with two engines, a standard fuel-injected 656 cc three-cylinder E07A engine, and a high output version of the same engine with MTREC technology for the Xi model (called Rs in the facelift model). MTREC stands for "Multi Throttle Responsive Engine Control" and features individual throttle bodies for each cylinder. This engine was borrowed from the Honda Beat, although the Today's engine was tuned for more low-end torque than the high-end Beat. MTREC-engined models received a three-spoke steering wheel and a tachometer. Power outputs were 48 PS (35 kW) at 6300 rpm for the regular model and 58 PS (43 kW) at 7300 rpm for the MTREC-equipped versions; torque figures were 5.8 and 6.1 kg⋅m (57 and 60 N⋅m; 42 and 44 lb⋅ft) at 5500 or 6200 rpm respectively. These engines were largely unchanged throughout the second generation Today's production run.

Both engines were available with either a five-speed manual or a three-speed automatic transmission. All-wheel drive (using Honda's Realtime 4WD technology) was available only in the Qi trim level; unlike in the first generation Today, four-wheel drive was also available with an automatic transmission. Similarly to the first-generation Today, front-wheel drive models had a coil-sprung rear beam axle located by two trailing arms and a Panhard rod (though the first generation used a torsion beam rear axle), while four-wheel-drive versions had independently sprung rear wheels using struts.

The base model was originally called the Mi, with a better-equipped Pochette available with two doors only. The corresponding Gi trim was only offered on the Associe. Qi was the four-wheel-drive version, and the Xi was the sportiest model, using the MTREC engine. In March 1994, the base model was renamed Ji and three-point rear seat belts were made standard fitment. Until 1996, Today buyers could specify traditional Japanese fender-mounted mirrors on the base Mi and Ji models, a feature that was still popular with professional drivers at the time.

For the February 1996 facelift, Honda replaced the unconventional tailgate with a traditional hatchback door. This necessitated a thorough redesign of the rear end (resulting in a look very similar to that of the Honda Logo, which appeared a few months later), because the rear window had originally wrapped around to the sides. The option of a driver's side airbag was now available across the range, whereas before it had only been offered on select models. The five-door arrived one month after the three-door and was now simply called "Today", forgoing the "Associe" name. The front was also reworked with a thin grille and different bumpers. The chassis numbers remained JA4 and JA5 (FF/4WD). Reflecting changing market conditions, the five-door Today was no longer available with the more powerful MTREC engine, as buyers tended to appreciate more economic models.

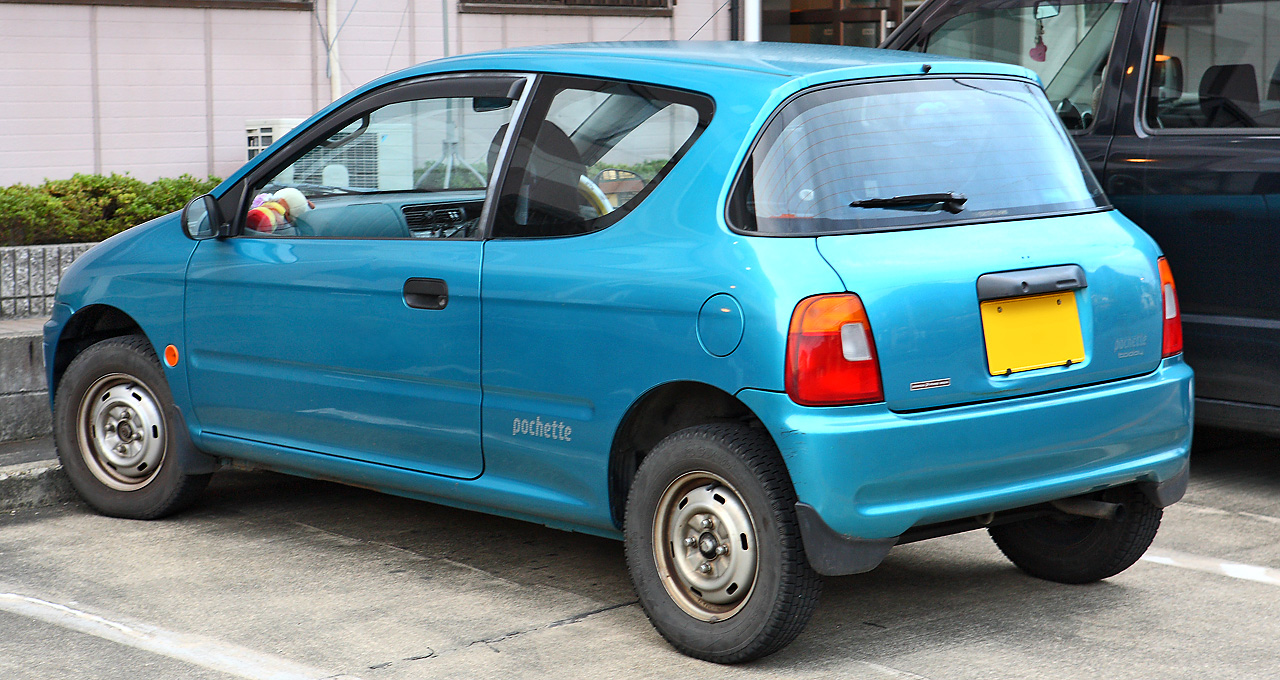
Honda Today Pochette 2-door (pre-facelift, rear)

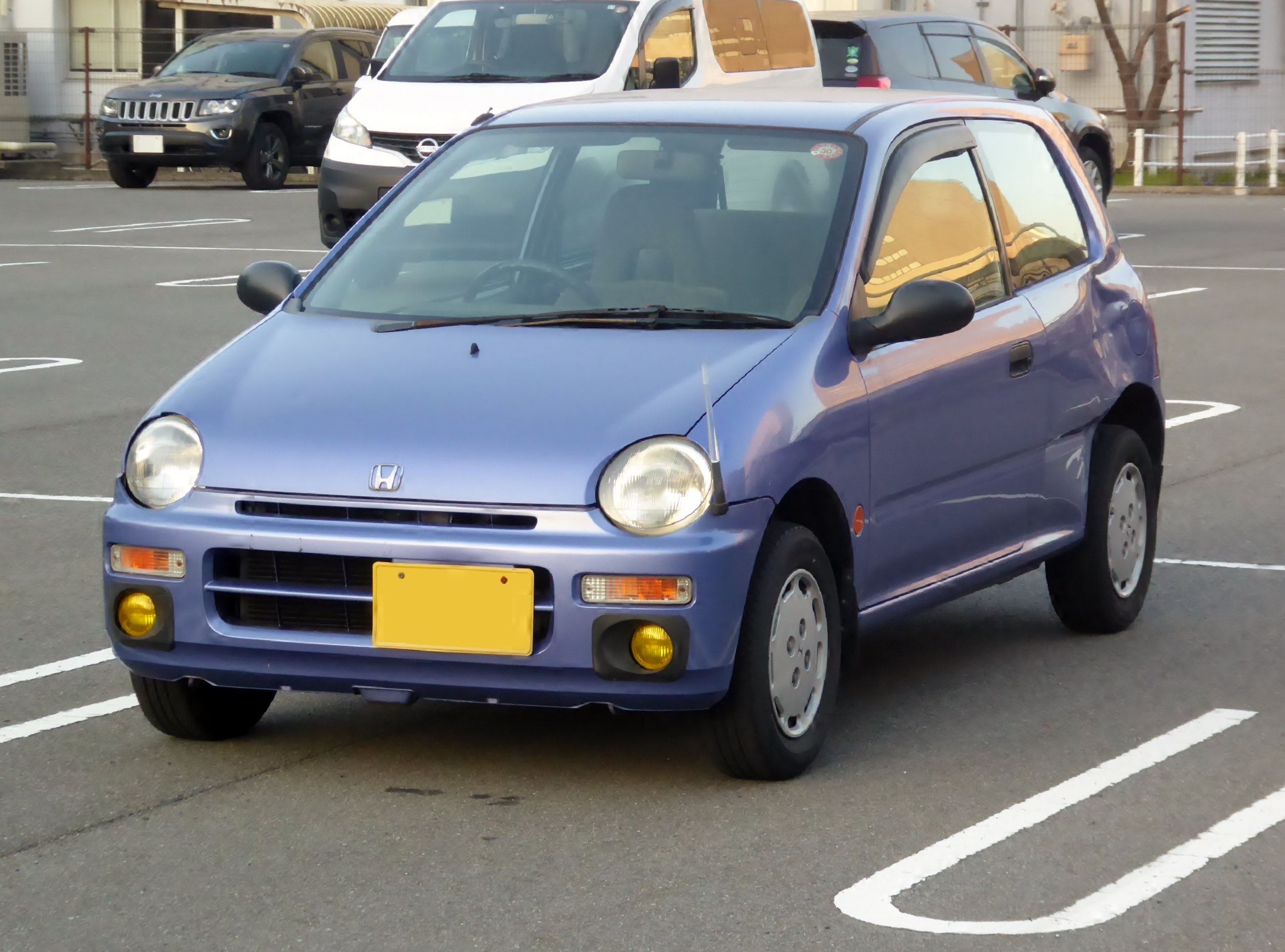
Facelift 3-door Today Gs

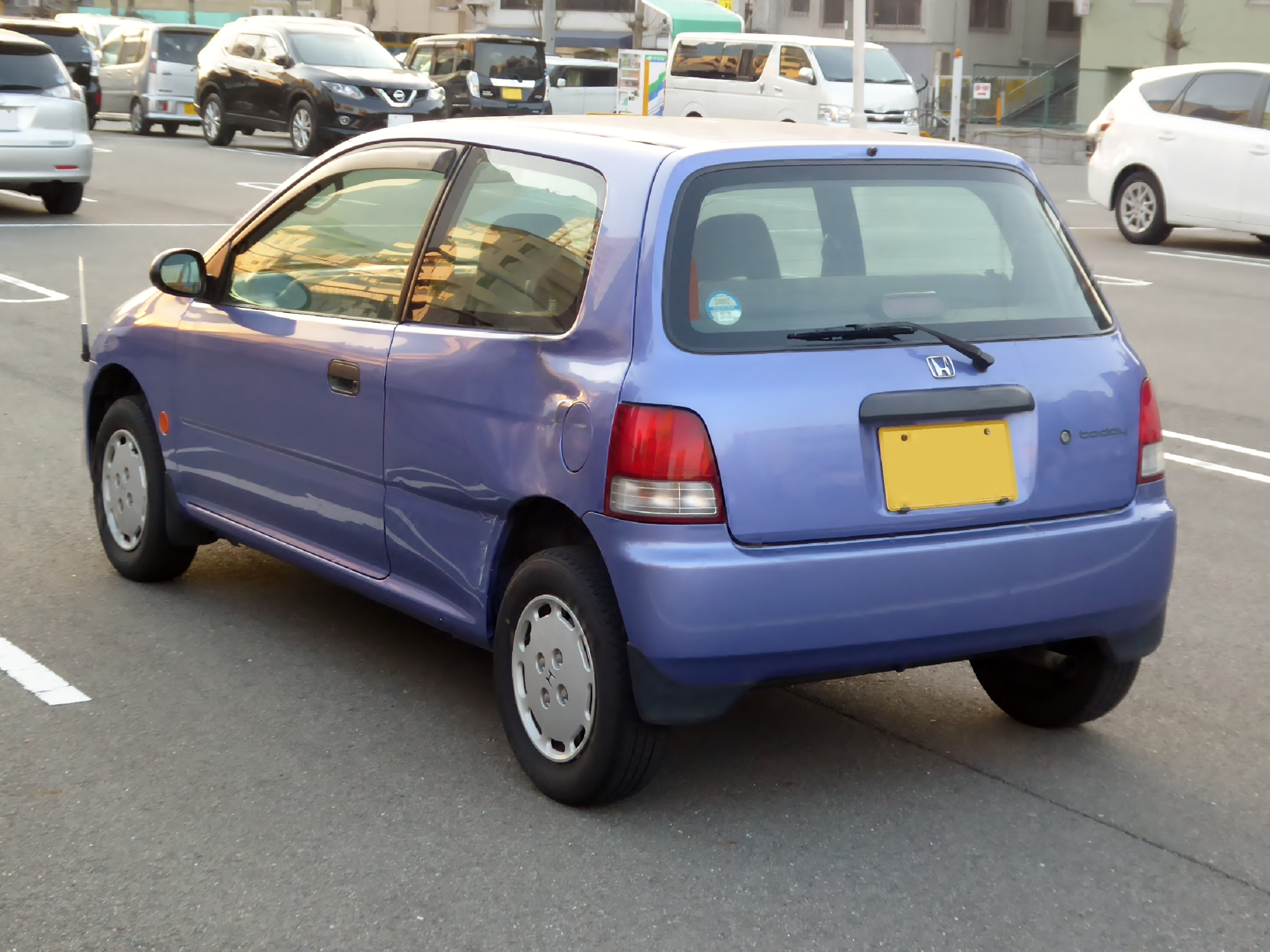
Facelift 3-door Today Gs

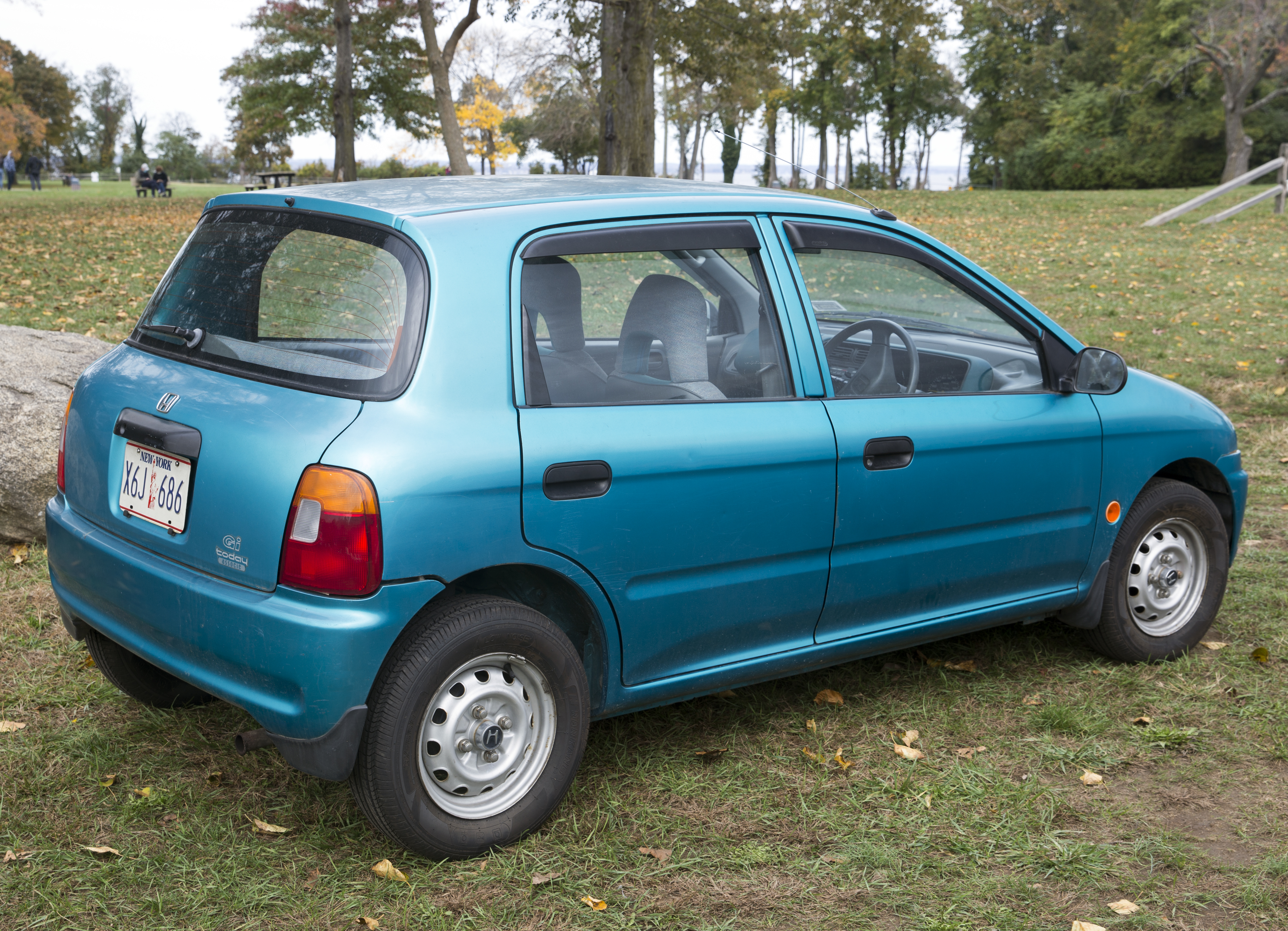
Honda Today Associe Gi (4-door, pre-facelift, rear)

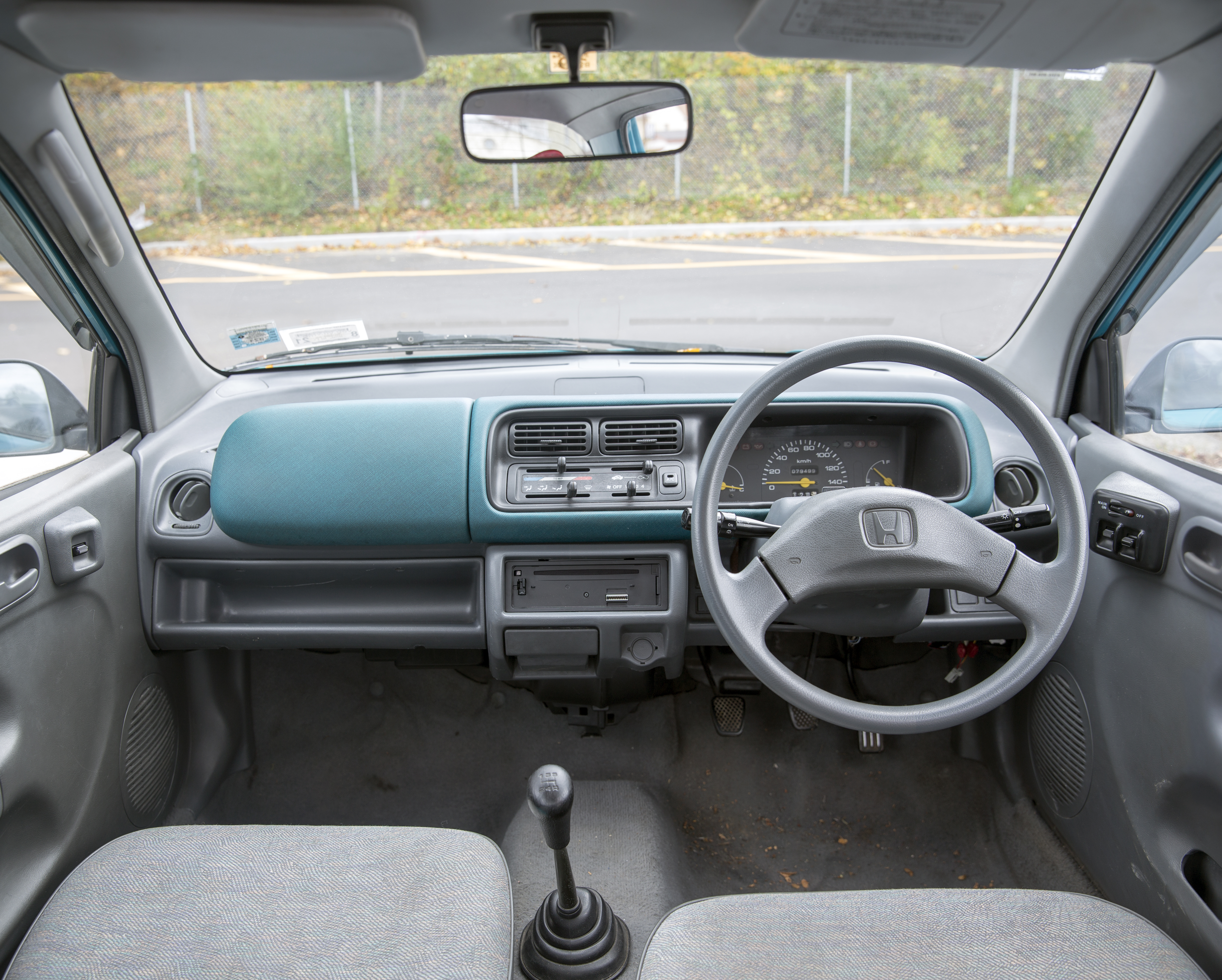
Dashboard of pre-facelift Today Associe

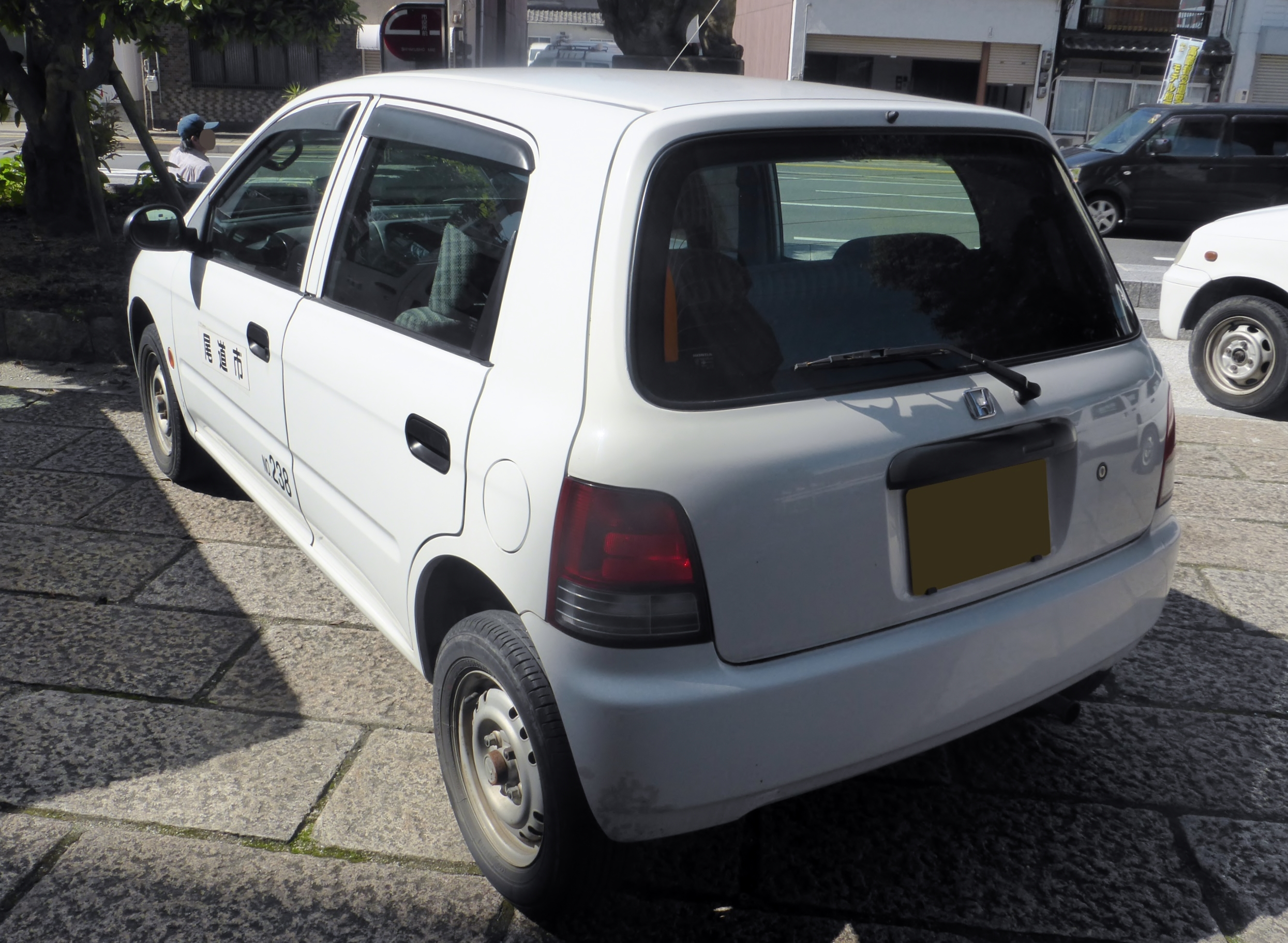
The facelifted 5-door received a proper rear hatch (Qi 4WD version)

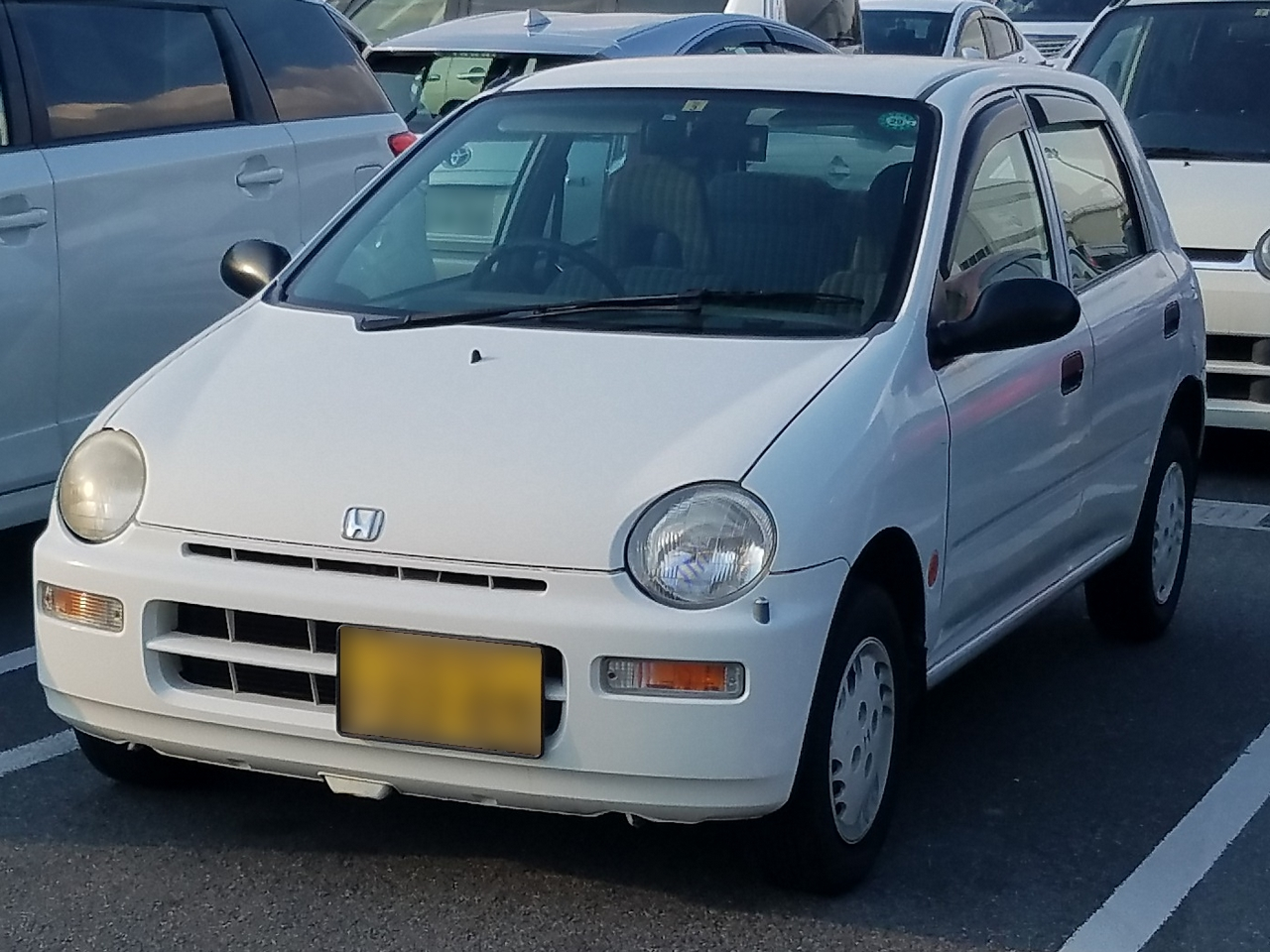
Facelift Today Gf 5-door

=== Discontinuation ===
In light of the Suzuki Wagon R's success, Honda decided to introduce a modern version of its 1970s Honda Life "StepVan" microvan, and reintroduced the Life model name in 1997. When kei car regulations changed in October 1998, necessitating a redesign, the "tallboy" Life was updated, while the Today, a modern interpretation of the first Honda Life three-door hatchback, was discontinued.
