= Honda Acty =

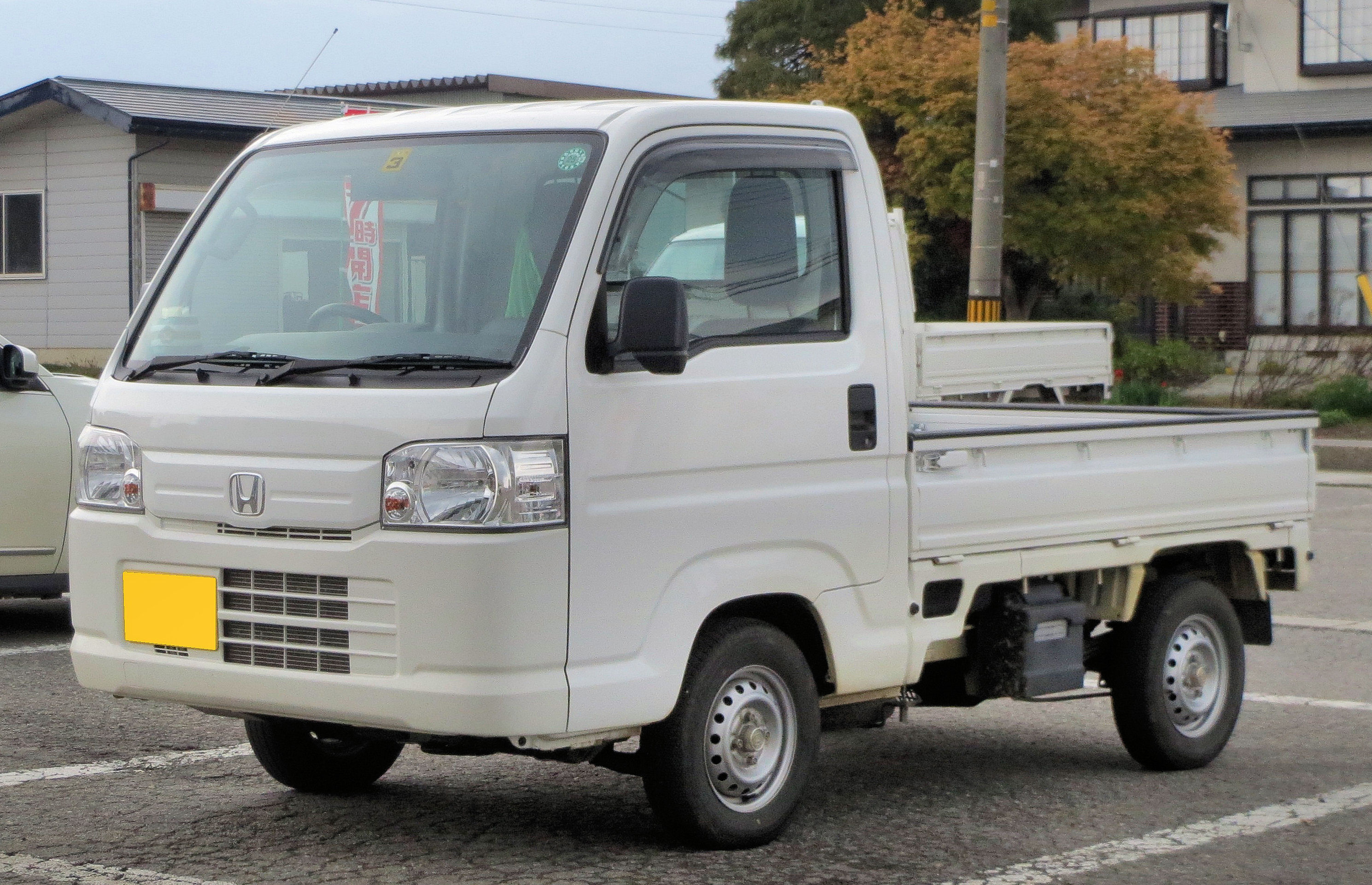

Overview
- Manufacturer: Honda
- Production: 1977–2021
- Assembly: Japan: Suzuka Plant, Suzuka, Mie; Yachiyo Plant, Yokkaichi, Mie (starting 1985)

Body and chassis
- Class: Kei truck Microvan
- Body style: 2-door pickup truck 5-door van
- Layout: Mid-engine, rear-wheel drive / four-wheel drive.
- Related: Honda Vamos

Chronology
- Predecessor: Honda TN7 (truck); Honda Life (van)
- Successor: Honda N-Van (van)

The Honda Acty (Japanese: ホンダ・アクティ, Hepburn: Honda Akuti) is a series of cabover microvans and kei trucks produced by the Japanese automaker Honda from 1977 to 2021, designed for the Japanese domestic market (JDM). "Acty" is short for "Activity".

The Acty's primary competitors were the Subaru Sambar, Suzuki Carry/Every, Daihatsu Hijet, Mazda Scrum, Nissan NT100/NV100 Clipper and the Mitsubishi Minicab.

== History ==
The Acty range is designed to be economical, agile work vehicles, and generally lack luxury options, although air conditioning and power steering are available along with various trim, decoration, and customization options. The first generation was produced from 1977 to 1988 (model series TA, TB, TC, VD, VH). The second generation truck's years were 1988-1999 (model series HA1, HA2, HH1, HH2 with the E05A engine; HA3, HA4, HA5, HH3, HH4 with the EN07A engine) - the Street derivative continued in production until 2011.

The third generation's years were 1999-2009 (model series HA6, HA7, HH5, and HH6, with the E07Z engine) with the van remaining in production until April 2021. The fourth generation was introduced, as a truck only, at the 41st Tokyo Motor Show in 2009 on December 17, showing the HA8 series and continuing to use the E07Z engine. With the merger of the Subaru Sambar and Daihatsu Hijet, the Acty truck became the final Kei truck not to have a front-engine, rear-wheel-drive layout.

== First generation ==
First generation
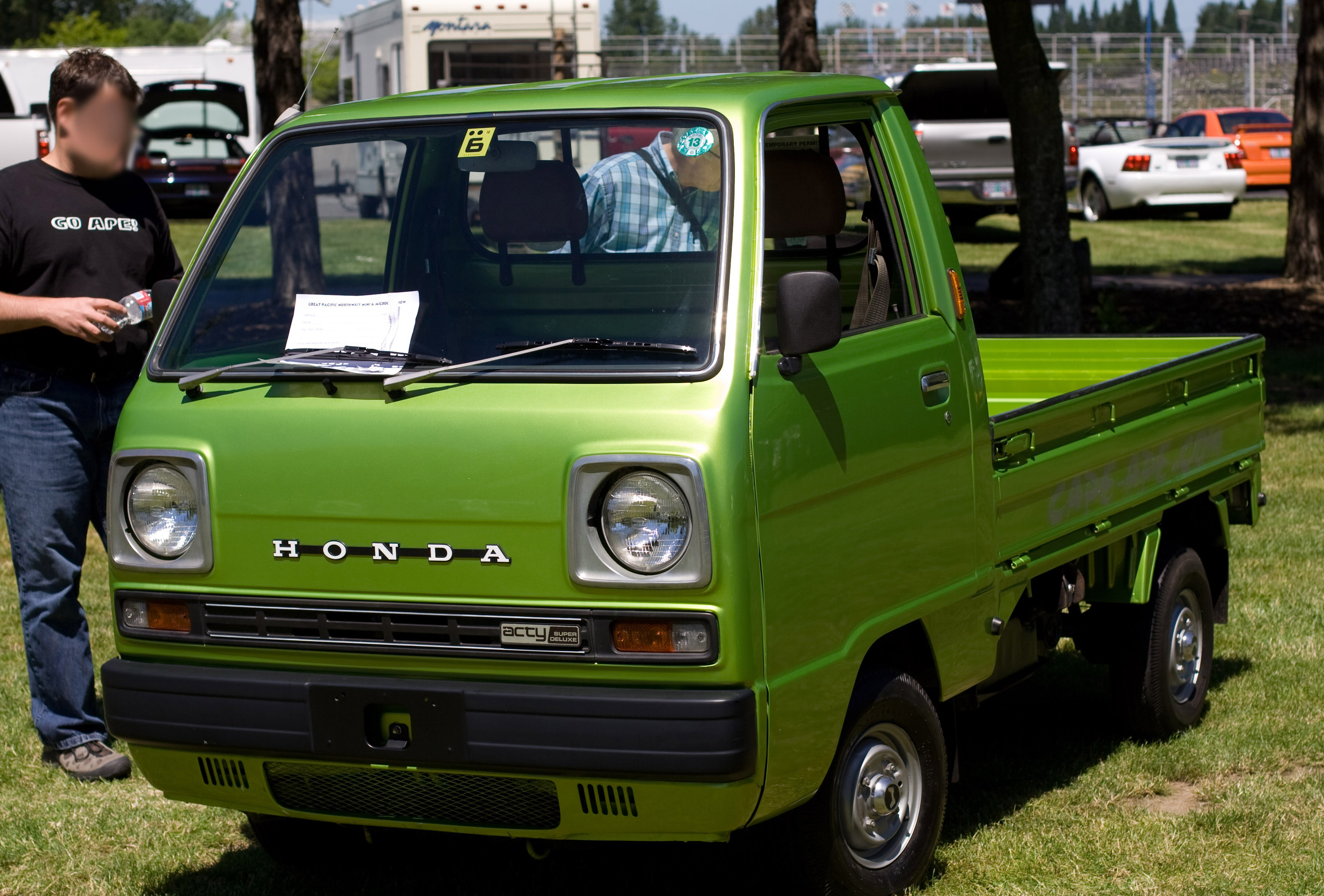
- Pre-facelift Acty truck

Overview
- Also called: Honda Street
- Production: July 1977–1988

Powertrain
- Engine: 545 cc EH SOHC 2-cylinder
- Transmission: 4/5-speed manual; 3-speed Hondamatic

Dimensions
- Wheelbase: 1,850 mm (72.8 in)
- Length: 3,195 mm (125.8 in)
- Width: 1,395 mm (54.9 in)
- Height: 1,660 mm (65.4 in); 1,745–1,895 mm (68.7–74.6 in) (van)
- Curb weight: 590 kg (1,301 lb) (truck)

The first Acty trucks were introduced July 27, 1977, and replaced several keitoras Honda had previously offered, such as the Honda TN360 (most recently sold as the TN7) and the Honda T360. On 1 September 1975, the Japanese Government revised the rules on Road Trucking Vehicle Law that regulated the dimensions and engine size of vehicles in this class. As a result, the first Acty trucks and vans were available with a "midship" mounted 545 cc 2-cylinder SOHC water-cooled engine, known as the EH engine, which produces 28 PS (20.6 kW; 27.6 hp) at 5500 rpm and 4.2 kg⋅m (41 N⋅m; 30 lb⋅ft) of torque at 4000 rpm. This was about 50% larger than the engine used in the preceding TN7. Export models, with less emissions equipment, claim 30.6 hp (22.8 kW; 31.0 PS) at the same engine speed.

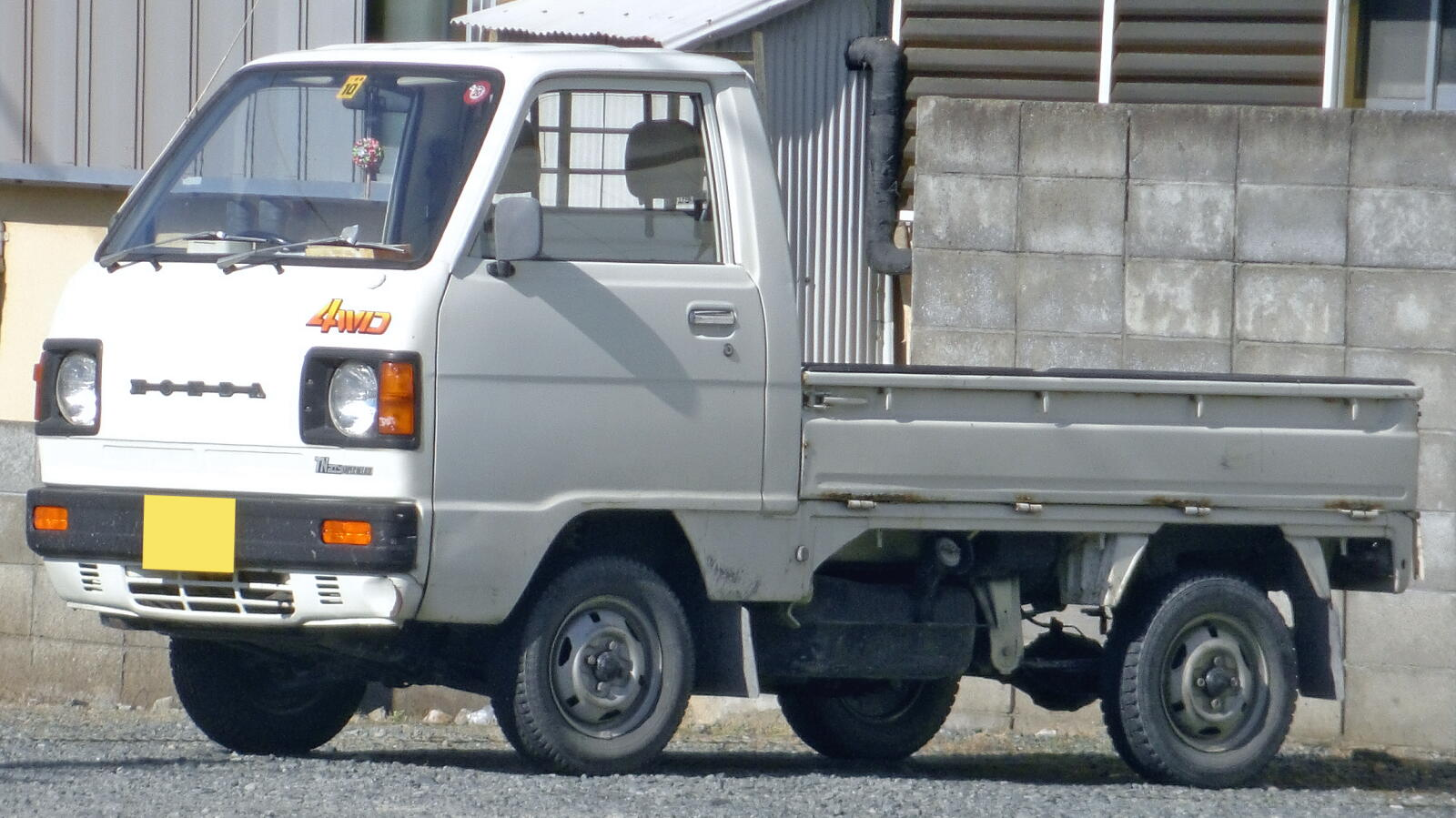
1983 Acty (second facelift)

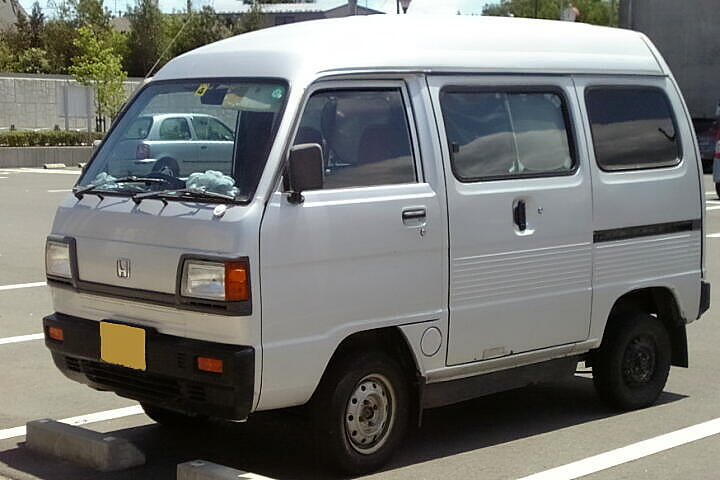
1985 Honda Street (late 1st gen)

The van was introduced November 1979, although a truck-based panel van with a boxy rear was available from the beginning (TB). To save money, the van uses the same taillights as the truck and also has side doors with center mounted handles, meaning that the same pressing can be used for either side of the car. The Acty was exported to a number of markets, including Great Britain, where it is considered to have created an entire new category. The Suzuki Carry/Bedford Rascal was GM's response to the Acty in the British market.

An upper trim level of the Acty van intended mainly for passenger usage went on sale 1 February 1981 and was called the Honda Street (in Japanese); it was produced for two generations of the Acty van. Available with a standard or an all-new high roof design, the high roof was also made available for the Acty van (SDX only). The name was discontinued in 2001 after the Honda Vamos name had been reintroduced as a replacement trim level for the Street, on a shared platform of the Acty van.

In March 1983 the four-wheel drive Acty/Street was added. This model receives 12-inch wheels for increased ground clearance and has an engine with an improved cylinder head, increasing power to 29 PS (21.3 kW; 28.6 hp) at 5300 rpm and torque to 4.5 kg⋅m (44 N⋅m; 33 lb⋅ft) at 3500 rpm. This was also the first Acty/Street to receive a five-speed manual gearbox, initially only available on the 4WD models. A larger, 35 L (9.2 US gal) was also part of the 4WD's equipment.

In June 1982, the series received a facelift, with wraparound turn signals. At this time the Hondamatic version was added, as was the "Big Cab" version, with a passenger compartment stretched by 100 mm (4 in). While the Acty has round headlamps, the Street received square units after the facelift. Starting with model year 1985, the Acty/Street was exclusive to a chain of Japanese Honda dealerships established for small and commercial vehicles, called Honda Primo.

=== Export versions ===
The first generation Acty was also sold in a few export markets, such as the United Kingdom and Australia. Subsequent models were marketed almost entirely in the Japanese domestic market only. As a bit of an oddity, the Acty was sold during 1982 in Australia, but was made unavailable inside of Sydney due to concerns by Honda that the vehicle was underpowered for the hilly terrain.

== Second generation (HA/HH) ==
Second generation
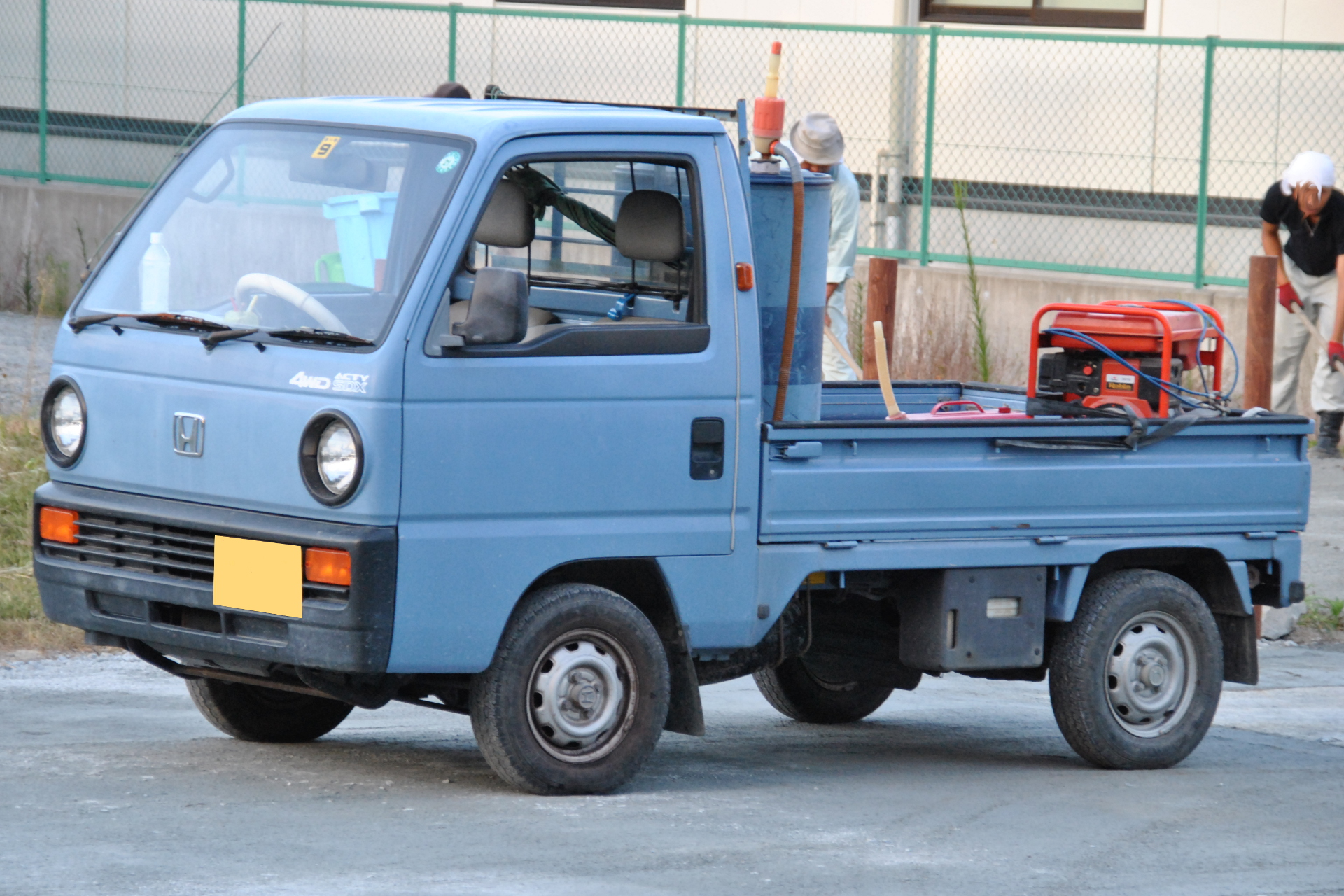
- Acty Truck (1988-1990)

Overview
- Model code: HA1/2/3/4/5; HH1/2/3/4
- Also called: Honda Street (passenger car)
- Production: May 1988–May 1999 (Acty); May 1988–September 2001 (Street)

Powertrain
- Engine: 547 cc E05A SOHC I3; 656 cc E07A SOHC I3
- Transmission: 4/5-speed manual; 3-speed automatic

Dimensions
- Wheelbase: 1,900 mm (74.8 in)
- Length: 3,195–3,295 mm (125.8–129.7 in)
- Width: 1,395 mm (54.9 in)
- Height: 1,700–1,750 mm (66.9–68.9 in) (truck); 1,870 mm (73.6 in) (van)
- Curb weight: 670–870 kg (1,477–1,918 lb)

The second generation Acty was launched in May 1988 with the introduction of the Honda E05 engine, with an additional cylinder added, making it a 547 cc 3-cylinder with SOHC. The engine is rated 34 PS (25 kW) at 5500 rpm and 4.5 kg⋅m (44 N⋅m; 33 lb⋅ft) of torque at 5,000 rpm. The first models were the Acty truck and van, with the commercial grade Acty van appearing a month later. The 4WD models (HA2, HA4 after the 1990 facelift) were no longer available with an automatic transmission. There was also an "Acty Attack" version of the truck, intended for farmers in particular this model has a differential lock in the rear and features Ultra-Low forward and reverse gears (UL/UR). The other models of STD, SDX, SDX2, FD and TOWN had slight variations with the TOWN and SDX2 adding a color coded (white) bumper and side mirrors along with a tachometer. The FD featured a refrigerated box truck setup. The TOWN features tweed seats with a brown interior (as opposed to "vinyl" like seats on STD models). The only other notable options were a light for rear work area and radio.

The original Actys have distinct round headlights (known as “round-eye”) while the Street Van has large, rectangular headlamps. After a thorough March 1990 update to meet altered kei car regulations the Acty Truck received the same headlights as the Street Van, while all models grew longer by 10 cm (3.9 in). At this time the Street also received the taillights from the contemporary Honda Today (which were also used for the third generation Acty van). The 1990 changeover also meant that the 547 cc engine was replaced with the larger 656 cc Honda E07A engine (with fuel injection added in 1996). The carburetted version of this engine produced 38 PS (28 kW) at 5,300 rpm and 5.5 kg⋅m (54 N⋅m; 40 lb⋅ft) of torque at 4,500 rpm. The Street could reach a top speed of 115 km/h (71 mph), while the four-wheel drive version only could attain 105 km/h (65 mph). Trucks received the HA3/HA4 chassis numbers depending on whether they are two- or four-wheel drive, while vans/Streets are called HH3/HH4.

In October 1993, the Honda Street and Acty's front design was changed yet again, receiving larger, more square headlamp units with one chamfered corner. A PGM-FI version in "Fox" and "Xi" equipment levels was also introduced to the Street at this time. This version produces 44 PS (32 kW; 43 hp). The front end changes were applied to the Acty as well, beginning in January 1994. The Acty Crawler (HA5), with treads mounted on tandem axles replacing the rear wheels, was released in January 1994 and remained in production for special order until 1999.

The Acty and the Street were further modified in January 1996 when the front turn signals were changed from amber to clear. At this time, the fuel injected Acty SDX-Hi was also introduced - only with two-wheel drive and a five-speed manual - with the same engine as the Street Xi (the Fox was dropped, replaced by the carburetted Street V). Production of the Acty continued until the arrival of the third generation in 1999, although the Honda Street continued to be built until 2001 as it was only partially replaced by the pricier Honda Vamos.

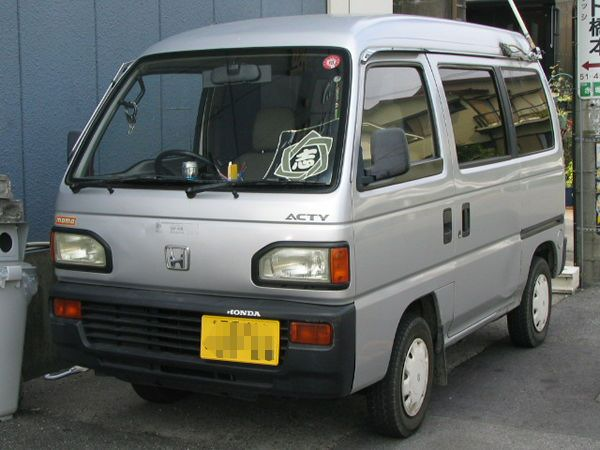
1992 Honda Acty van (first facelift)

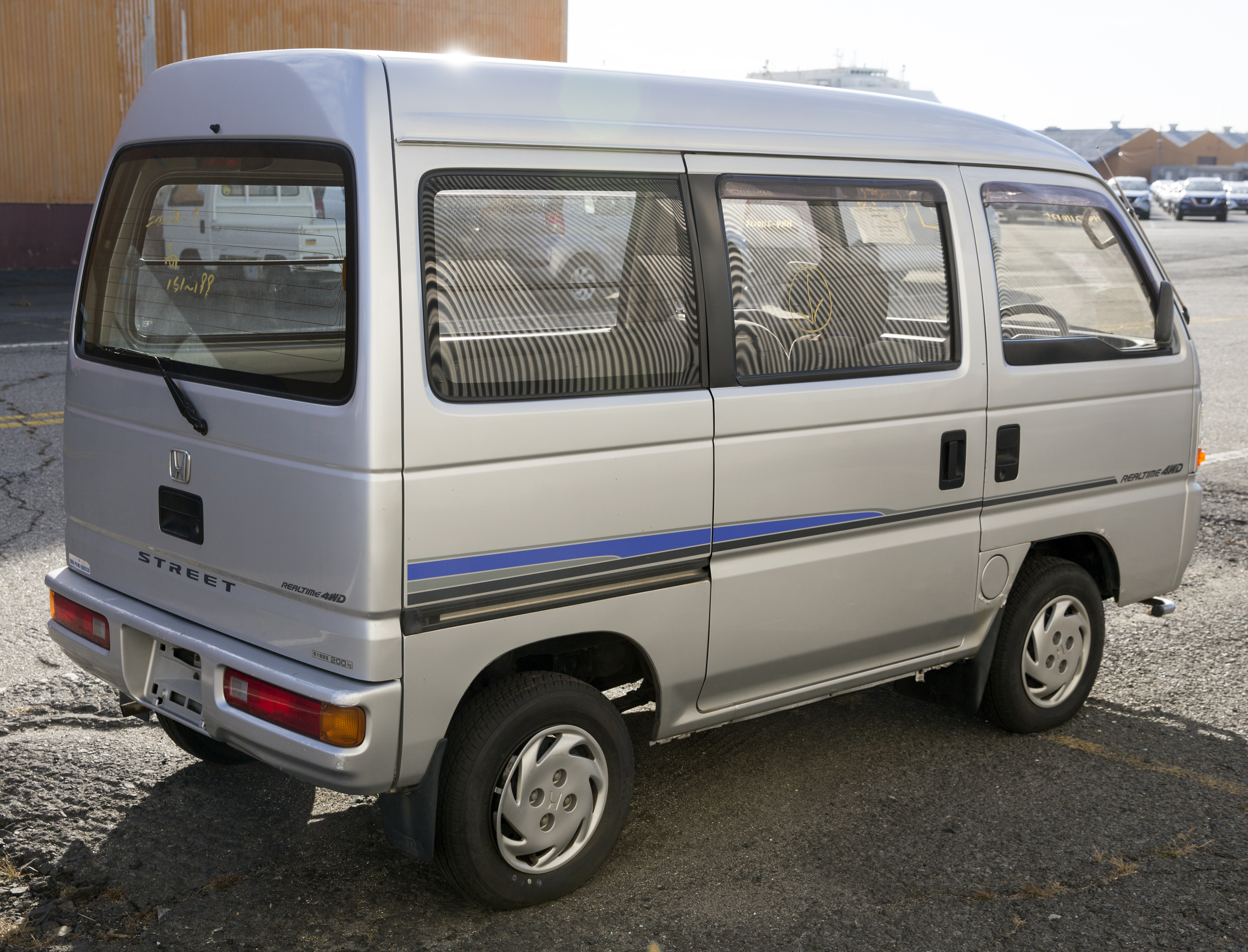
Rear of 1994 Honda Street G 4WD (second facelift), showing the taillights it shares with the Honda Today

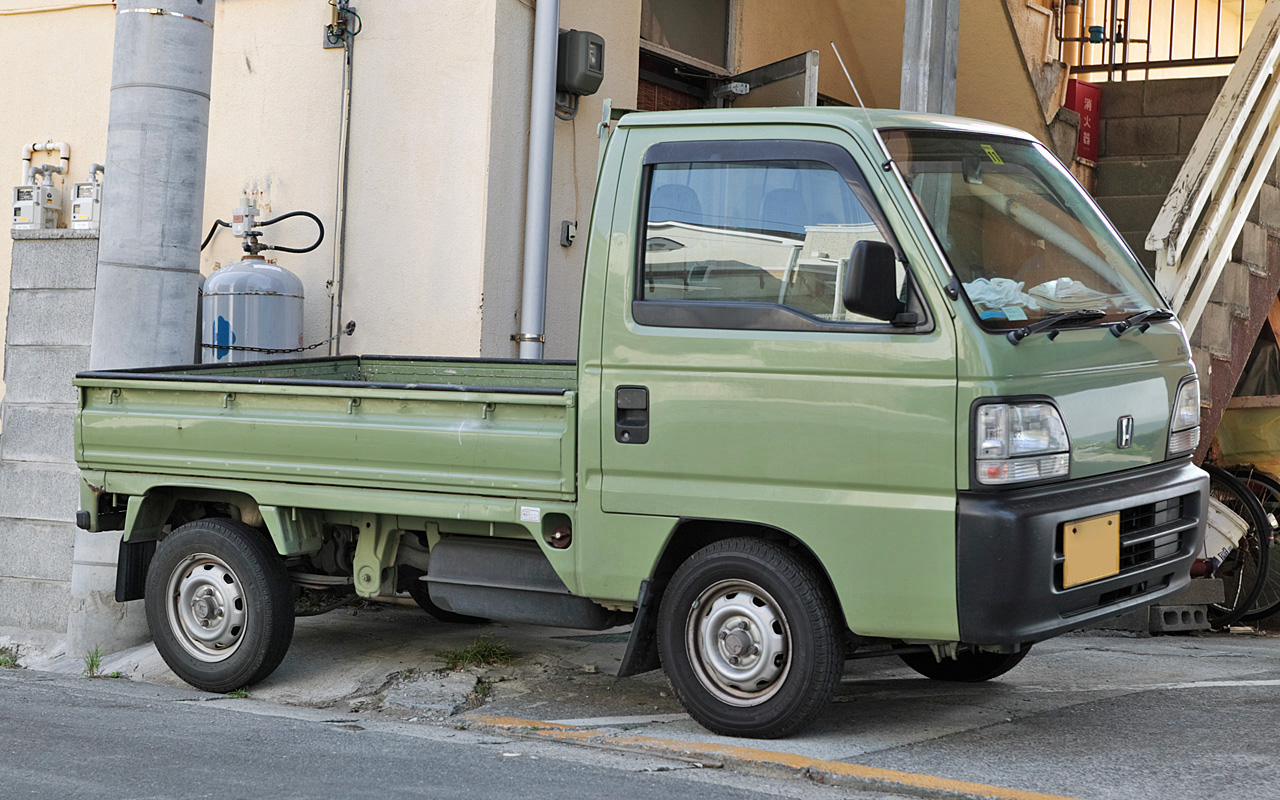
Post-1996 Honda Acty truck (final facelift)

== Third generation ==
Third generation
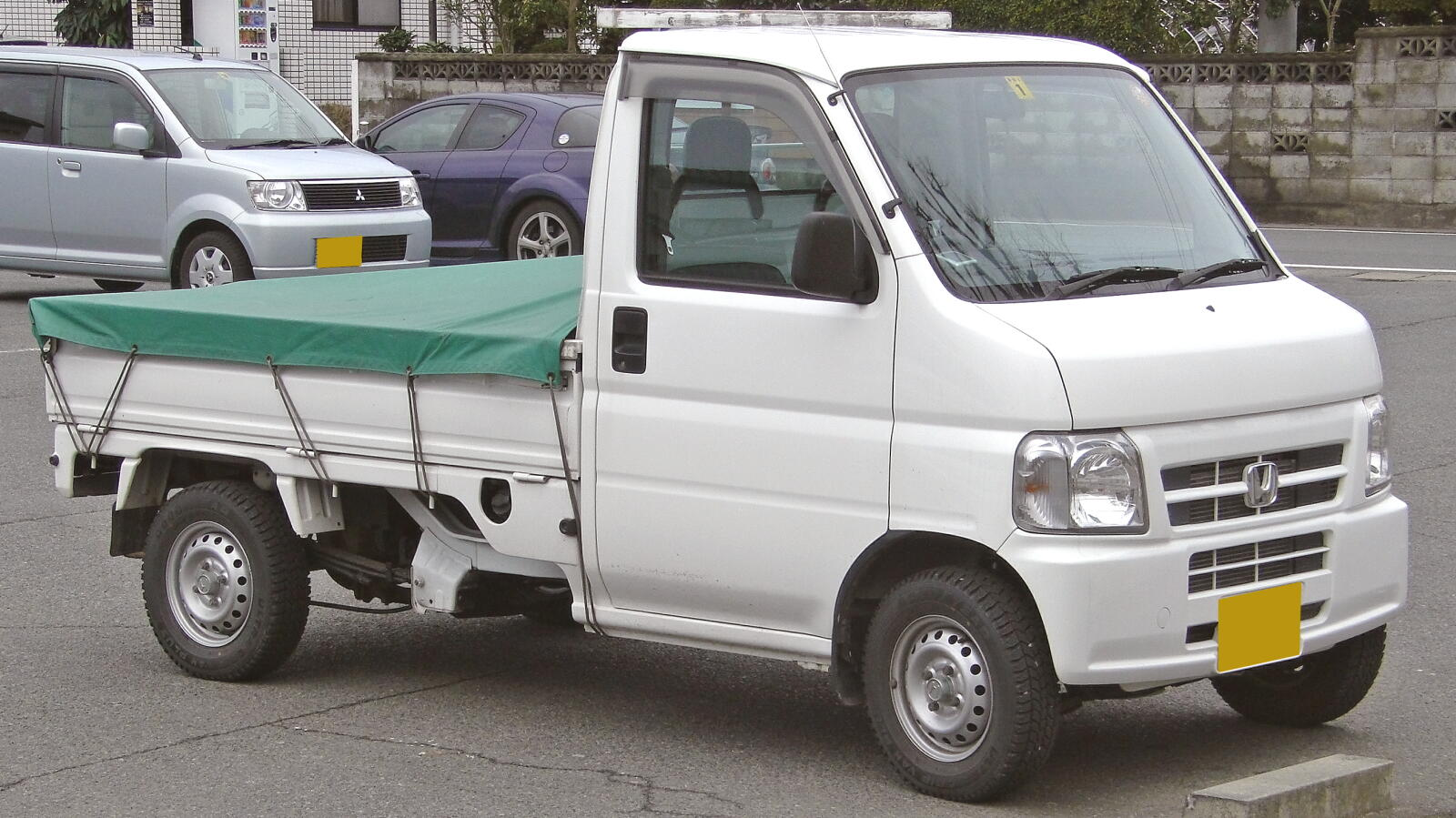

Overview
- Production: May 1999–December 2009; June 1999–April 2018 (Van)

Body and chassis
- Related: Honda Vamos

Powertrain
- Engine: 656 cc E07Z SOHC I3
- Transmission: 5-speed manual; 3/4-speed automatic

Dimensions
- Wheelbase: 2,420 mm (95.3 in)
- Length: 3,395 mm (133.7 in)
- Width: 1,475 mm (58.1 in)
- Height: 1,745 mm (68.7 in) (truck); 1,880 mm (74.0 in) (van)
- Curb weight: 800–1,030 kg (1,764–2,271 lb)

Chronology
- Successor: Honda N-Van

The third generation Acty truck was introduced on 27 May 1999. The van went on sale one month later. On September 30, 1996, the Japanese Government amended the Enforcement Regulations Vehicle Law, Ministerial Ordinance No. 53, which addressed safety requirements for front passengers, but did not allow for larger overall dimensions. Honda pushed the driving position back while keeping the engine in its traditional location underneath the vehicle. The new design retained the mid-engined, rear-wheel-drive layout although it was now of a "semi-bonneted" design. Meeting the increased safety requirements was a major focus during development, and airbags were added as part of that focus. The base price of the pickup model is ¥777,000 (approximately $7,920 USD), with the van starting at ¥1,060,500 (approximately US$10,810) as of December 2008. Four-wheel drive is available as an option on all vans, and all but one model of pickup truck, making the Acty one of a handful of mid-engine, AWD vehicles that are not designed as supercars.

The 656 cc engine is of an LEV design, with low emissions and high gas mileage. Fuel economy was further increased by the use of electric power steering. Max power in 1999 was 46 PS (34 kW; 45 hp) at 5,000 rpm. The engine was since upgraded to the current 660 cc 12-valve inline-three E07Z gasoline engine making 53 PS (39 kW; 52 hp) at 7,000 rpm and 6.2 kg⋅m (61 N⋅m; 45 lb⋅ft) of torque at 4,000 rpm (4WD models). Currently, the maximum payload is 200 kg (440 lb). The truck was available as a basic standard model, SDX (Super Deluxe) and more comfortable Town versions. There was also the Acty Attack, a spartanly equipped four-wheel drive version with a differential lock, particularly intended for farmers. The van was available as a two-seater Pro-B (with division) or as the somewhat more comfortable Pro-A. There were also four-seater SDX and Town versions. The Acty van (and the related Vamos Hobio) kept using the taillights of the 1988 facelift version of the Honda Today.

The "Street" name was discontinued in favor of the Honda Vamos, based on the Acty van. In December 2009, the Acty truck was replaced by the new fourth generation model, but the bonneted Acty van continued to be produced with the third generation bodywork. On 12 July 2018, the Acty van was discontinued and it was replaced by the N-Van.

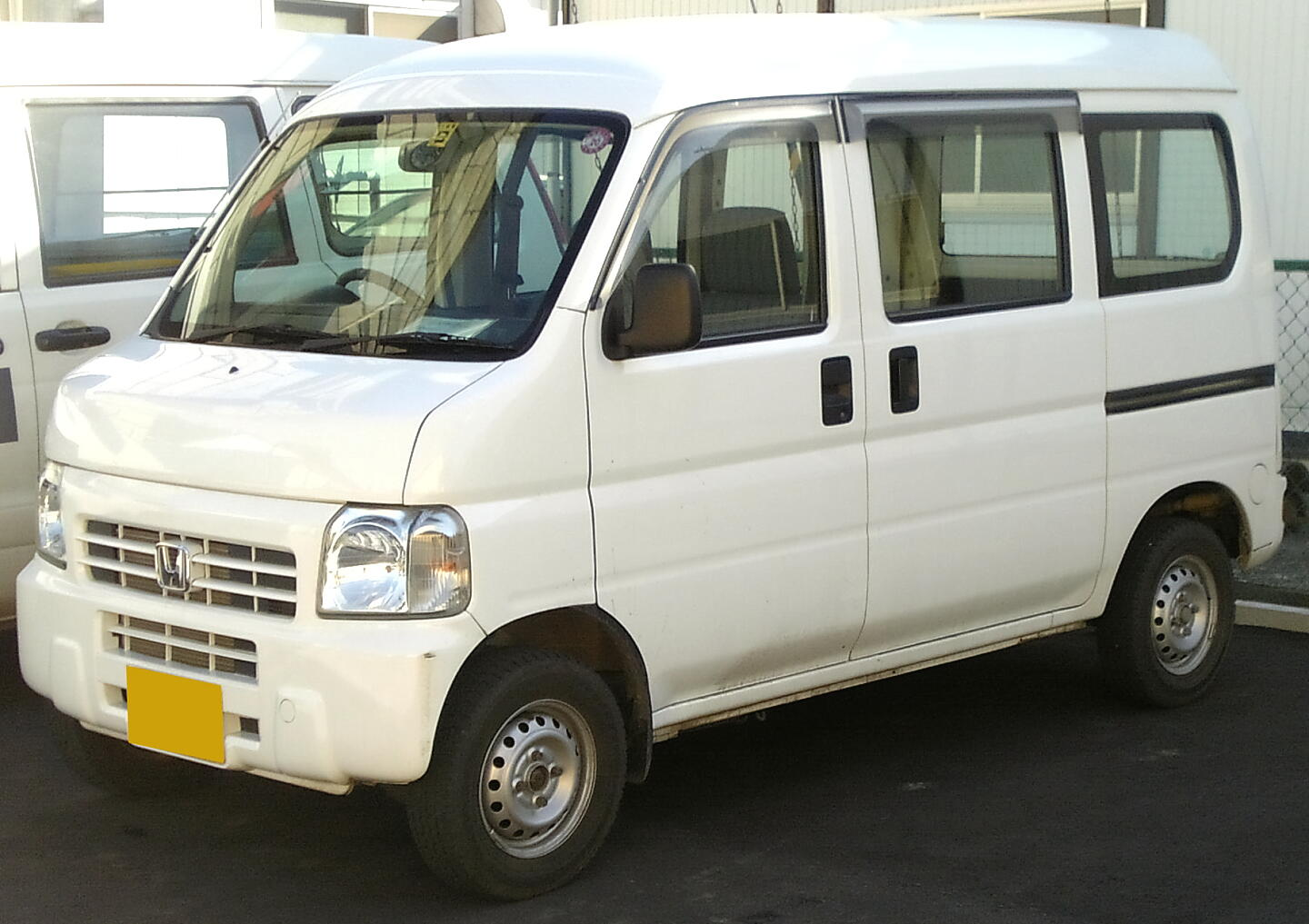
1999 Honda Acty van (3rd generation)

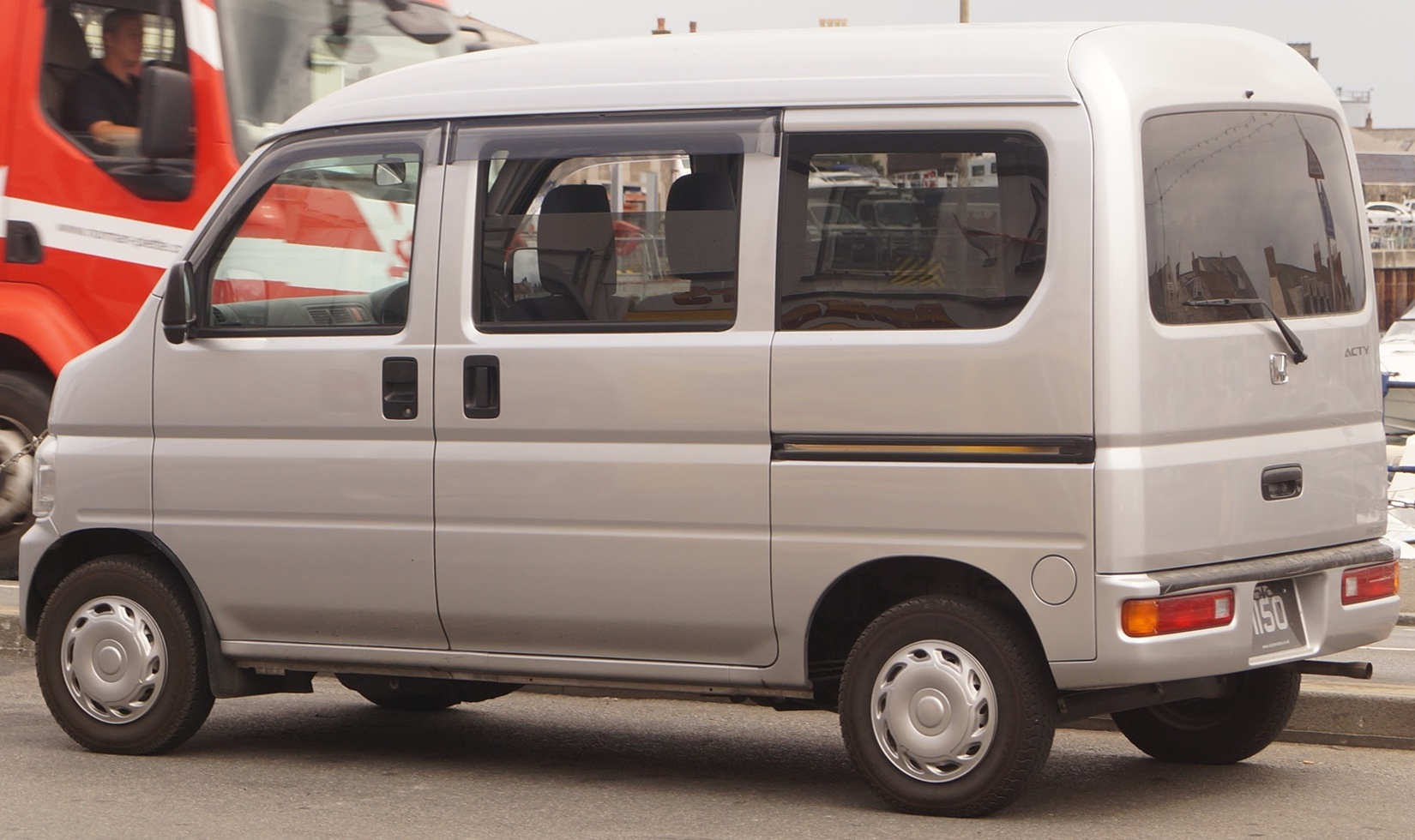
Honda Acty van rear view

== Fourth generation (HA8/9) ==
Fourth Generation
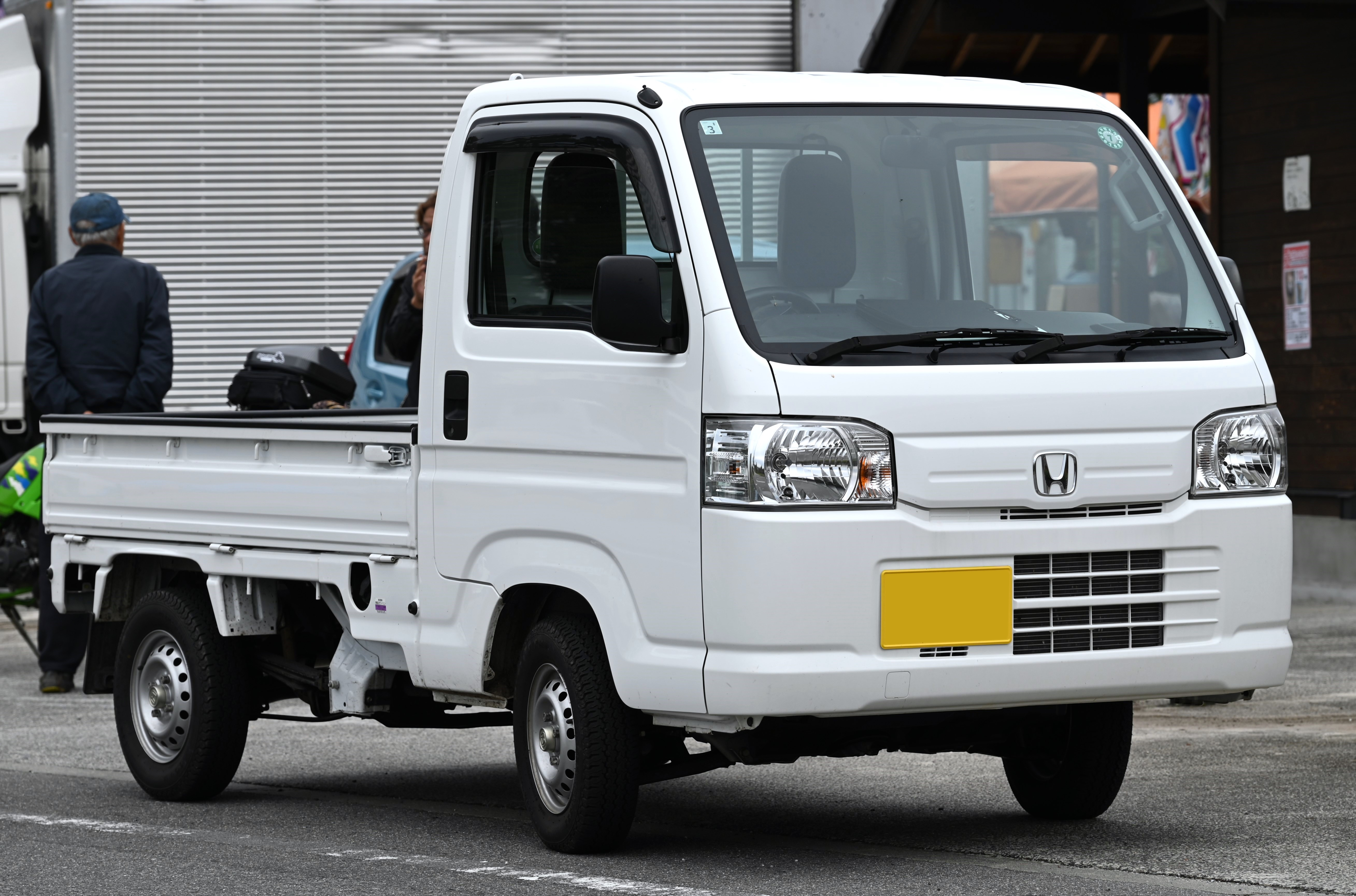

Overview
- Model code: HA8 (2WD); HA9 (4WD)
- Production: December 2009–April 2021

Body and chassis
- Body style: 2-door pickup truck

Powertrain
- Engine: 658 cc E07Z I3
- Transmission: 5-speed manual; 3-speed automatic

Dimensions
- Wheelbase: 1,900 mm (75 in)
- Length: 3,395 mm (134 in)
- Width: 1,475 mm (58 in)
- Height: 1,735–1,745 mm (68–69 in)
- Curb weight: 770–820 kg (1,698–1,808 lb)

On 17 December 2009, the fourth generation Acty truck was introduced. It continues to use the predecessor and van's E07Z engine, although now with 45 PS (33 kW; 44 hp). The chassis codes are HA8 (2WD) or HA9 (4WD). The wheelbase was shortened dramatically, returning to the 1.9 m (6.2 ft) as used on the second generation Acty, in order to increase cabin space and to shrink the turning circle. In June 2012, the Acty underwent some light modifications so as to meet new upcoming standards on lighting.

As for the Daihatsu Hijet and Suzuki Carry competitors, the fourth generation Acty was not available in a van variant, as a result of differing safety requirements for commercial vehicles and passenger-type vans. Honda instead continued to produce the existing third-generation Acty Van and its passenger-oriented sister car, the Vamos, until that line was discontinued in 2018.

In November 2018, Honda renewed the "Spirit Color Style", a special-purpose vehicle commemorating the 55th anniversary of T360, the origin of Honda four-wheeled vehicles, based on the Acty Town model. The main difference was that these were issued in one of two two-tone color schemes, either Bay Blue and White (hearkening back to the T360) or Red and Black (a reference to Honda Power products).

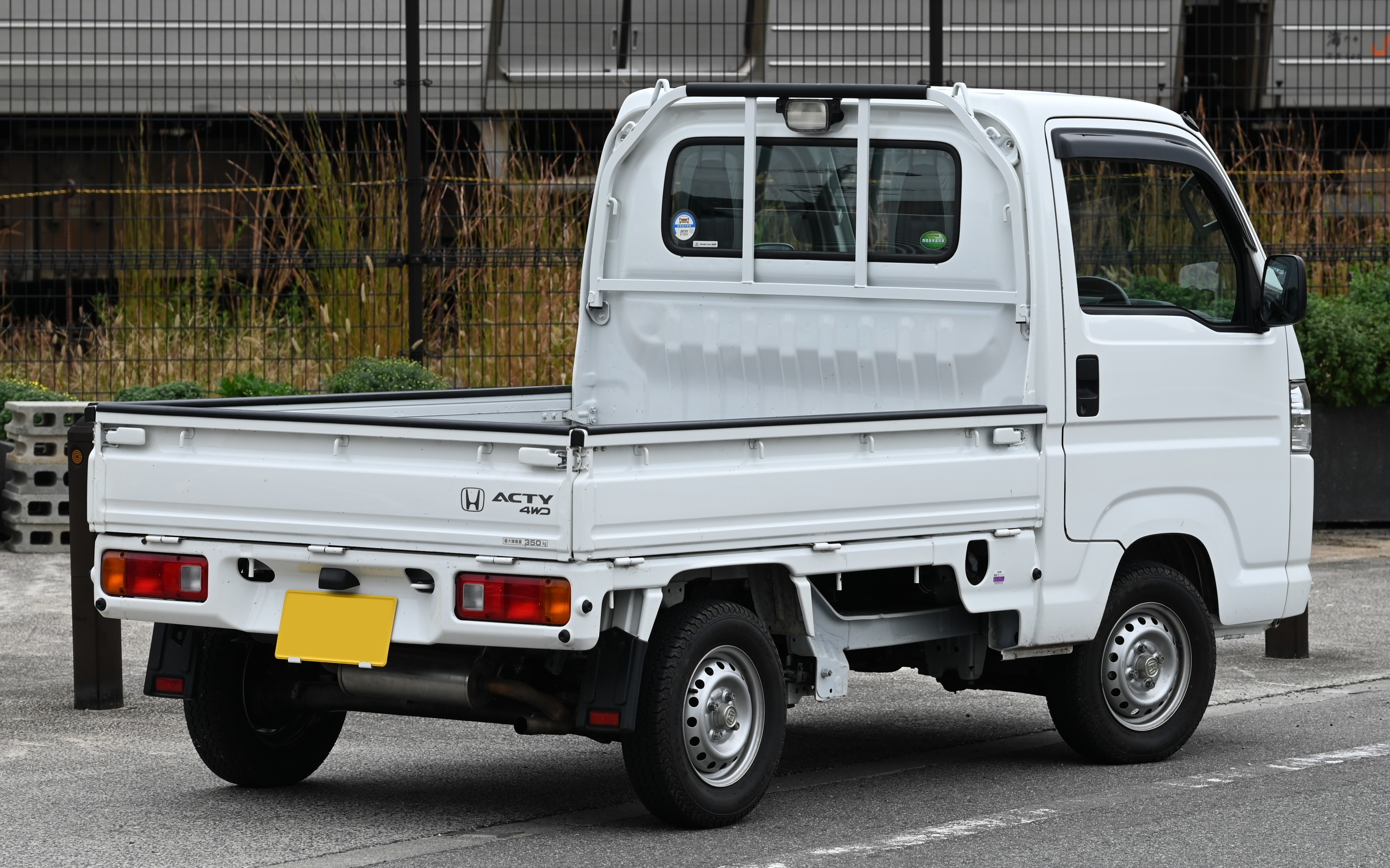
Rear view

== Discontinuation ==
The Acty ended production in April 2021 due to new emissions regulations and mandatory crash mitigation brakes that will be gradually required to be installed, thus increasing development costs.

== External link ==
- Honda Acty Truck webpage (archived, in Japanese)
- Honda Acty Van webpage (archived, in Japanese)
- ThisOldHonda.org Acty
- Honda Acty Talk and Information
