= Honda Vamos =

The Honda Vamos is a leisure vehicle originally produced by Japanese automaker Honda from 1970 to 1973, and reintroduced again as a trim level of the Honda Acty microvan starting in 1999. Its name, "Vamos", is Spanish and Portuguese for "let's go".

== 1970-1973 ==
Honda Vamos
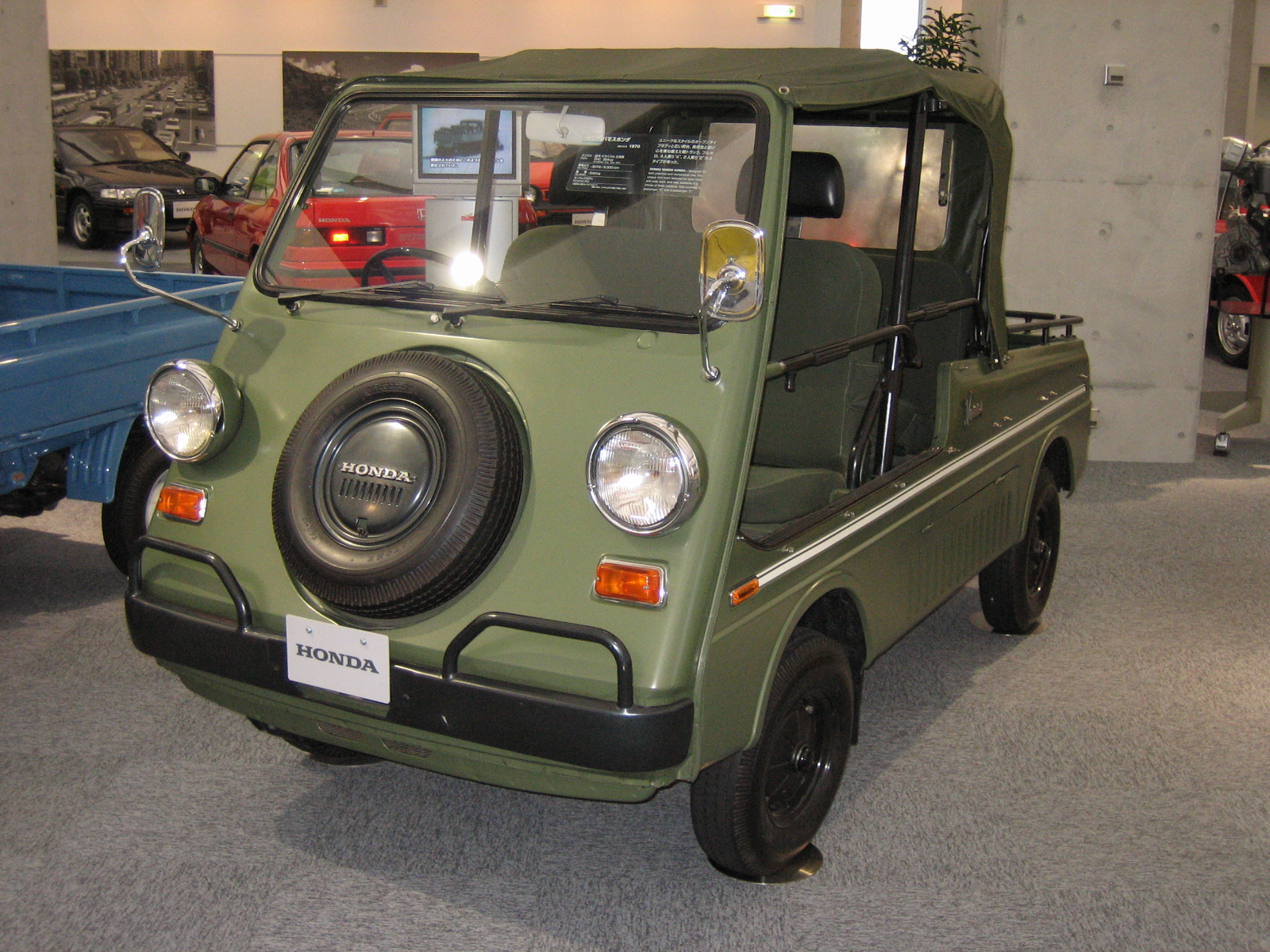

Overview
- Manufacturer: Honda
- Production: 1970–1973

Body and chassis
- Class: Kei truck
- Body style: 2-door jeep
- Layout: Front-mid engine, rear-wheel-drive
- Related: Honda TN360; Honda N360

Powertrain
- Engine: 354 cc I2
- Transmission: 4-speed manual

Dimensions
- Wheelbase: 1,780 mm (70.1 in)
- Length: 2,995 mm (117.9 in)
- Width: 1,295 mm (51.0 in)
- Height: 1,655 mm (65.2 in)
- Curb weight: 520 kg (1,146.4 lb)

Chronology
- Successor: Honda TN-7

Technically speaking a kei truck, the Vamos leisure vehicle was based on the Honda TN360. Introduced in November 1970, the Vamos used a 354 cc 2-cylinder, mid mounted, air-cooled, overhead camshaft gasoline engine shared with the Honda TN360, N360, and the Z360. Its official name was actually "Vamos Honda"; meaning "let's go, Honda" in Spanish. The Vamos was a competitor at the time to the Suzuki Jimny and the Daihatsu Fellow buggy. Honda had hoped the popularity of the Honda Dax minibike with its off-road image would be associated with the Vamos, and had planned on a monthly production rate of 2,000 units. Because of the installation of the spare tire on the front of the vehicle and the sound from the air-cooled engine, it had an appearance somewhat similar to the Volkswagen Type 2. There are no doors; instead, it offered swing-out guard rails to keep the occupants secure. The Vamos' open cabin design and lack of four-wheel drive combined to make it a slow seller.

The Vamos was available with an optional and removable rear seat, being marketed as the Vamos 2 or the Vamos 4 depending on its passenger capacity. It featured lap belts only for all passengers. The convertible top was easily and quickly removed as needed. Due to the open cab configuration, all instrumentation and switches were both water- and dust proof, while there was a locking glove compartment for a measure of secure storage. The Vamos used a MacPherson strut front suspension and a De Dion tube with half leaf springs in the back. The engine produces a claimed 30 PS (22 kW), enough to propel the Vamos to a top speed of 90 km/h (56 mph).

With new safety standards looming, which could hardly be met by the Vamos without a significant redesign, production was discontinued in March 1973. In spite of Honda's lofty original sales targets, only 2,500 examples were built in total.

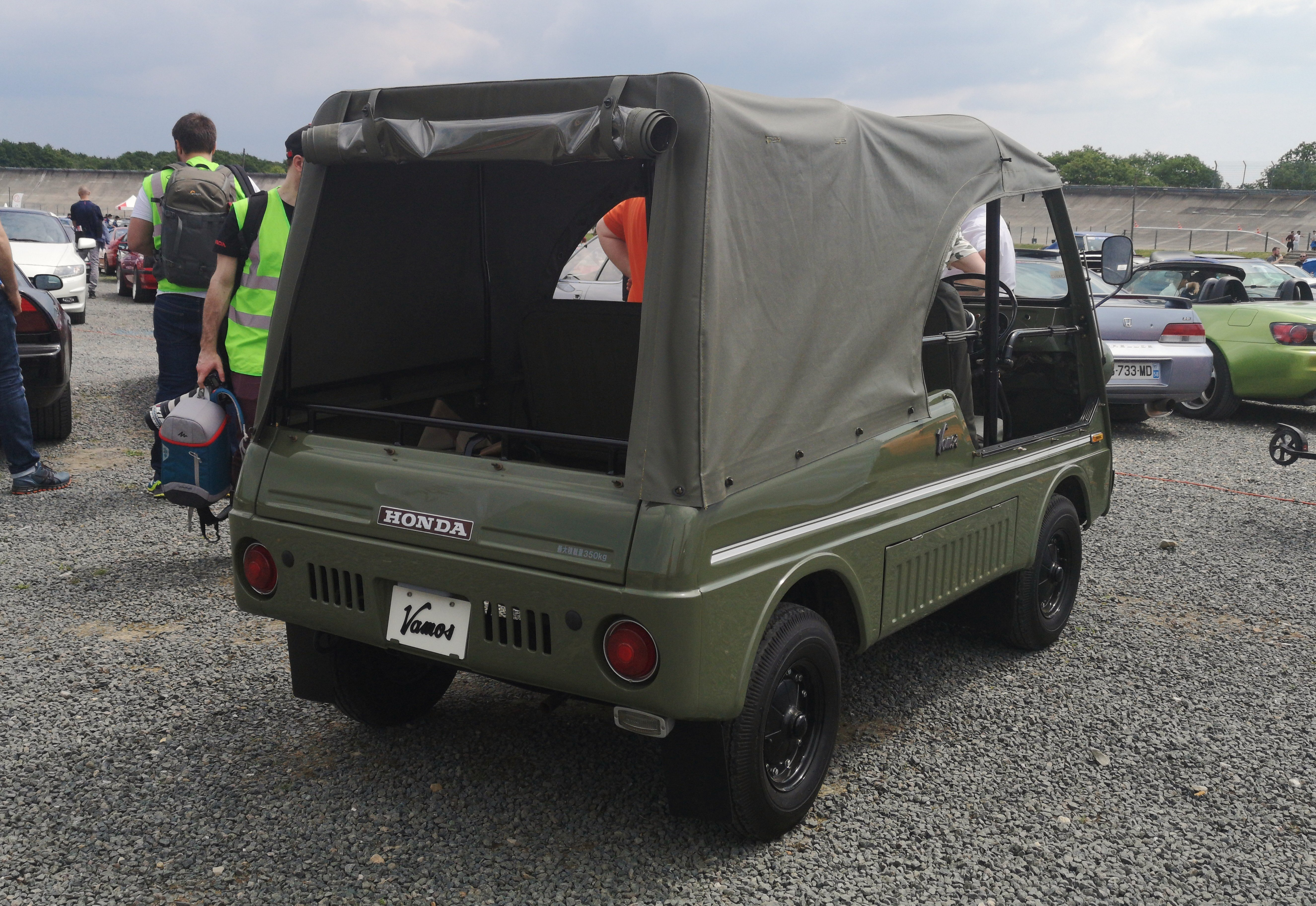
Rear view

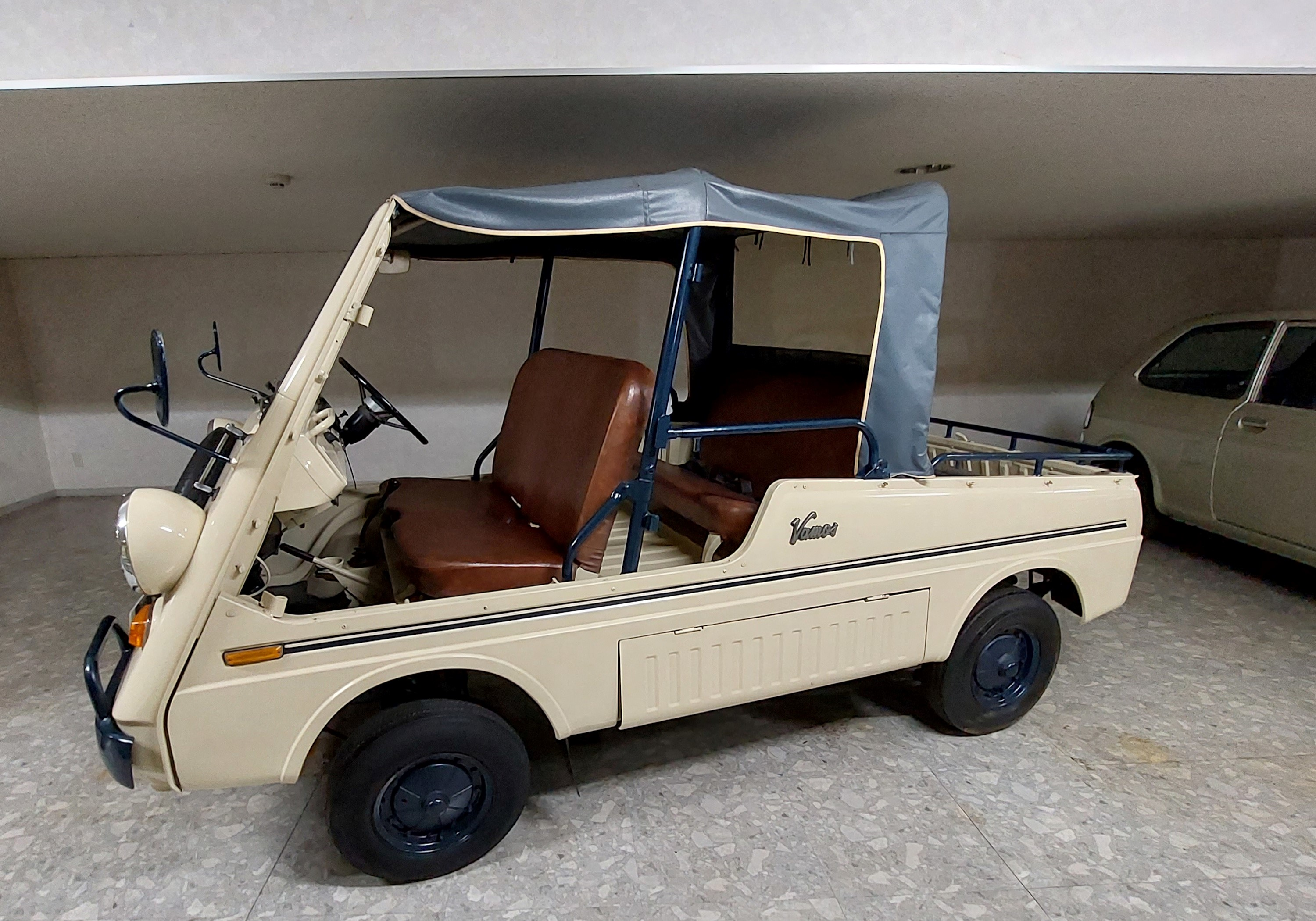
Side view of Vamos 4 with roof up

== Vamos & Vamos Hobio ==
Honda Vamos
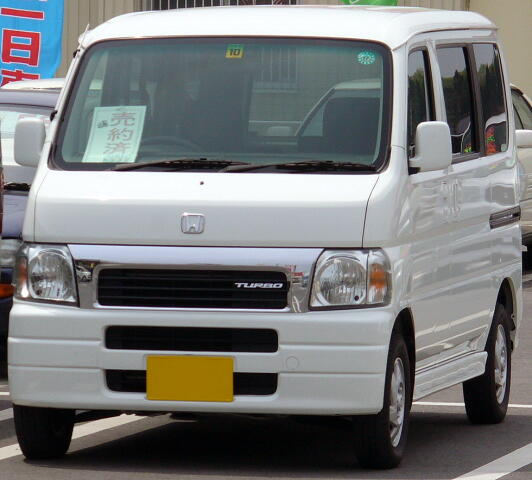
- Pre-facelift (turbo)

Overview
- Manufacturer: Honda
- Also called: Vamos Hobio
- Production: 1999–2018

Body and chassis
- Class: Microvan
- Body style: 5-door van
- Layout: Front-mid engine, rear-wheel-drive/four-wheel-drive
- Related: Honda Acty microvan (third generation); Mooku Reve

Powertrain
- Engine: 656 cc E07Z I3; 656 cc E07Z I3 turbo
- Transmission: 3-speed automatic; 4-speed automatic; 5-speed manual

Dimensions
- Wheelbase: 2,420 mm (95.3 in)
- Length: 3,395 mm (133.7 in)
- Width: 1,475 mm (58.1 in)
- Height: 1,775 mm (69.9 in)
- Curb weight: 1,070 kg (2,358.9 lb)

Chronology
- Predecessor: Honda Street trim level
- Successor: Honda N-Van; Honda N-Box

The Honda Vamos name was reintroduced in June 1999, and was joined by its twin, the Honda Vamos Hobio in April 2003. Both are microvans with 659 cc straight-3 SOHC E07Z gasoline engines and are upper trim level versions of the Honda Acty van. Four-wheel drive is optional, using Honda's Full Time 4WD system that utilizes a viscous coupling. It features independent suspension with front coil springs and rear leaf springs. The engine is also available with a turbocharger with the maximum horsepower being limited to 64 PS (47 kW).

The Vamos is marketed more for personal use whereas the Acty van and truck are geared more towards commercial and industrial uses, and as delivery vehicles. The Vamos has a redesigned rear end, with vertical rather than horizontal taillights and a smaller rear gate. Most of the luxury equipment offered on the Vamos is not available on the Acty. The Vamos competes with the Suzuki Every van, the Subaru Sambar van and the Daihatsu Atrai van in Japan. The 2003 Vamos Hobio is a "recreational" vehicle, meant to be used as part of an active lifestyle. It has a roof which is 105 mm (4.1 in) taller and has the Acty Van's bigger tailgate and low-mounted taillights. The interior features numerous hooks and mounting points on the floor and walls and has water proof trim. The Vamos Hobio also has a different front design with a more prominent, trapezoidal grille.

Various trim packages and unique options have been offered on the Vamos and Vamos Hobio, with almost yearly cosmetic changes to items like grille, tail lights and color combinations. The interior seats are configurable into multiple positions to maximize its load-carrying and passenger accommodation. From May until October 2003 Honda also accepted orders for the Vamos Hobio "Travel Dog Package," especially designed to accommodate dogs. This offered water-repellant and deodorant upholstery, pet mats, and other special equipment. In May 2007 a Travel Dog Package was again offered, this time on the regular Vamos. This package remained available to order until the end of January 2008.

Aftermarket appearance kits are available in Japan.

Production of the Vamos and Vamos Hobio was discontinued on May 21, 2018 as the car could not meet new crash safety standards without extensive reengineering. The Vamos was replaced by the N-Van, although scattered examples of existing stock continued to be sold until the final Vamos Hobio Pro was sold in October 2019.

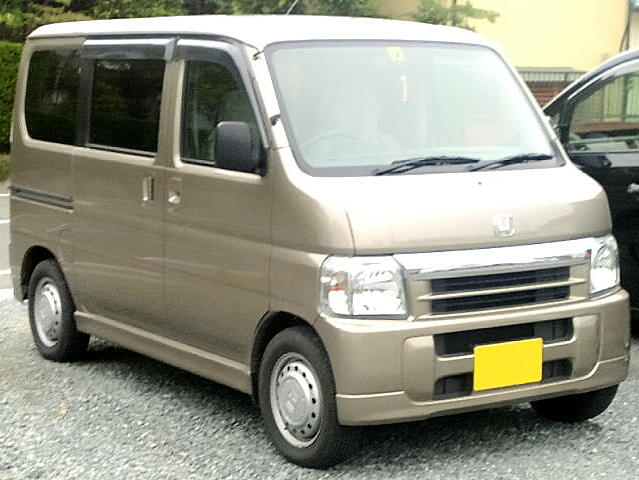
Vamos front view (2001 facelift model)

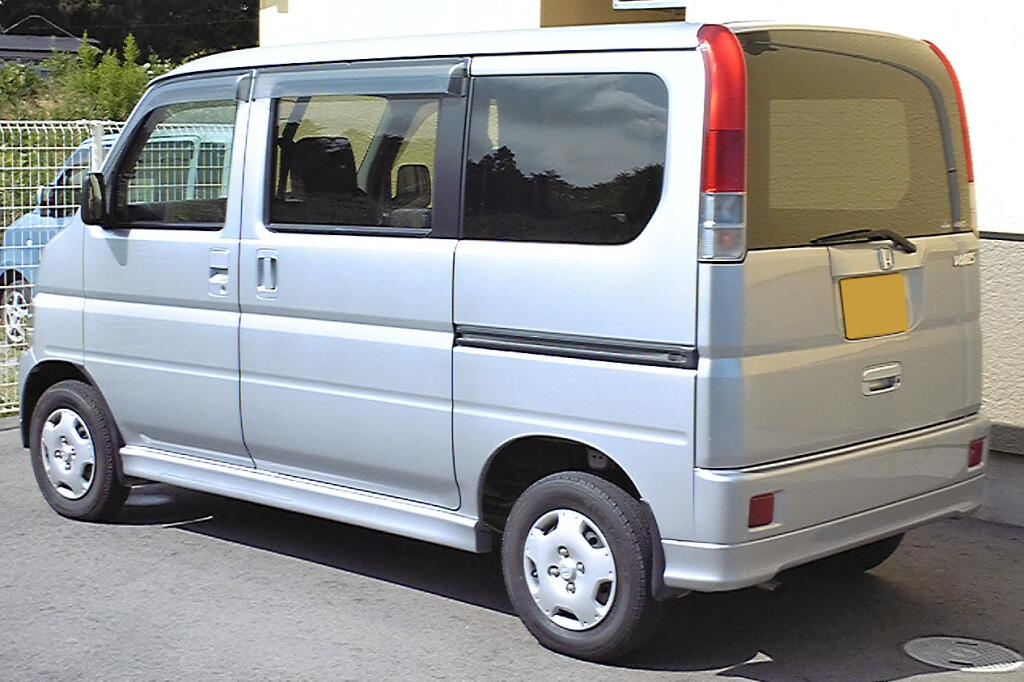
Vamos rear view (2001 facelift model)

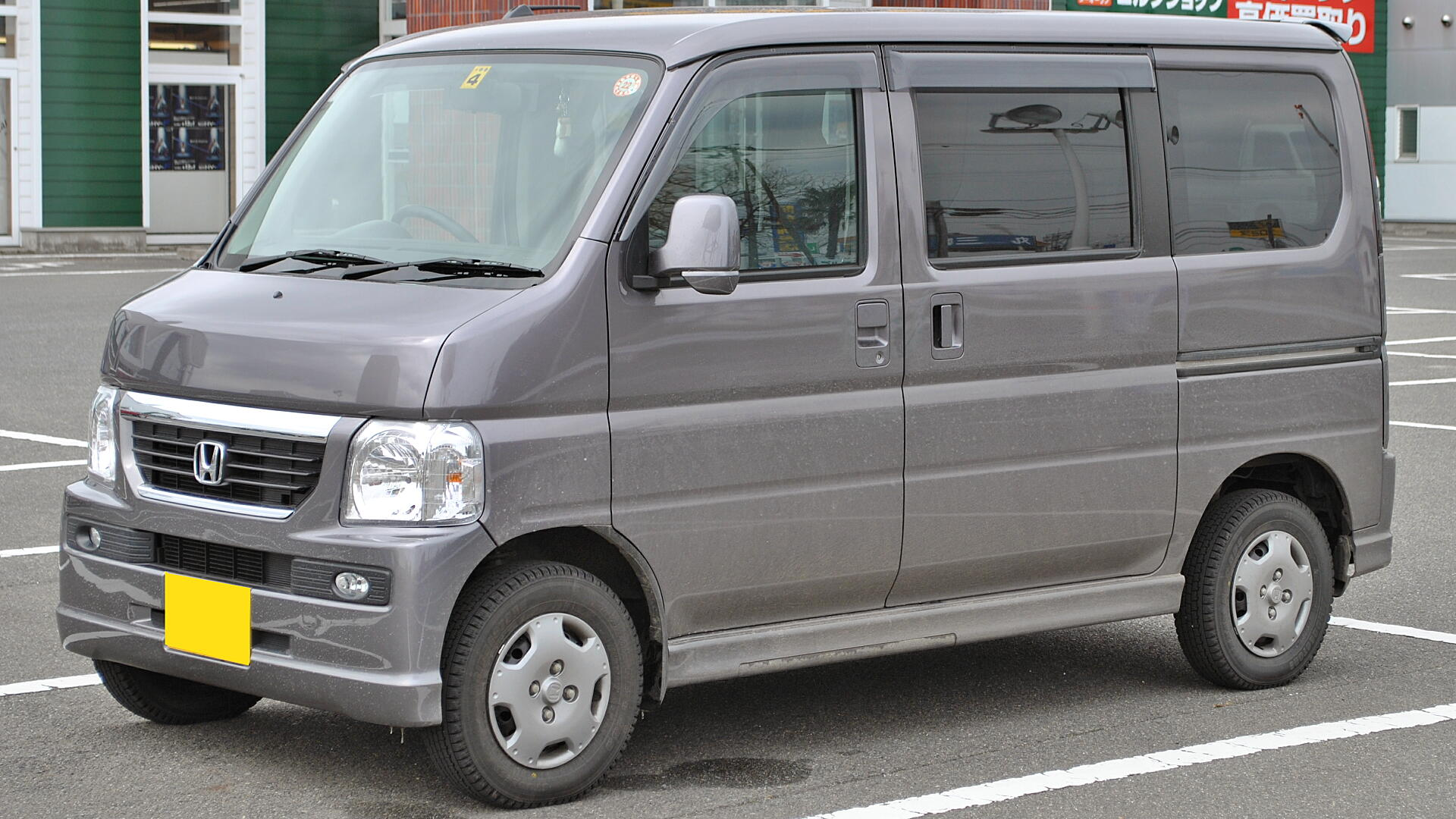
2007-2010 version

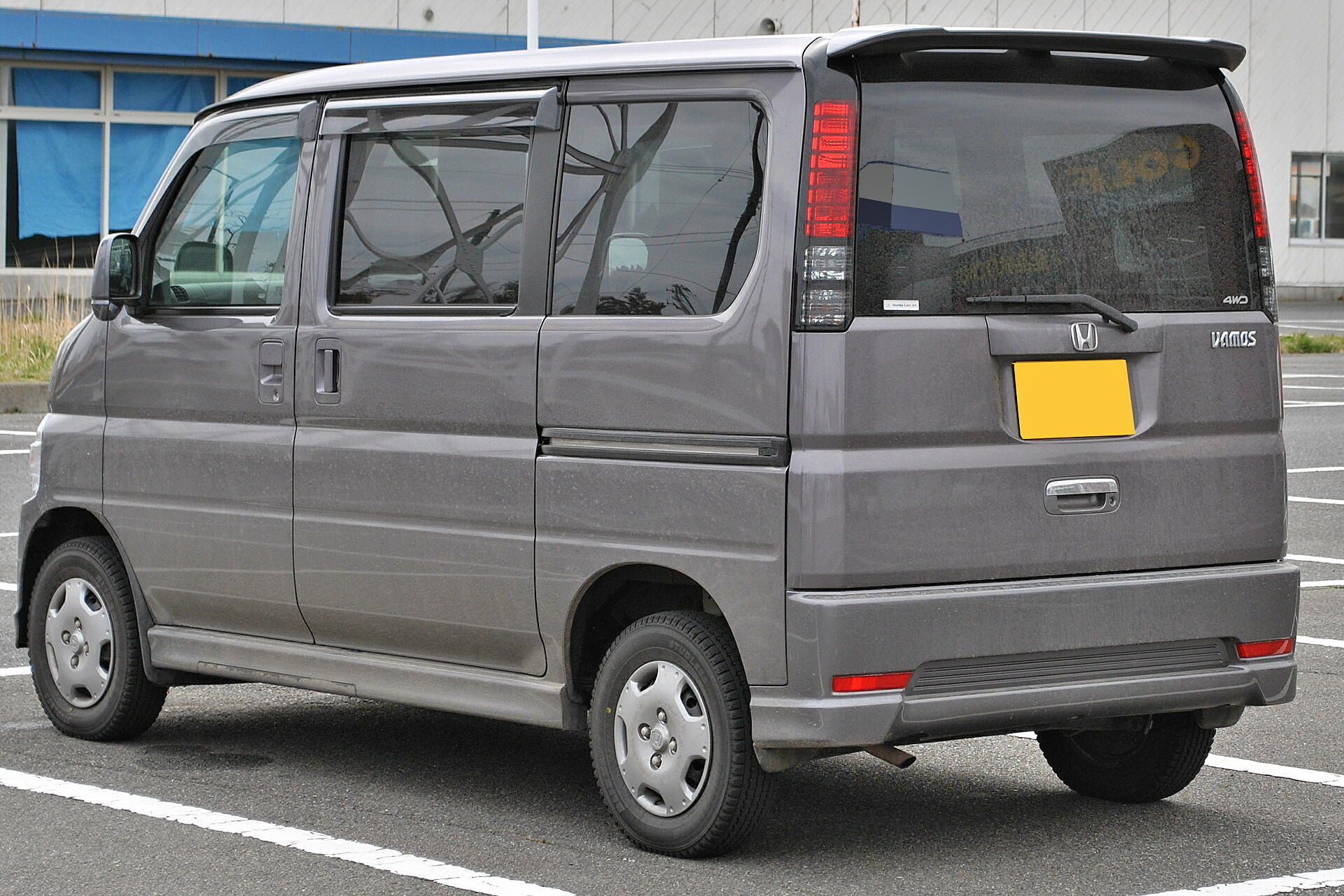
2007-2010 version

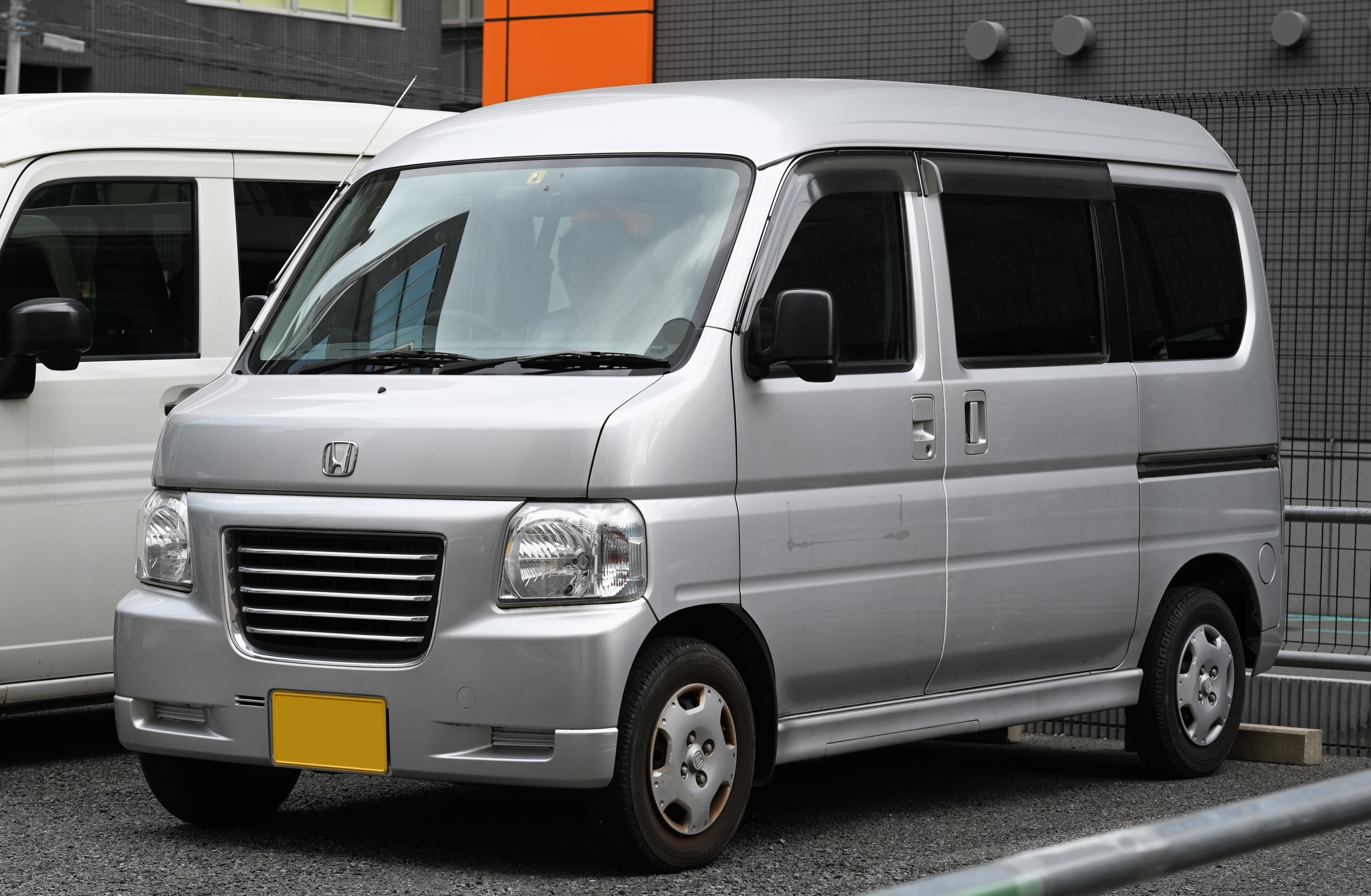
Vamos Hobio front, showing different grille

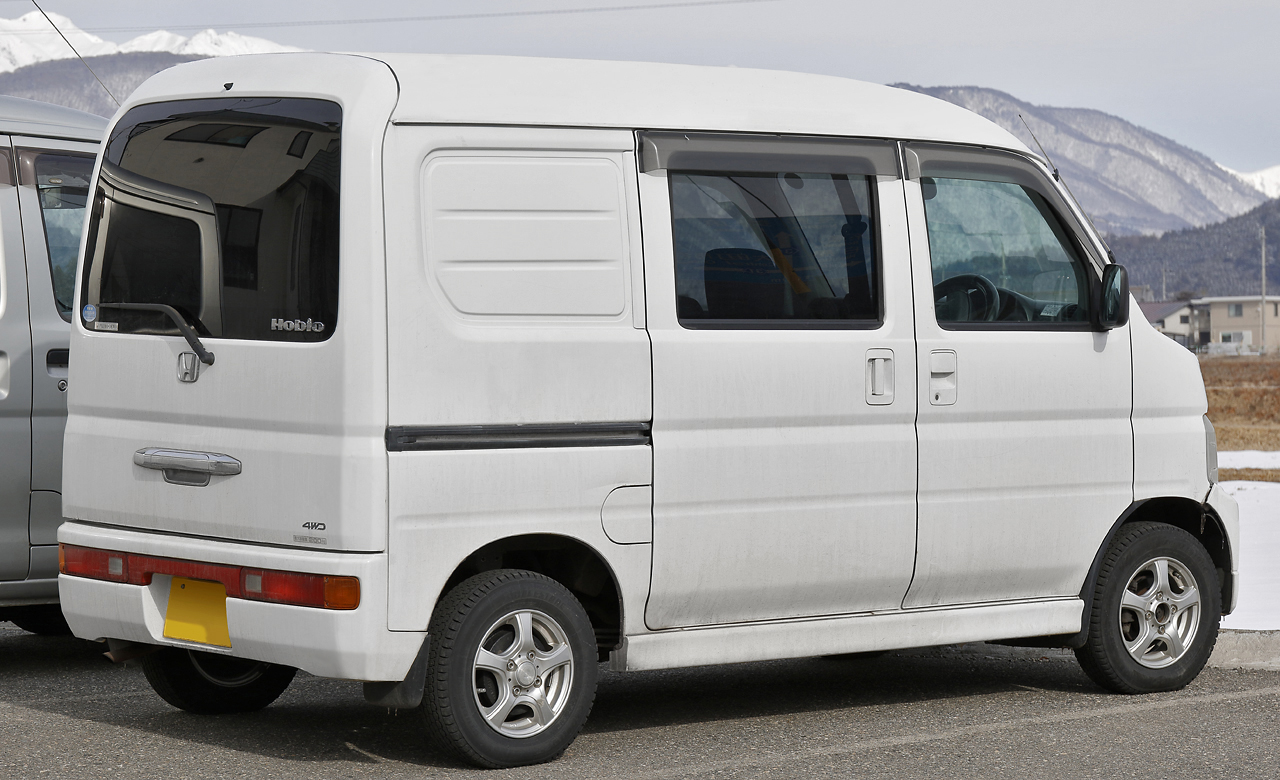
Vamos Hobio rear view, showing the different tail light design as also used on the Acty
