= Honda Life =

Automobile nameplate used on a Honda kei car series (1971-2014)

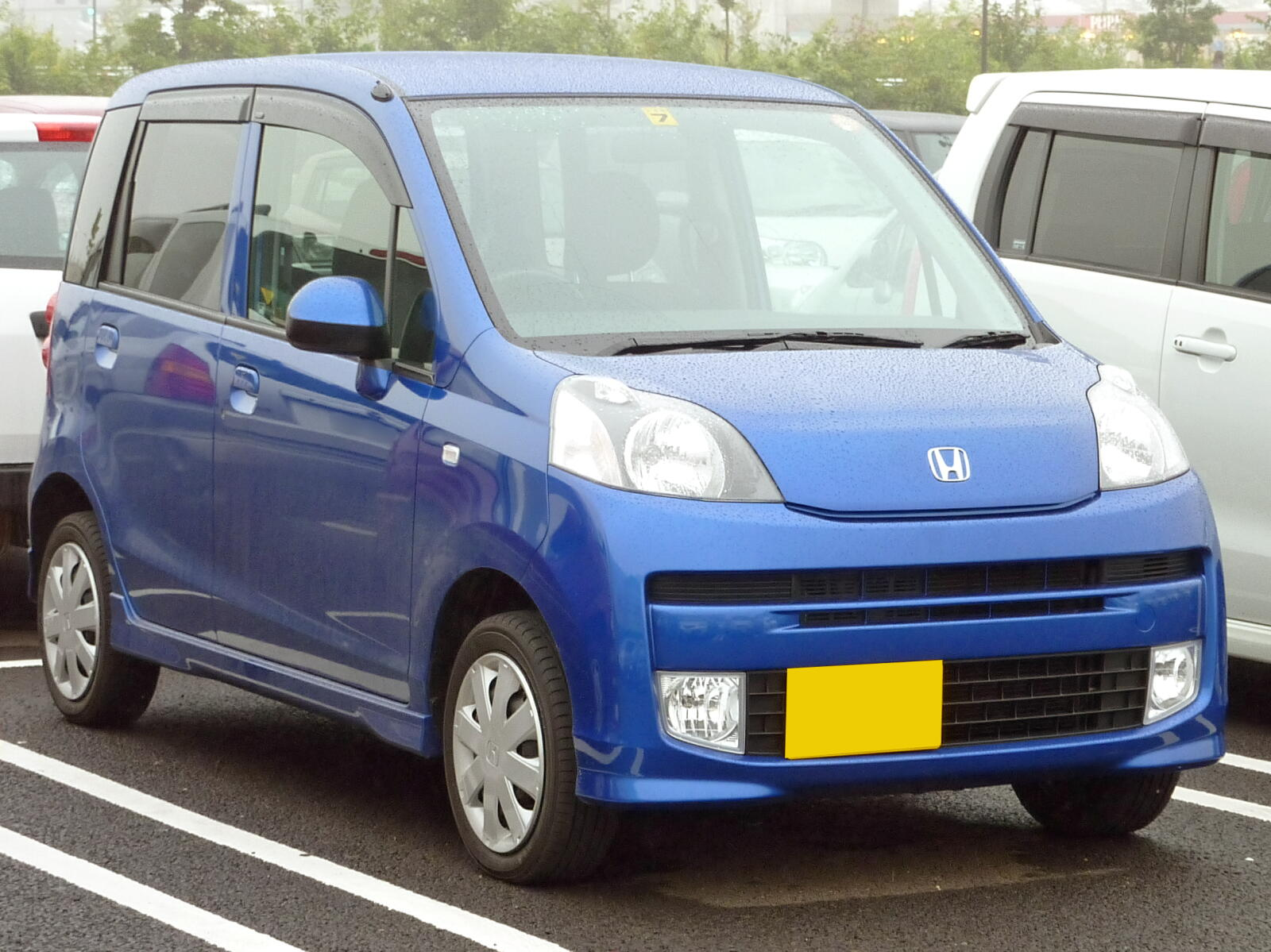
- Honda Life Diva (fifth generation)

Overview
- Manufacturer: Honda
- Production: 1971–1974; 1997–2014; 2020–2025 (China)

Body and chassis
- Class: Kei car

Chronology
- Predecessor: Honda Today (1997)
- Successor: Honda N-One; Honda N-Box; Honda N-WGN

The Honda Life is an automobile nameplate that was used on various kei car/city cars produced by Honda: passenger cars, microvans, and kei trucks. The first series of the nameplate was built between 1971 and 1974, with the nameplate revived in 1997 and used until 2014. The Japanese-market Life has rarely been marketed outside Japan.

In 2020, Dongfeng Honda revived the "Life" nameplate in China as a rebadged variant of the Fit produced by Guangqi Honda until 2025.

== First generation (1971) ==
First generation
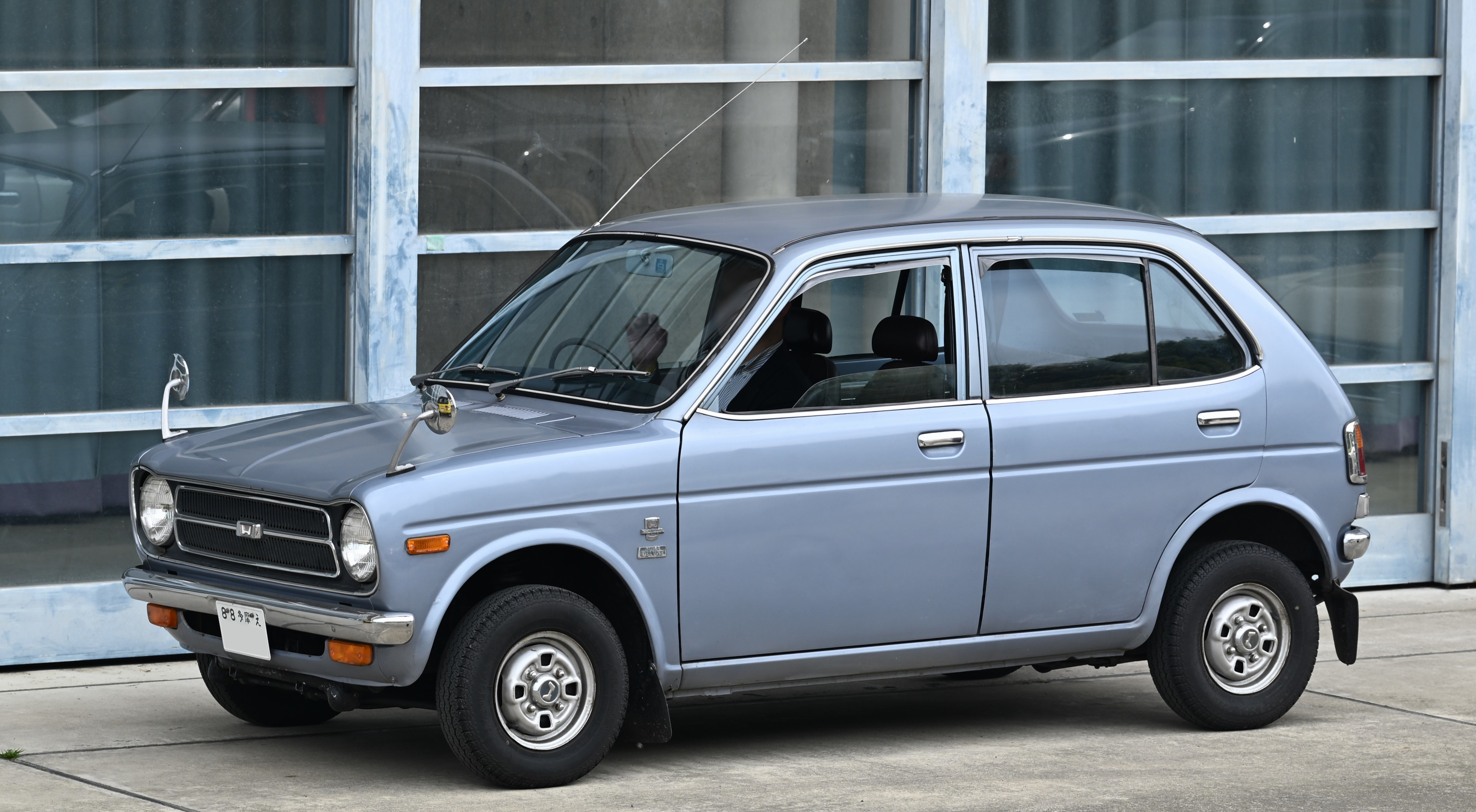
- Life Super Deluxe 4-door sedan

Overview
- Manufacturer: Honda
- Model code: SA/VA/WA
- Production: 1971–1974
- Assembly: Suzuka Plant, Suzuka, Mie, Japan

Body and chassis
- Class: City car
- Body style: 2/4-door sedan (SA); 3-door hatchback (Van/Wagon, VA/WA)
- Layout: Front-engine, front-wheel-drive

Powertrain
- Engine: 356 cc EA I2
- Transmission: 3/4/5-speed manual 3-speed Hondamatic automatic

Dimensions
- Wheelbase: 2,080 mm (81.9 in)
- Length: 2,995 mm (117.9 in)
- Width: 1,295 mm (51.0 in)
- Height: 1,340–1,370 mm (52.8–53.9 in)
- Curb weight: 480–540 kg (1,058–1,190 lb)

Chronology
- Predecessor: Honda NIII360
- Successor: Honda Today

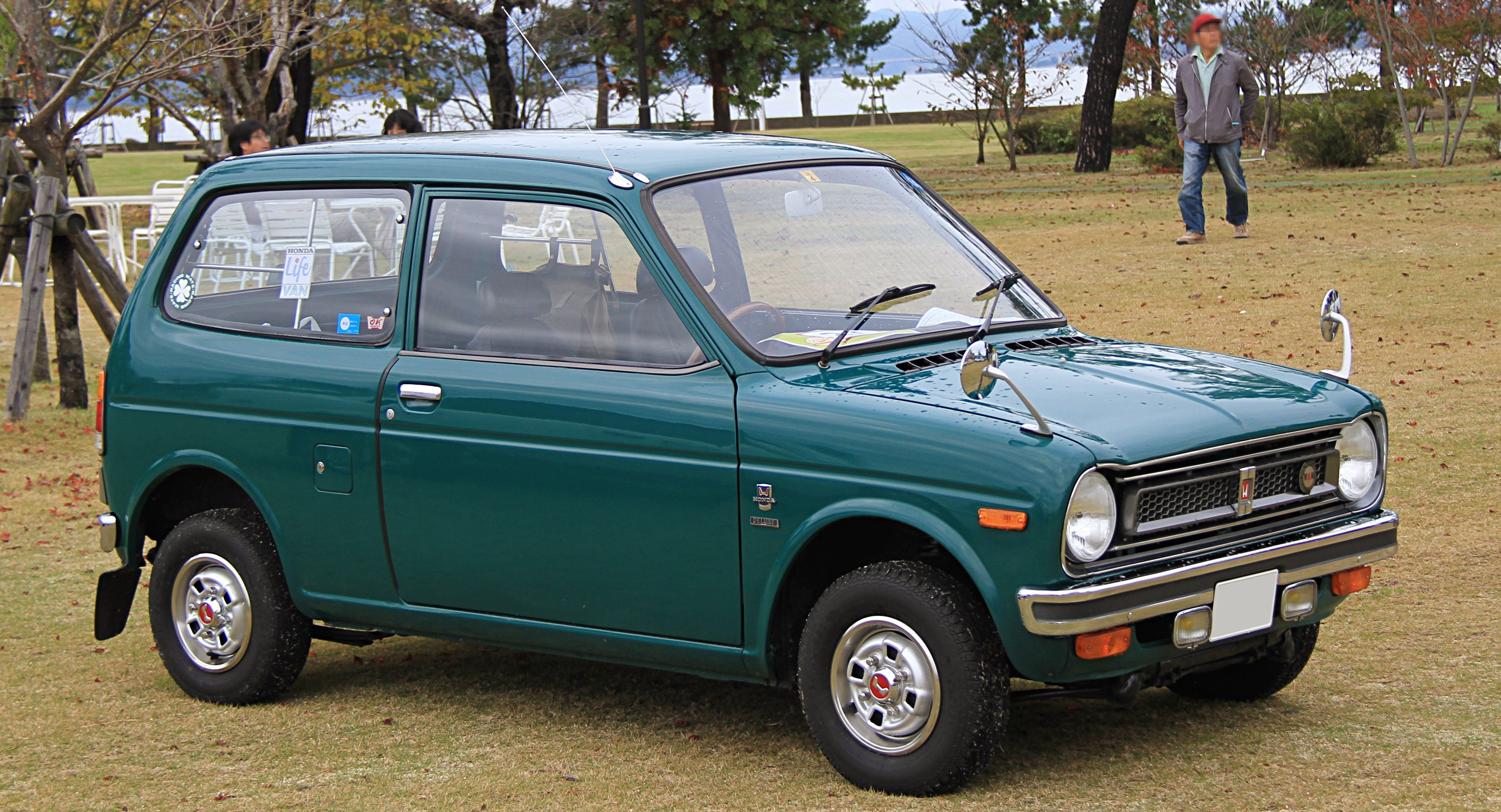

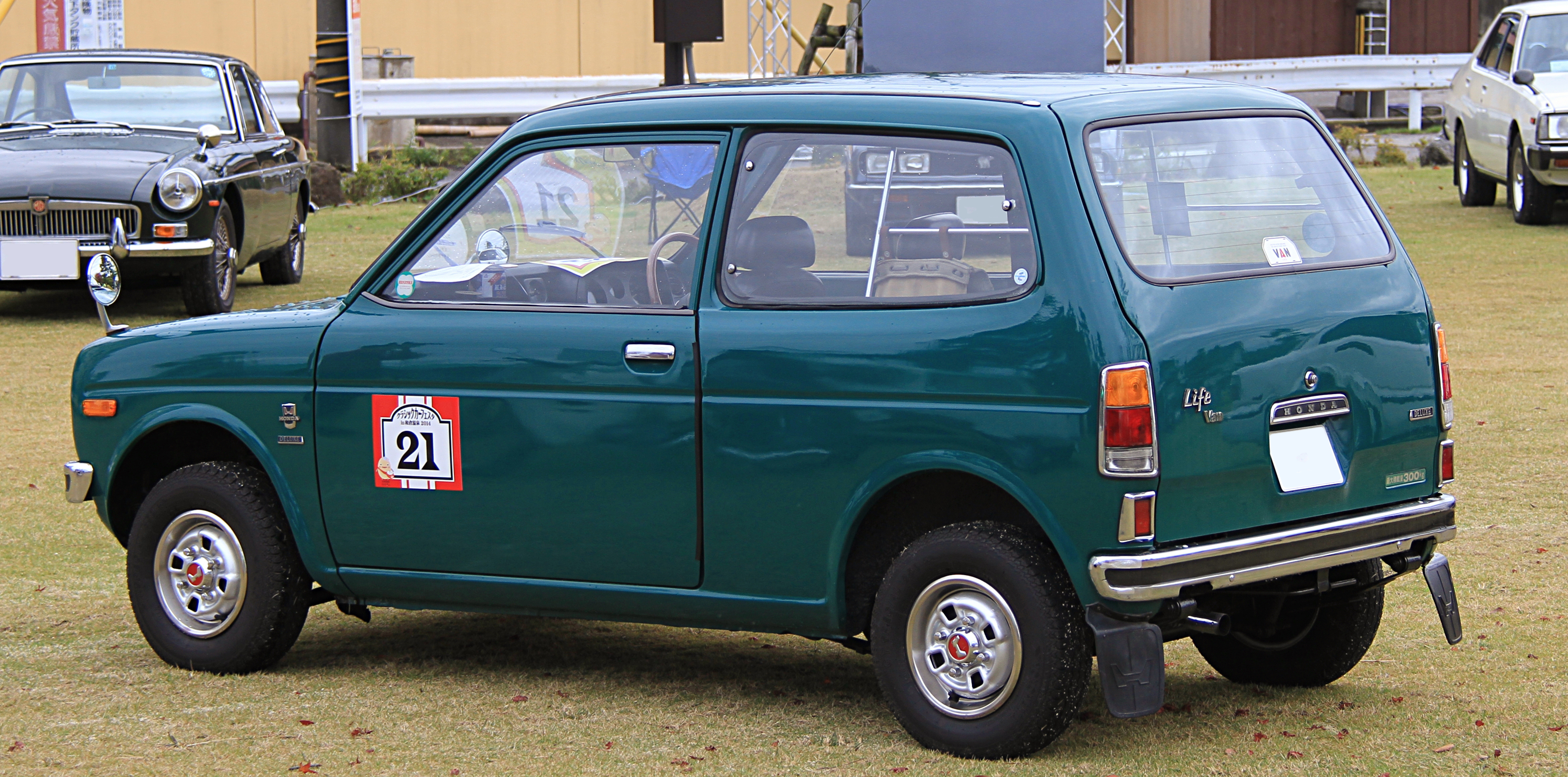
1974 Honda Life 3-door Van Deluxe

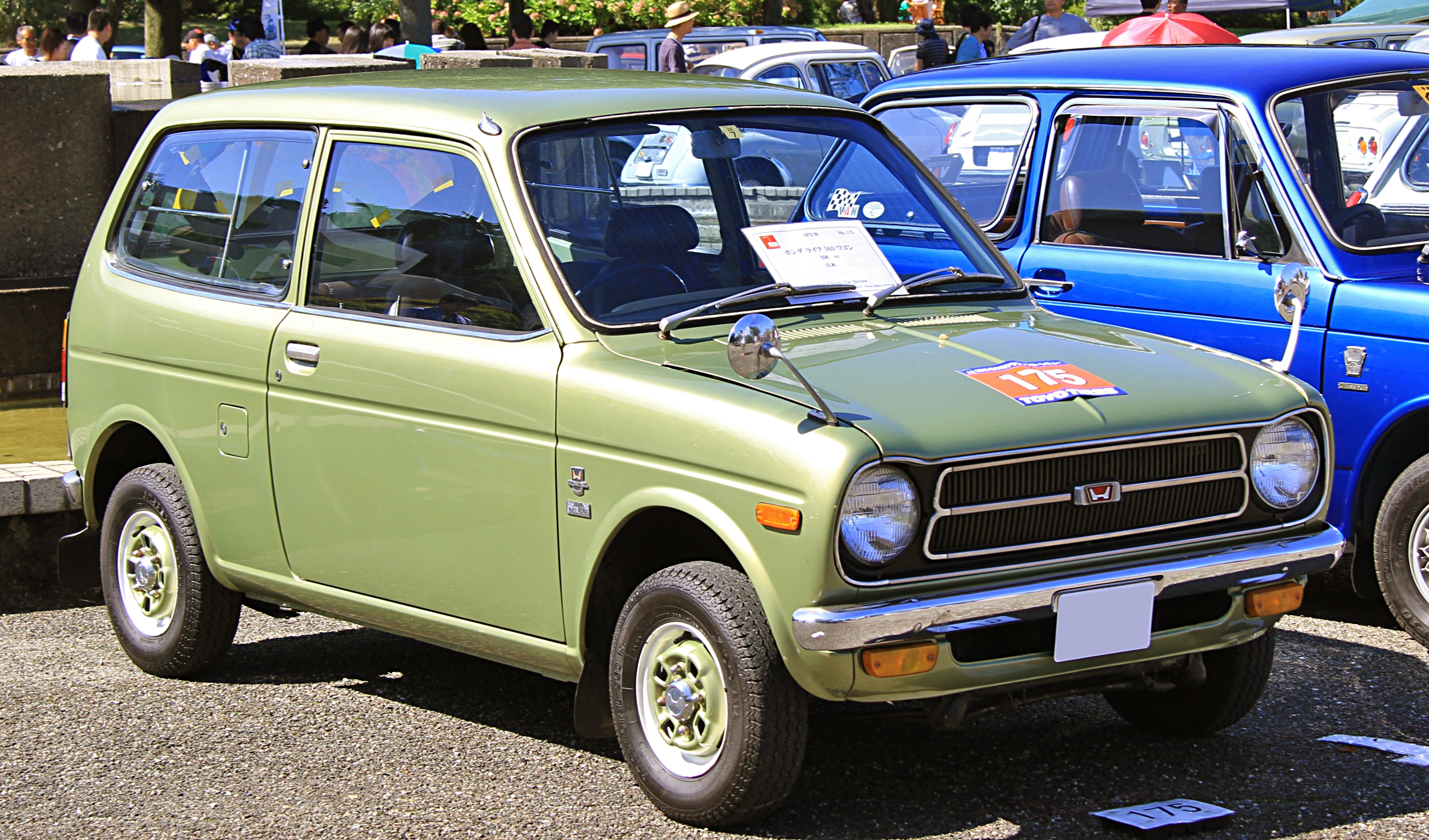
Honda Life 3-door Wagon Super Deluxe

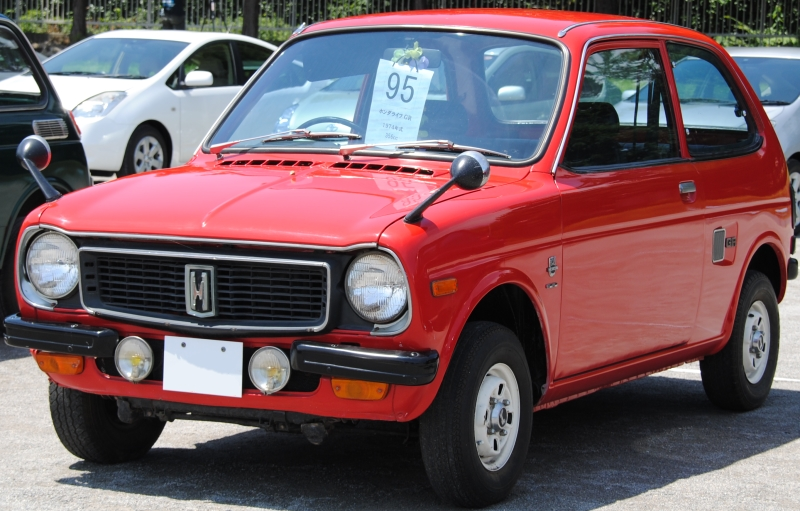
Honda Life 2-door sedan

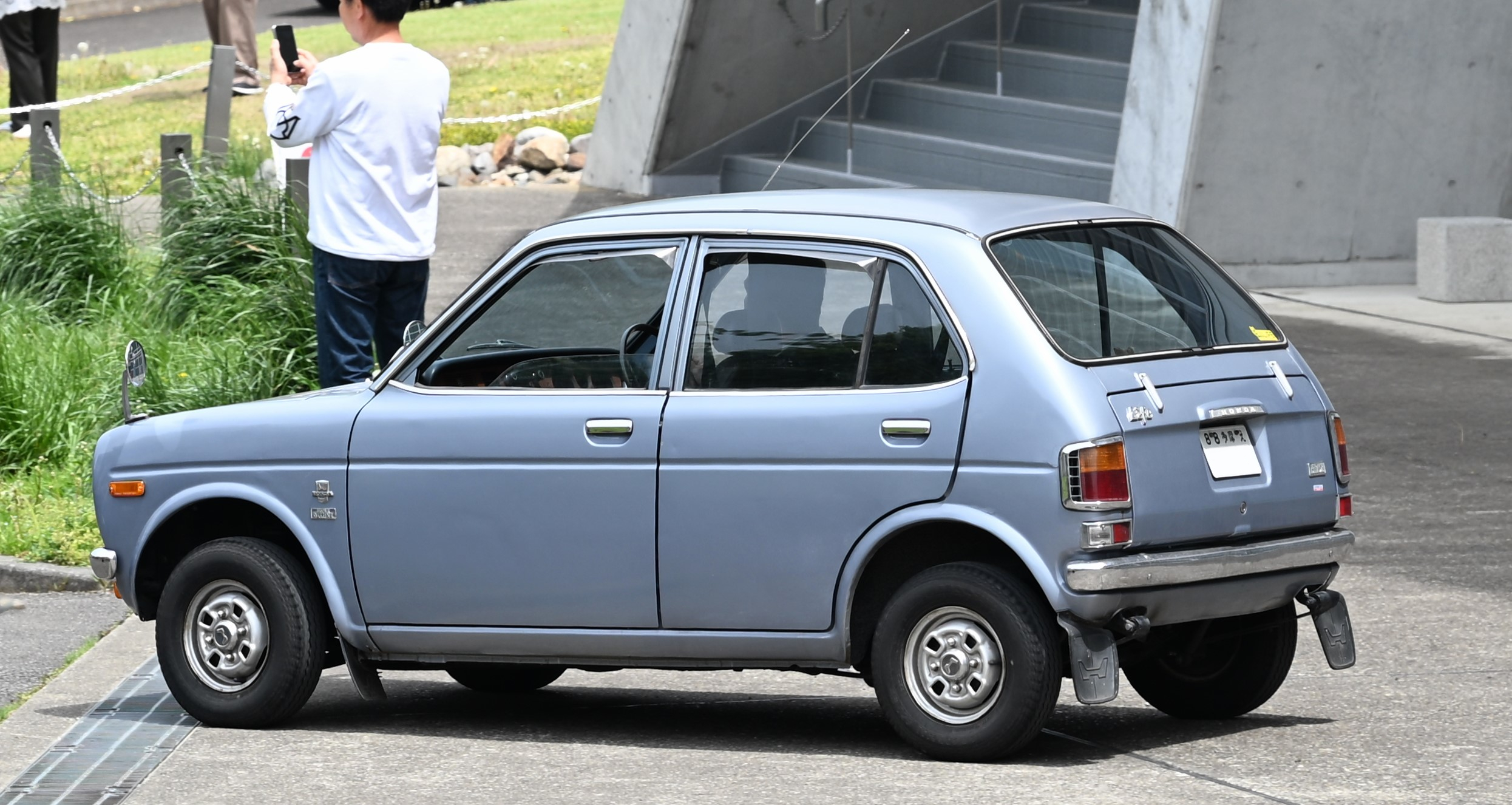
Sedan rear view

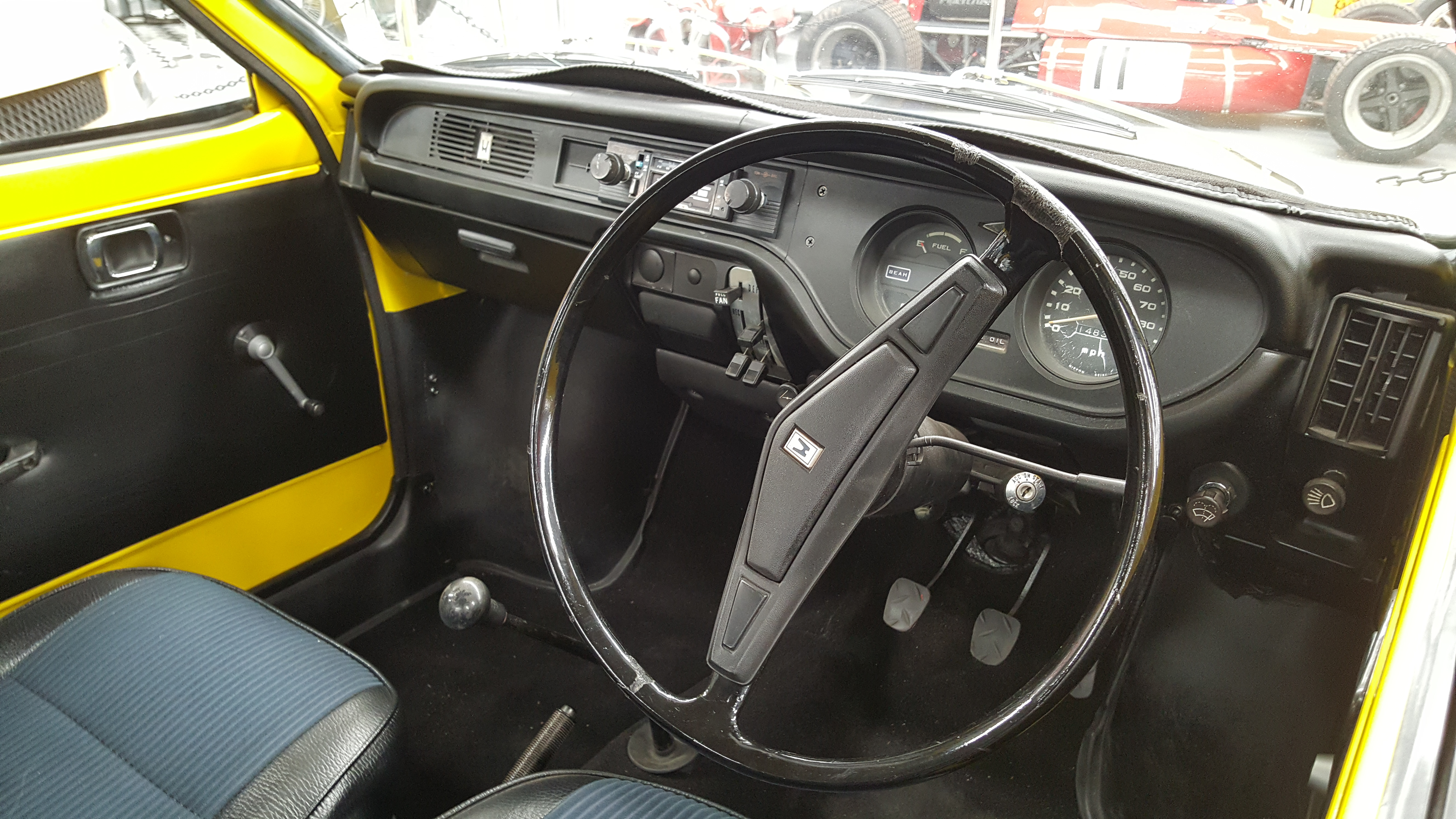
Interior

The original Life range was offered as a two-door or four-door sedan and in a three-door wagon model (also sold as a commercial van), replacing the Honda NIII360. Compared with the previous Honda minicar series, passenger comfort was improved to make this a better family car - indeed, Honda's target was to make a kei which was as habitable as a period 1-litre car. To that end, the wheelbase, at 2,080 mm (82 in), was eight cm longer than that of the predecessor. The entire Life range had a water-cooled Honda EA 356 cc engine, usually producing 30 PS (30 hp; 22 kW) at 8,000 rpm. which began as the air-cooled engine borrowed from the Honda CB450 motorcycle. The top speed of the sedan is 105 km/h (65 mph). The sprint to 100 km/h (62 mph) came up in 34.9 seconds in a period test. In September 1972, the tall and curiously shaped "Life Step Van" was introduced, with either three or five doors. A pickup version of this was later added to the lineup, but had minimal impact on the market.

The engine was also installed with a balance shaft to reduce vibration. The engine was called "refined" in period tests, and was considered to be as quiet and smooth as some four-cylinder engines. The change to a water-cooled engine also eliminated the smell in the heating system commonly associated with air-cooled engines that drew the heated air into the passenger compartment. Another improvement was that the gearbox was separate from the engine, unlike in the N-series where the gearbox was in the sump (as for the original Mini). Production of the Life coincided with the larger Honda Civic with both vehicles having introduced a timing belt (rather than chain) for the operation of the overhead cam.

This version of the Life was exported to a few markets, such as Australia, where the four-door version (same specs as in the Japanese version) entered the market in the middle of 1972. The two-door N360/600 continued on sale alongside. The Life was only produced for four years, as the Civic proved to be much more popular both in Japan and internationally. When the decision was made to cancel the Life, it ended Honda's production of a passenger kei car until 1985, with the introduction of the Honda Today. At the time, the Life was ¥350,000, and the Civic was ¥400,000. The Civic also had an advantage of size, making the car safer in a collision.

Development

- 1 June 1971

The Life emerged as the successor to the Honda NIII360. It was fitted with a series of newly designed two-cylinder 356 cc SOHC, liquid-cooled four-stroke engines equipped with a balancer shaft. For strictly urban use, a lower-revving engine with a lower compression (8.0:1, as opposed to 8.8:1 for the higher powered version) was installed in the "Life Town". For this version, which was a no-cost option across the range, the engine output was dropped to 21 PS (15 kW; 21 hp) at 6,500 rpm - as opposed to 8,000 rpm for the high-compression unit. It also received a three-speed transmission, meaning that top speed was limited to 90 km/h.

- 20 July 1971

An all-new, three-speed, fully automatic transmission was made available. Unlike the manual, the automatic's shifter was column-mounted.

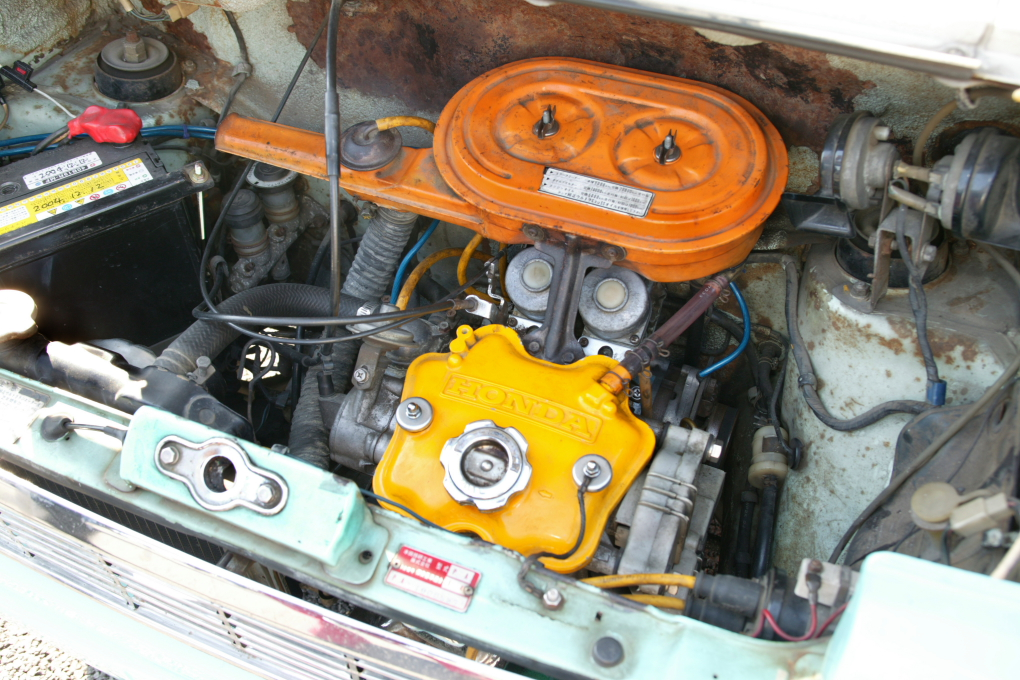
Honda Life two-cylinder EA engine with twin Keihin carburetors

- 6 September 1971

A three-door commercial-use "Van" was added, with unique bodywork from the B-pillars back. Slightly taller than its sedan counterparts, like them the Life Van was also available with the full automatic transmission.

- 25 October 1971

A private-use version of the Life Van (called "Wagon", chassis code WA) was added, priced midway between the two- and four-door sedans. This could also be equipped with the three-speed automatic. The Van can be told from a wagon by its tattletale luggage rails visible through the rear windows.

- 1 May 1972

A sporty engine with twin constant velocity carburettors was added, for the new "Touring" range. The all two-door lineup consisted of the SS, SL, and the GS on top. Power was up to 36 PS (26 kW; 36 hp) at 9,000 rpm, and the top-of-the-line GS received a dogleg five-speed gearbox to take full advantage of the peakier engine. The Touring GS could reach a top speed of 120 km/h (75 mph). On June 15 of the same year, the Life received a minor facelift with redesigned grilles, and in September four-door versions of the Touring range appeared. Production of the lower-powered "Town" engine also came to an end during 1972.

- 20 September 1972

The Life Step Van was launched, the packaging of which embodies the tall wagon style so popular for current keis.

- 21 August 1973

The Life Pickup was released. At the same time, the sedan lineup underwent a minor facelift (another new grille) and the lineup was reshuffled. The automatic option was now only available on one two-door and one four-door model.

- October 1974

In the face of an ever-contracting Kei class combined with ever more stringent emissions standards, manufacture of the Life series, along with the Z360/600, came to an end. This ended Honda kei passenger car participation, until the 1985 arrival of the Today.

=== Life Step Van ===
Step Van/Pickup (VA/PA)
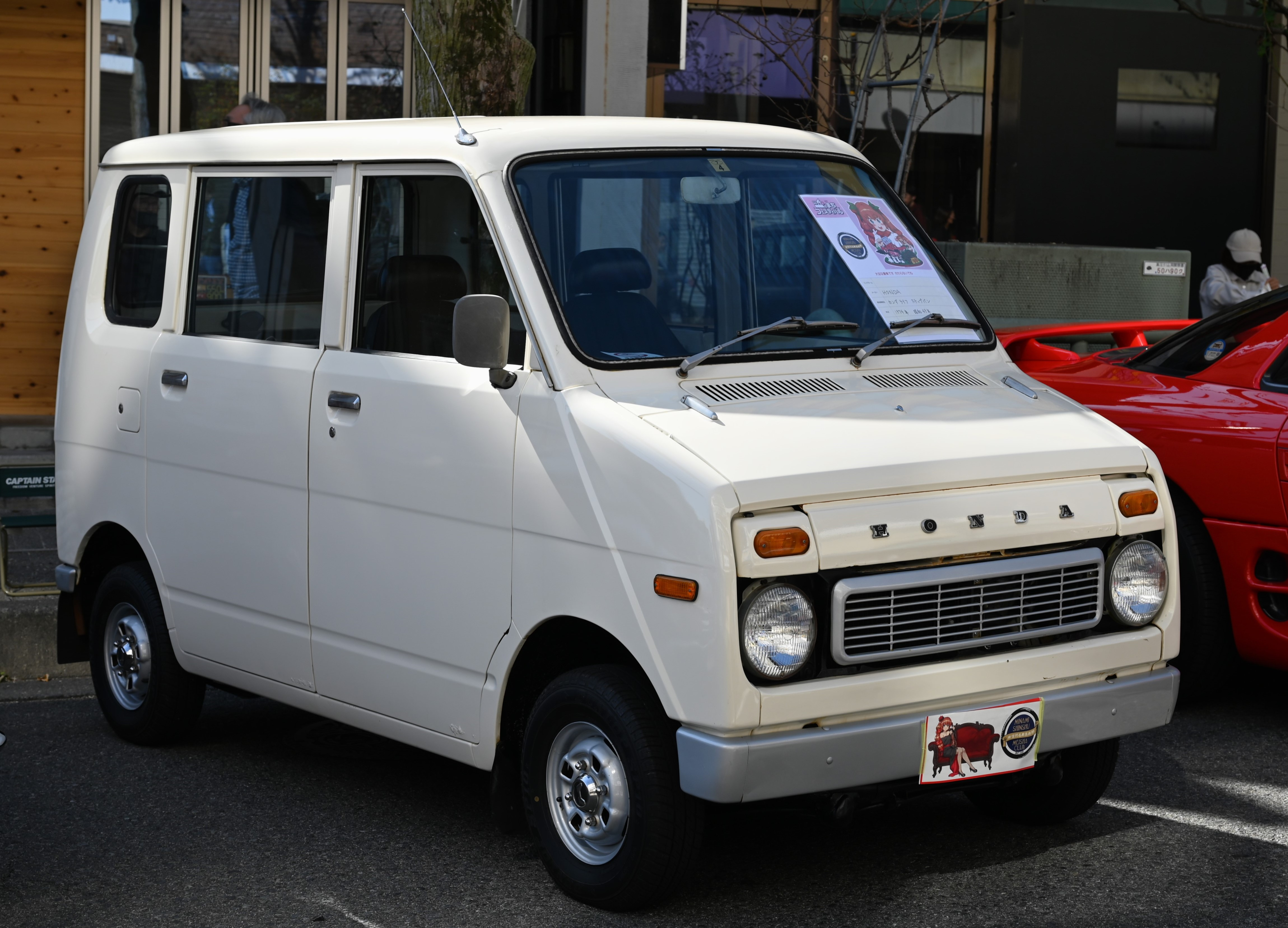

Overview
- Production: 1972–1974; Pick-up: 1973–1974
- Assembly: Suzuka Plant, Suzuka, Mie, Japan

Body and chassis
- Body style: 2-door kei truck 5-door microvan
- Layout: Front-engine, front-wheel-drive

Powertrain
- Engine: 356 cc EA Straight-twin engine
- Transmission: 4-speed manual

Dimensions
- Wheelbase: 2,080 mm (81.9 in)
- Length: 2,995 mm (117.9 in)
- Width: 1,295 mm (51.0 in)
- Height: 1,620 mm (63.8 in)
- Curb weight: 550–605 kg (1,213–1,334 lb)

Chronology
- Successor: Honda TN-V (Pickup)

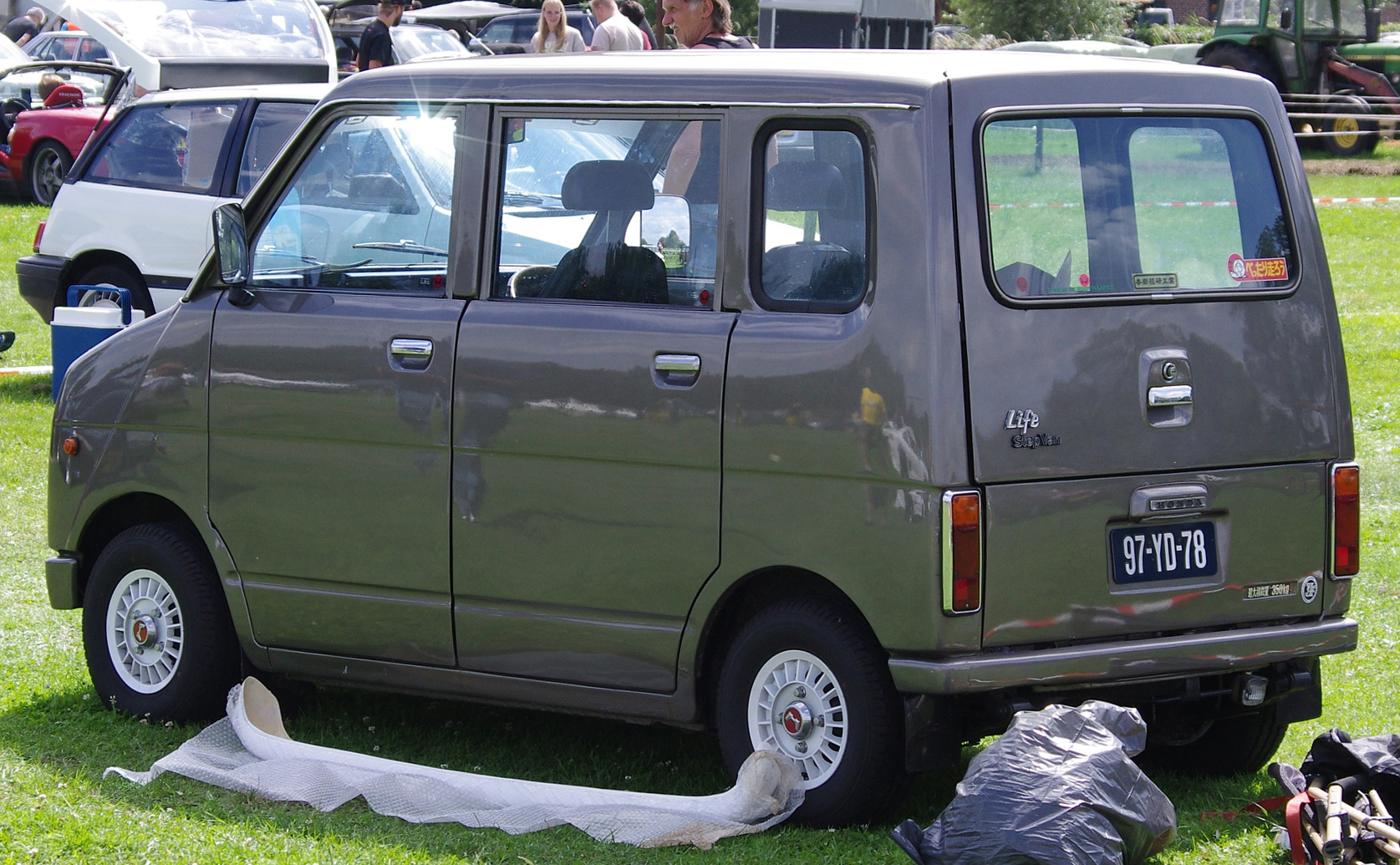
Rear view

This Step Van type variant, which shares the VA chassis code with the low-bodied Life Van, also uses the same 30 PS (22 kW; 30 hp) 356 cc, two-cylinder water-cooled engine as does the rest of the range. At the time of introduction, its front-wheel drive layout and bonneted design was considered a novel approach, but it had some benefits in that the entire drivetrain was installed up front: The Step Van, while its loading space was shorter, could offer certain interior space advantages such as a very low and flat floor that competing, rear-wheel drive vehicles couldn't provide at the time. It drew many influences from the DKW Schnellaster produced in Europe. Its appearance, while unique and not appreciated when new, is now the standard approach for current kei products from Japanese manufacturers. The rear gate was of a clamshell style, divided horizontally. The 605 kg (1,334 lb) Step Van, like the regular Life Van, could carry 300 kg (661 lb) with two occupants, down to 200 kg (441 lb) with the full complement of two more passengers.

The van was first sold on 20 September 1972 with production ending in 1974, at an introductory price of ¥376,000 for the standard Step Van and ¥403,000 for the Super DX version. The Step Van series was only ever available with a four-speed manual transmission. The price of the Standard model had crept up to ¥388,000 by the time of the introduction of the pickup version. A total of 17,165 vehicles were produced, for a total of less than half the projected 2,000 units per month. It also can be found in the Gran Turismo 4, Gran Turismo (PSP), Gran Turismo 5 and Gran Turismo 6 videogames, as the Honda Life StepVan.

=== Life pick-up ===
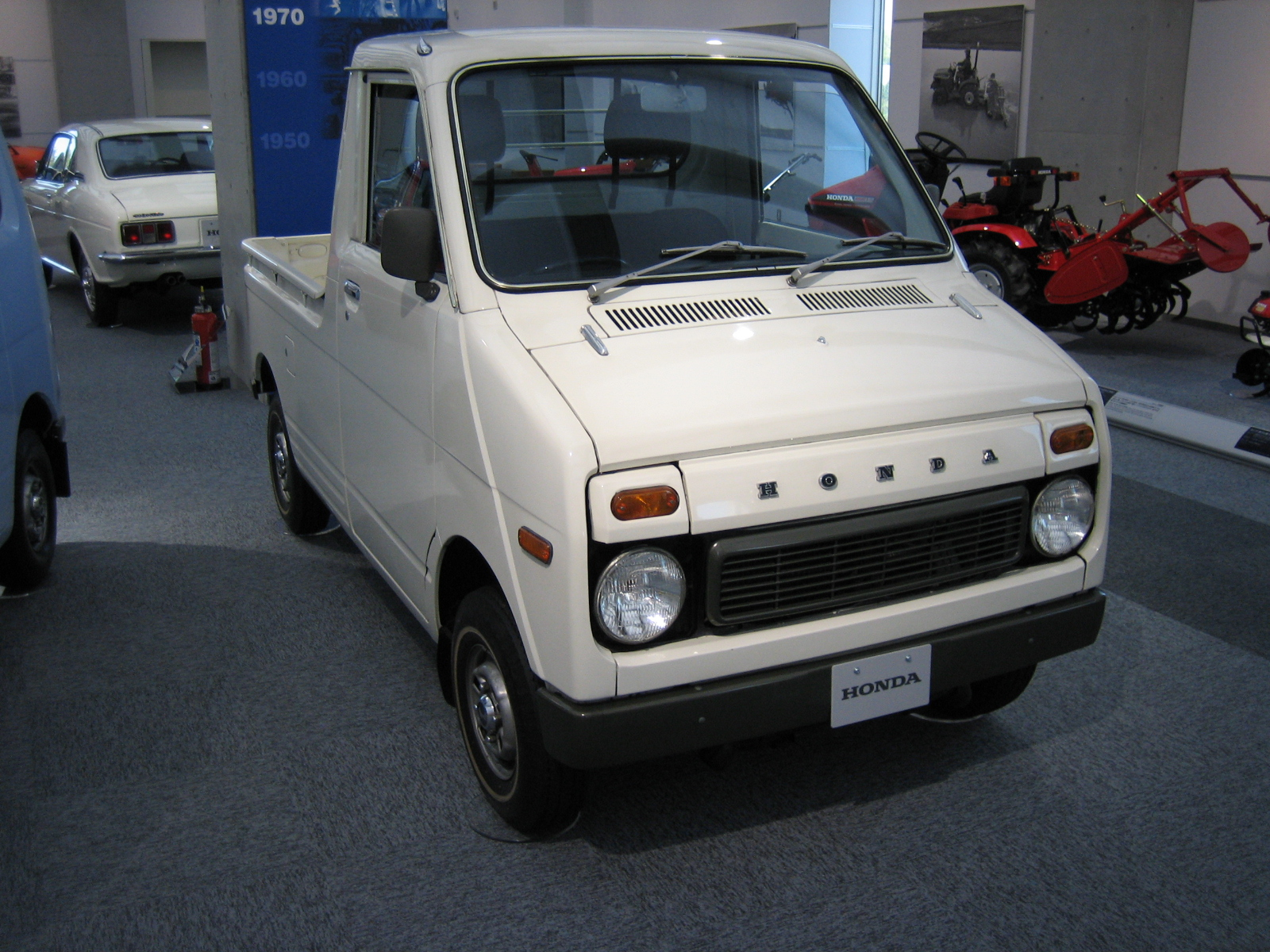
Life Pickup

Introduced on 21 August 1973, this version of the Life was designed as a pickup truck. The pick-up received the PA chassis code. In spite of weighing only 550 kg (1,213 lb), the Life Pickup could carry a 350 kg (772 lb) payload. Production ended in 1974, with no more than 1,132 vehicles produced, as the Honda TN7 cab over truck with its considerably longer bed proved to be more popular.

== Second generation (1997) ==
Second generation
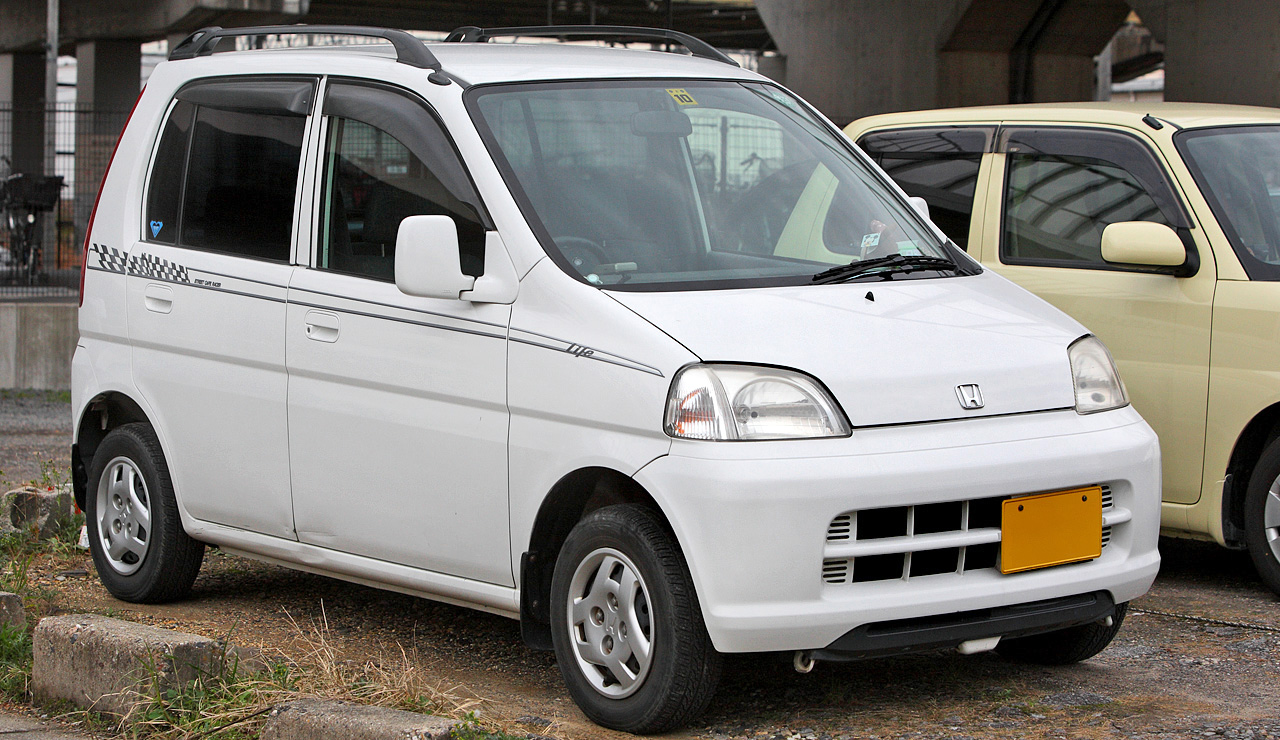

Overview
- Model code: JA4
- Production: 1997–1998
- Assembly: Yachiyo Plant, Yokkaichi, Mie, Japan

Body and chassis
- Body style: 5-door hatchback
- Layout: Front-engine, front-wheel-drive
- Related: Honda Today (JA4/5)

Powertrain
- Engine: 656 cc E07A SOHC 12V I3
- Transmission: 3-speed automatic 5-speed manual

Dimensions
- Wheelbase: 2,330 mm (91.7 in)
- Length: 3,295 mm (129.7 in)
- Width: 1,395 mm (54.9 in)
- Height: 1,635 mm (64.4 in)
- Curb weight: 770 kg (1,697.6 lb)

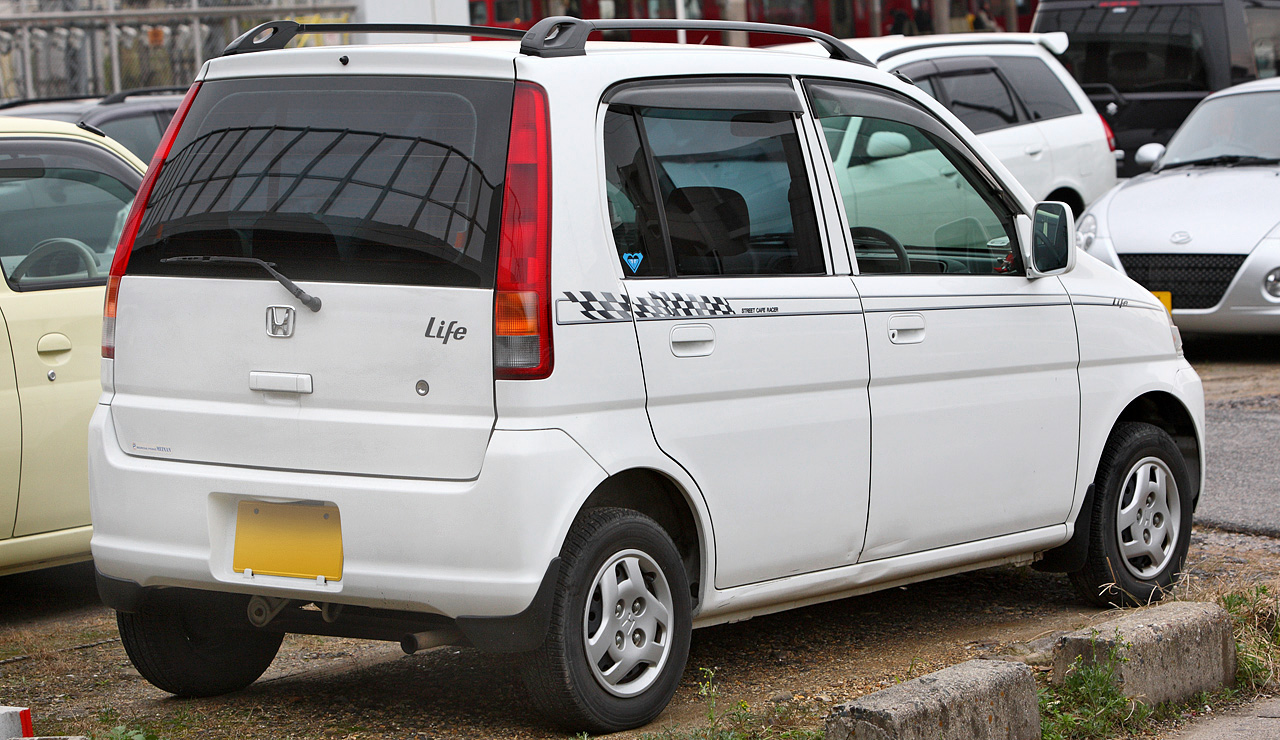
Rear view

In 1997, the Life name was resurrected for a new line of small, front-wheel-drive 5-door MPV style cars, which required a redesign for 1998 because of new Japanese tax regulations. It was a rebodied version of the JA4 Honda Today – which it also replaced – and was available exclusively in Japan at Honda Primo dealerships. This bodystyle appearance was introduced in response to the popularity of the Suzuki Wagon R, which found many buyers, and competes with the Daihatsu Cuore, Subaru Pleo, and the Mitsubishi Toppo in the "tall wagon" segment of kei cars.

It was introduced as a revision of the 1970s "StepVan" appearance, sharing the second generation Honda Today's basic componentry. Powertrain and chassis, interior and dimensions are almost identical with the Honda Today. The JA4 Honda Life is an interim model as subsequent changes in the laws regulating kei cars made it outdated very soon. This version was only built for about one and a half years. Because of this, it has become a rare car.

It used the Honda E07A engine, carried over from the Today. This 656 cc, SOHC three-cylinder with four valves per cylinder, with Honda's PGM-FI as standard equipment, puts out 48 PS (35 kW) at 6,300 rpm and 56.9 N⋅m (5.8 kg⋅m) at 5,500 rpm. It was offered with a 5-speed manual or a 3-speed automatic transmission.

It was also included with a driver side "SRS" airbag, heat absorption ultraviolet radiation glass, antibacterial steering wheel, and an antilock brake system available options. The use of one windshield wiper for the front windshield was carried over from the Honda Today. The Life was available in three grades, "B", "G", and "T". The basic B has black bumpers, doorhandles, and rear view mirrors, and 12-inch steel wheels. The G added body-coloured bumpers, power windows and locks, roof rails, rear-seat headrests, and armrests front and rear. The top T model also has body-coloured doorhandles and external mirrors, as well as 13-inch alloy wheels and climate control.

=== Chronology ===
April 18, 1997
Introduction of new JA4 model, "Life" name revived.
December 15, 1997
"Super Select" special edition introduced, based on the low-cost "B" model. This added an AM/FM tuner with cassette deck, keyless entry, driver's seat armrest, body-coloured door mirrors, bumper, door handles, hubcaps, and special seat upholstery. It went on sale on January 4, 1998.
September 1998
Production ends; sales end the following month when stock ran out

== Third generation (1998) ==
Third generation
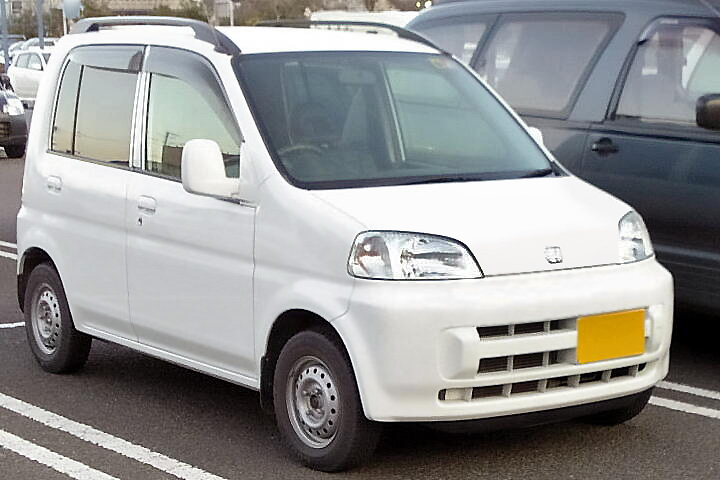
- Honda Life (pre-facelift)

Overview
- Model code: JB1-4
- Production: 1998–2003
- Assembly: Japan: Yokkaichi, Mie, Yachiyo Plant

Body and chassis
- Body style: 5–door hatchback
- Layout: Front-engine, front-wheel-drive; Front-engine, four-wheel-drive
- Related: Honda Z 2nd generation

Powertrain
- Engine: 656 cc E07Z SOHC I3; 656 cc E07Z SOHC turbo I3
- Transmission: 5-speed manual; 3-speed automatic

Dimensions
- Wheelbase: 2,360 mm (92.9 in)
- Length: 3,395 mm (133.7 in)
- Width: 1,475 mm (58.1 in)
- Height: 1,610 mm (63.4 in)
- Curb weight: 880 kg (1,940.1 lb)

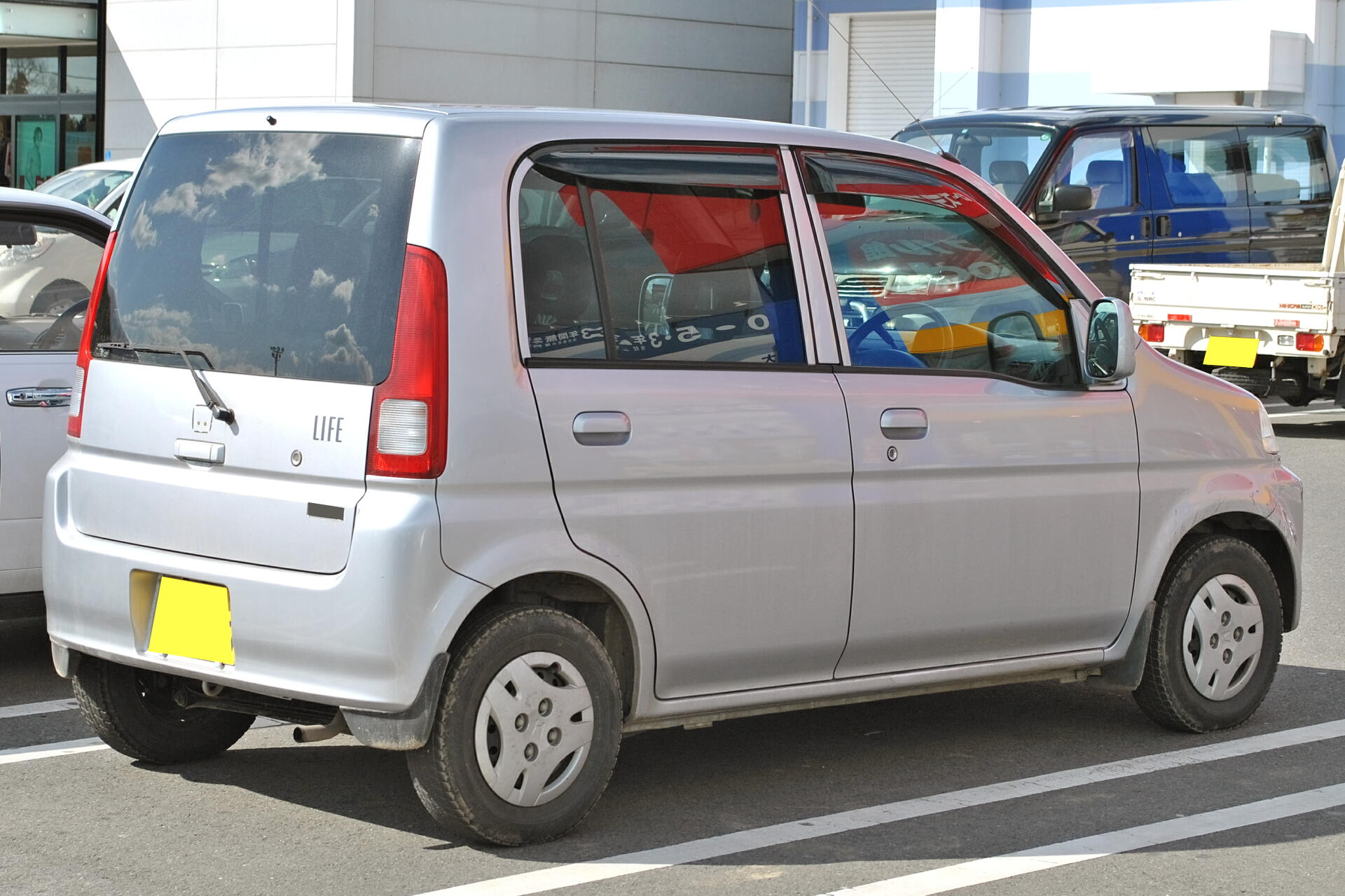
Honda Life (pre-facelift)

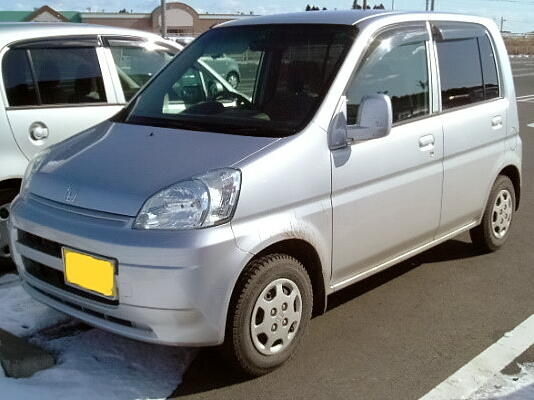

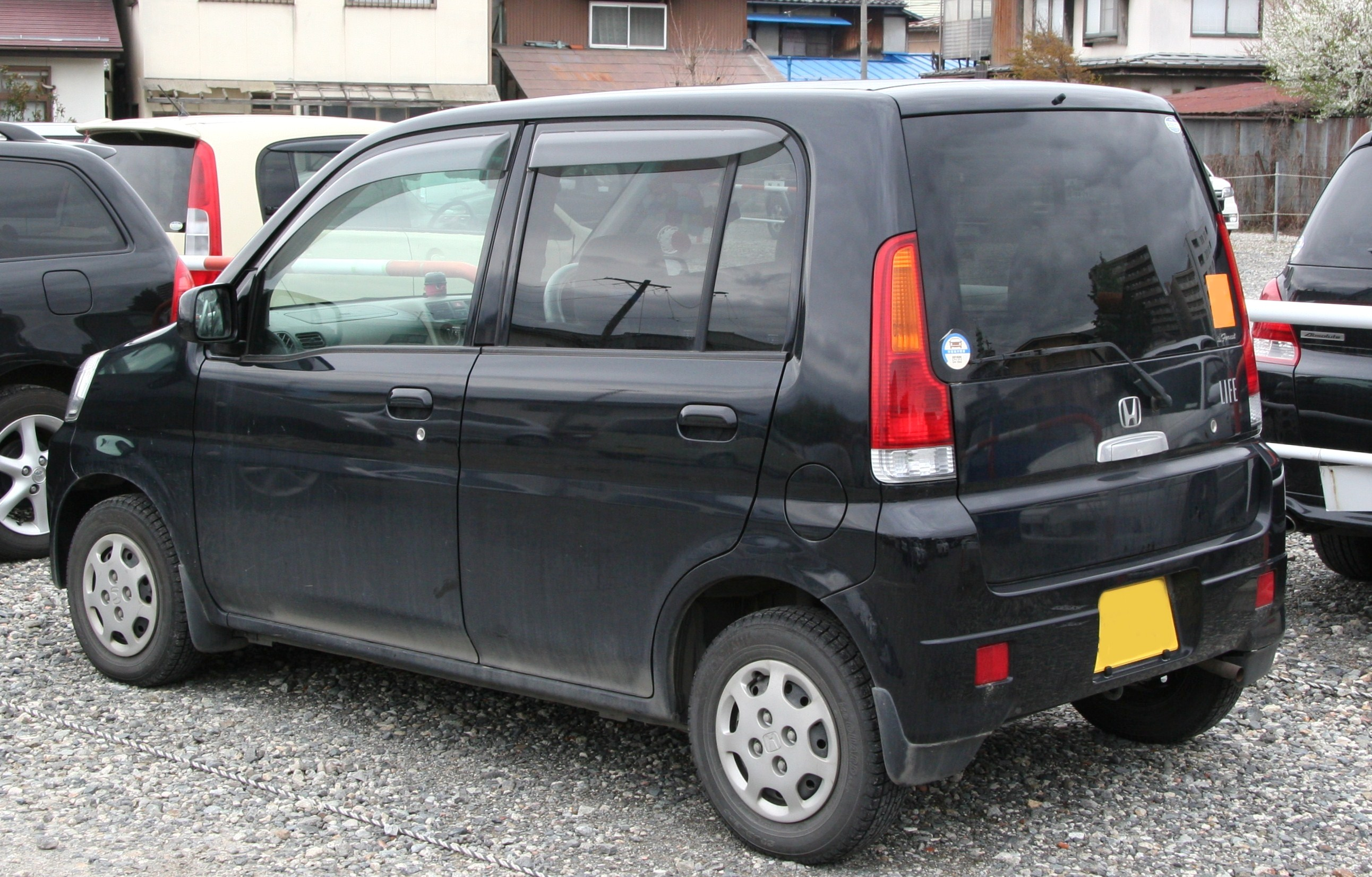
Honda Life (facelift)

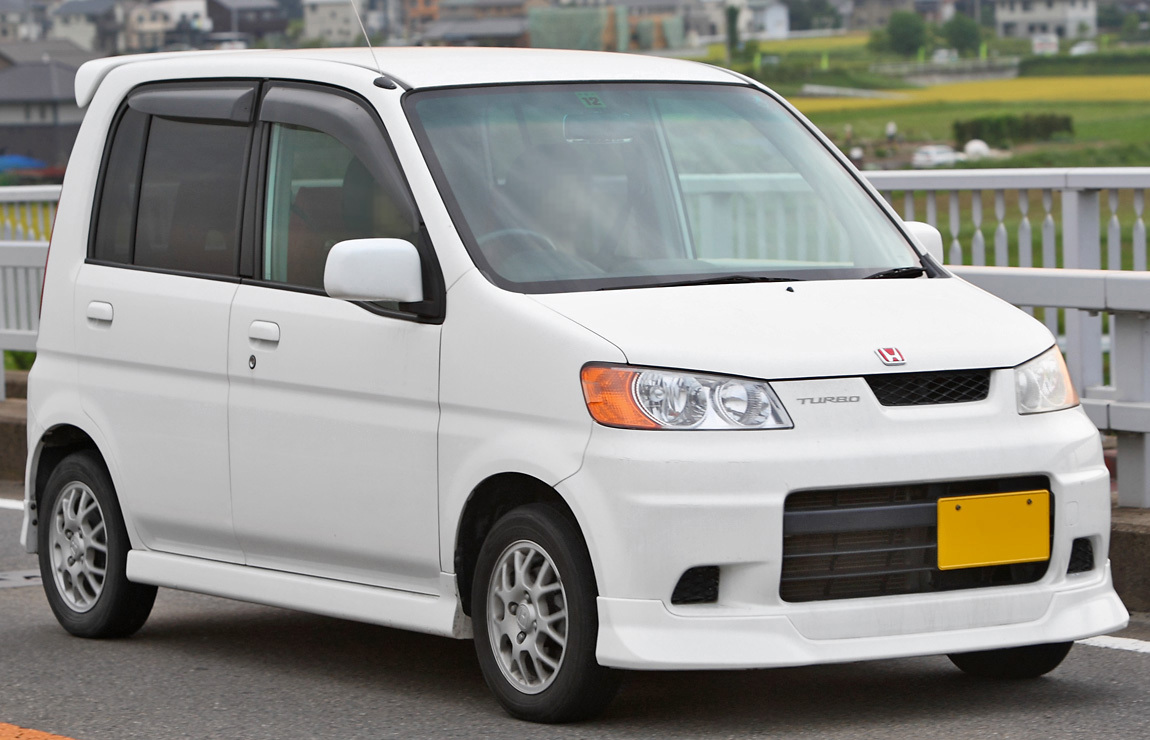

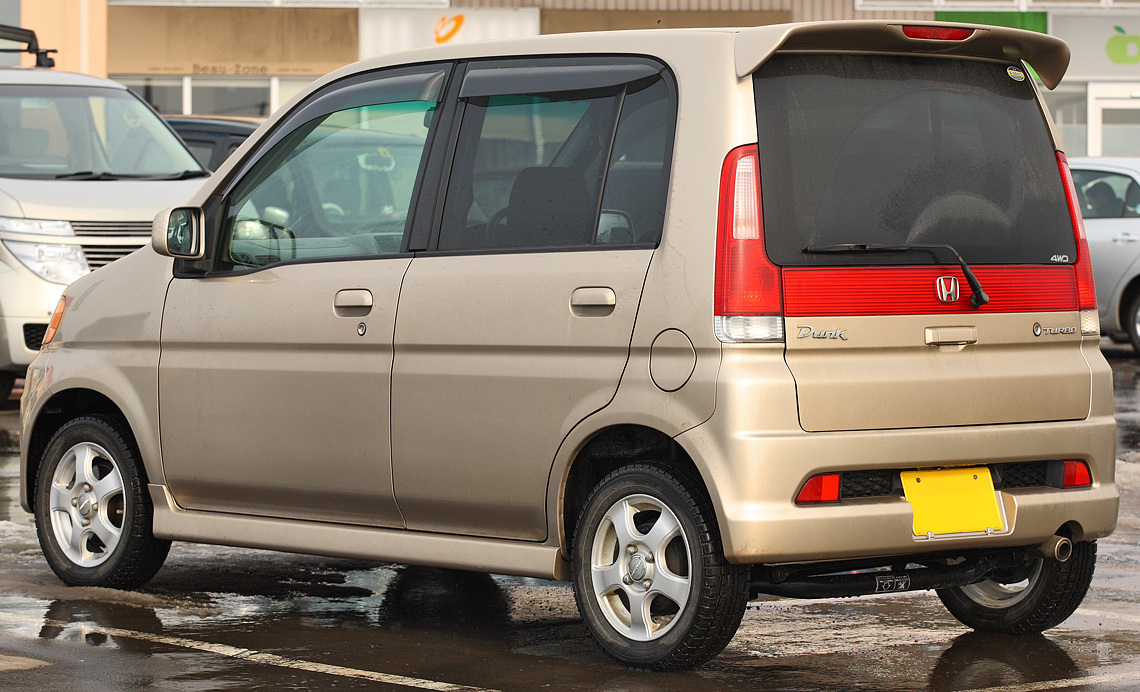
Honda Life Dunk

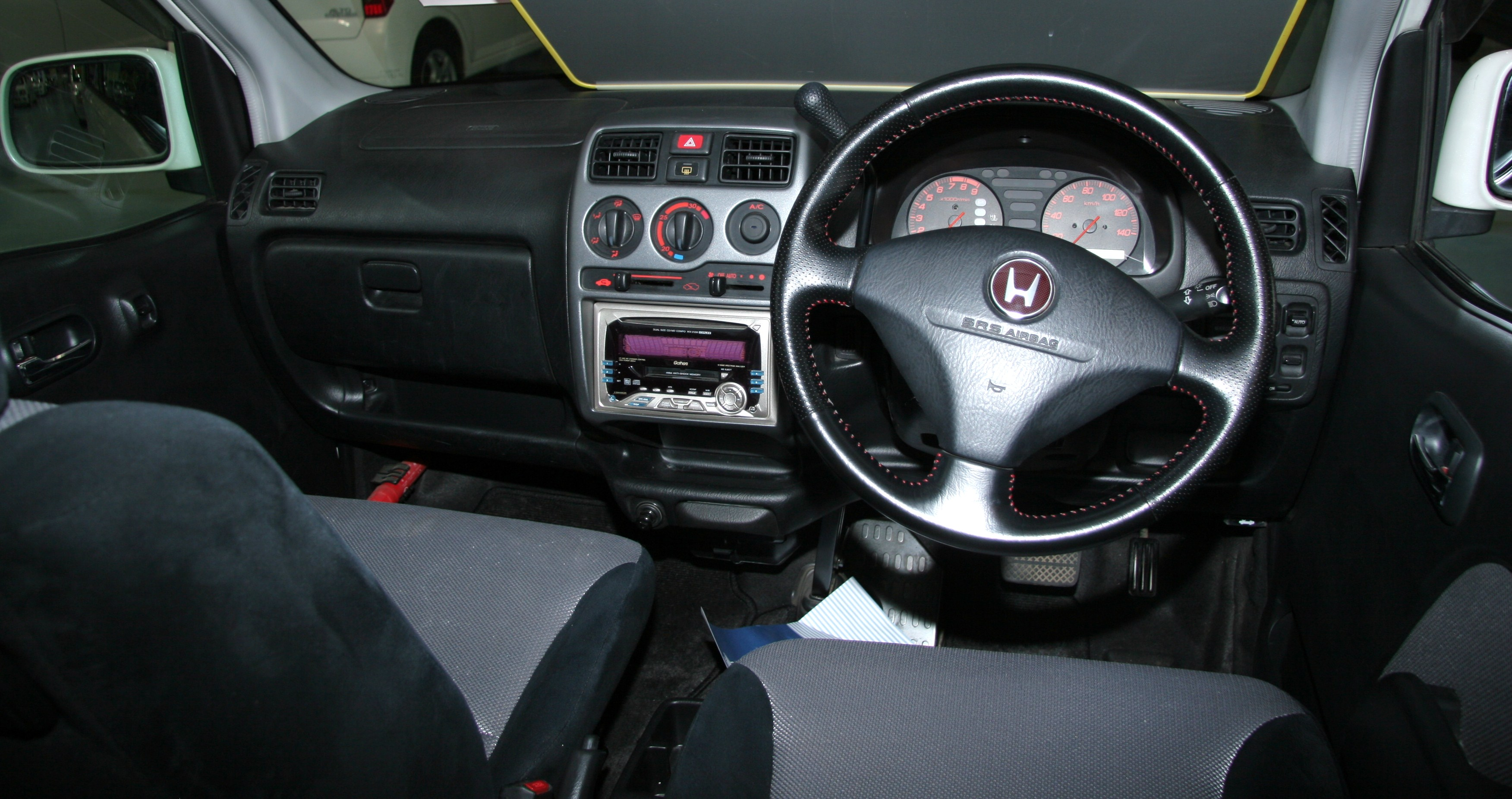
Honda Life Dunk interior

Responding to new legislation, the 1998 model (JB1) was bigger than its short-lived second generation counterpart, in length as well as width. The car kept the same side panels, but the sheetmetal in between and the windshields were new, to take full advantage of the added available width. The added length came in the form of larger bumpers, including projections at the front. It was introduced on 8 October 1998, with sales beginning the following day.

As the legal standard for kei cars was revised, the body was lengthened to 3,395 mm (133.7 in) and the width increased to 1,475 mm (58.1 in), which allowed for improvements in collision safety performance. Safety was increased further by the SRS airbags which are also standard equipment, also in the passenger seat. The initial range consisted of the basic B, the more comfortable G, and the well-equipped T model at the top of the line. The B has air conditioning, 12-inch steel wheels, door handles and rear view mirrors in black plastic, and no headrests in the rear seats. The G has 13-inch steel wheels with hubcaps and rear headrests as standard, as well as keyless entry and power windows. The T model adds alloy wheels, roof rails, body-coloured doorhandles and mirrors, a CD player, and climate control. The T was renamed L in May 2000, adding tinted glass at the rear.

Corresponding to the enlargement of the second generation body, the engine was changed from the E07A to the improved E07Z. Torque at low engine speeds was improved by about 20 percent, while the engine also became compliant with low-emission vehicle (LEV) requirements. Power increased marginally, with peak power up to 50 PS (37 kW). The 5-speed manual and 3-speed automatic transmissions were basically carried over from the second generation, although a column-mounted shifter was adopted for the automatic. The option of a four-wheel drive powertrain was new for the third generation; this was given the JB2 chassis number.

In December 2000, a turbocharged variant named Honda Life Dunk was introduced. This has a sportier appearance, with more aggressively styled headlamps, a large opening in the front bumper, and an asymmetric grille. The Honda Life Dunk (and the Honda That's) were listed by Forbes magazine as among the weirdest car names. The Life Dunk was given new model codes; JB3 for the front-wheel drive model and JB4 for the four-wheel drive one.

"Kei-Mover" appeared as a new version in the lineup. Practicality, safety, and environmental performance were prioritized, improving economic efficiency.

=== Chronology ===
1999 December 16
"G", based on privacy glass (rear tailgate) door mirrors door handles tailgate handles outer body same colour, remote control electric door mirrors, CD player etc. equipped & AM / FM tuner, and a cloth seat covers only special edition models employing the side door linings clad "Minuet" was released.
2000 May 15
The traditional "T" instead of the, CD player with AM / FM tuner, automatic air conditioning, privacy glass (rear tailgate), and equipped with electric remote door mirror body same colour door handles, full performance and comfortable "L "was added.
2000 October 19
"G" on the base, equipped with door handles and tailgate handles outer body having the same remote control electric door mirrors, Audio-less specification and customized for sensitive, special pricing $ 200 cheaper than car-based specification car, "select" was released.
2000 December 20
A redesigned model with a turbocharged engine called the Honda Life Dunk was introduced
2001 May 24
Minor changes made. Change the front design, multi-reflector headlights were two-lamp. Also, "L" side mirror is change the landscape design, the new design of alloy wheels and full wheel caps. In addition to employing plated outer door handles tailgate larger part in the grade. "L" is also adopted plated door handles. In addition, the ground sheet to change the gray tones, "B" driver's power window switches add lighting in all grades except. 2DIN size of the audio space to expand, "B" also set the audio specification in all grades except less, "L" is also provided on the rear seat armrest. In addition, all types of "Excellent -" low emission certified as well, which also improves fuel efficiency. In addition, special edition models were released as "Minuet" will make the changes above specifications were upgraded to Grade catalog.
2001 November 15
Turbo specification derived vehicles "Life Dunk" special edition models "TS Special" · "TR Special" was released. The former is "TS" is based on privacy glass, rear garnish, CD player with AM / FM tuner, while with the metallic centre panel, the specification deals with 1.7 million yen less than the base model, the latter with AM / FM tuner MD / CD tuner, while prices were unchanged spec with leather-wrapped shift knob. Incidentally, the latter being also set the audio less specification.
2001 December 13

"Minuet", based on half the front window shade, MD / CD player with AM / FM tuner, special edition models equipped with a metallic centre panel "Minuet DX" was released.

2002 January 24
"G" on the base, equipped with privacy glass, "Minuet" adopting seat is equipped, special edition models were set up $ 500 cheaper than car-based "forum" was released. The set also only eight colours plus colour body colour.
2002 August 22

"Life," "Life Dunk" both made minor changes. "Life" is a full grade, "Minuet" and richer, the metallic centre panel and front windows half-shade, as well as with the MD / CD player with AM / FM tuner, while making a high quality seat upholstery, 10,000 yen than before the Price. "G" is also equipped with privacy glass, while making a high quality seat upholstery, Price was $500 here than before. Other, "L"-equipped MD / CD player with AM / FM tuner. The body colour is a "topic" to add the colour was only three colours, including those of colour was 10. "Dunk" is equipped with interior grade casual outside the newly dedicated "Diva (Diva)" was set. Others, along with applying a blue coating on reflector headlights, "TR" alloy wheels in a gunmetal colour, the sheet was subjected to silver stitching, a 6-dash CD changer and MD players association with AM / FM tuner and the driver's seat armrest the equipment. In addition, body colour was added.

2002 December 5
"G" is based on, while with the metallic centre panel and remote control door mirrors retractable electric body same colour, cheaper 50,000 yen more than the base car, the car FF · MT, as well as 900,000 yen in the car FF · AT special edition models with prices set off a "super-topic" was released.
2003 May 15
"G", based on a December 2002 release "Super topic" The equipment, CD player with AM / FM tuner, 2 rear speakers, special edition models equipped with front door to add water repellent door mirror + " Topic Super CD "sale. 9 colours colour body has set a new colour and contains three colours.

== Fourth generation (2003) ==
Fourth generation
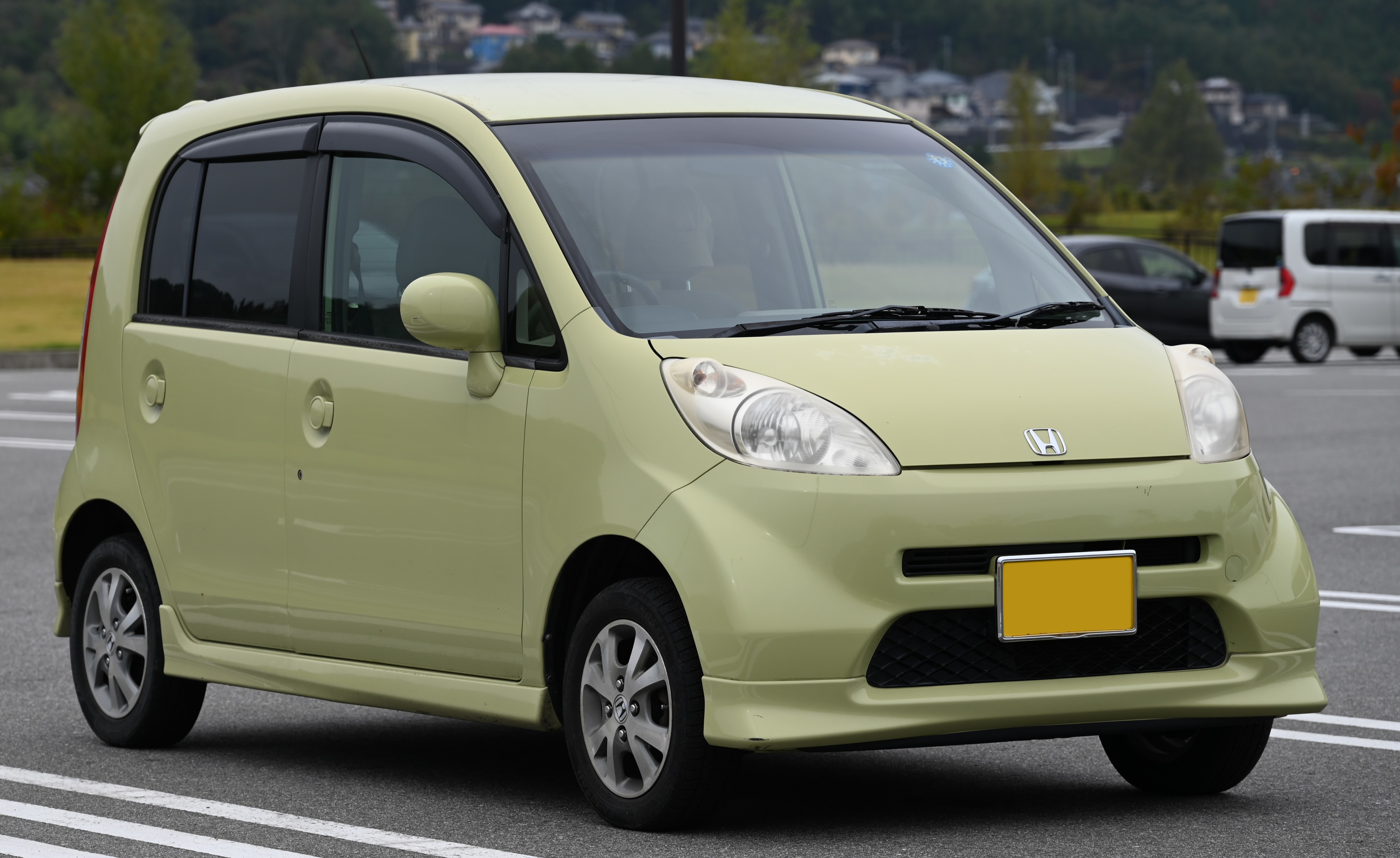
- Honda Life (pre-facelift)

Overview
- Model code: JB5-8
- Production: September 2003 – November 2008
- Assembly: Yachiyo Plant, Yokkaichi, Mie, Japan

Body and chassis
- Body style: 5-door hatchback
- Layout: Front-engine, front-wheel-drive; Front-engine, four-wheel-drive

Powertrain
- Engine: 658 cc P07A SOHC I3; 658 cc P07A SOHC turbo I3
- Transmission: 4-Speed Automatic Overdrive

Dimensions
- Wheelbase: 2,420 mm (95.3 in)
- Length: 3,395 mm (133.7 in)
- Width: 1,475 mm (58.1 in)
- Height: 1,580 mm (62.2 in) (FF); 1,595 mm (62.8 in) (4WD)
- Curb weight: 860 kg (1896 lb)

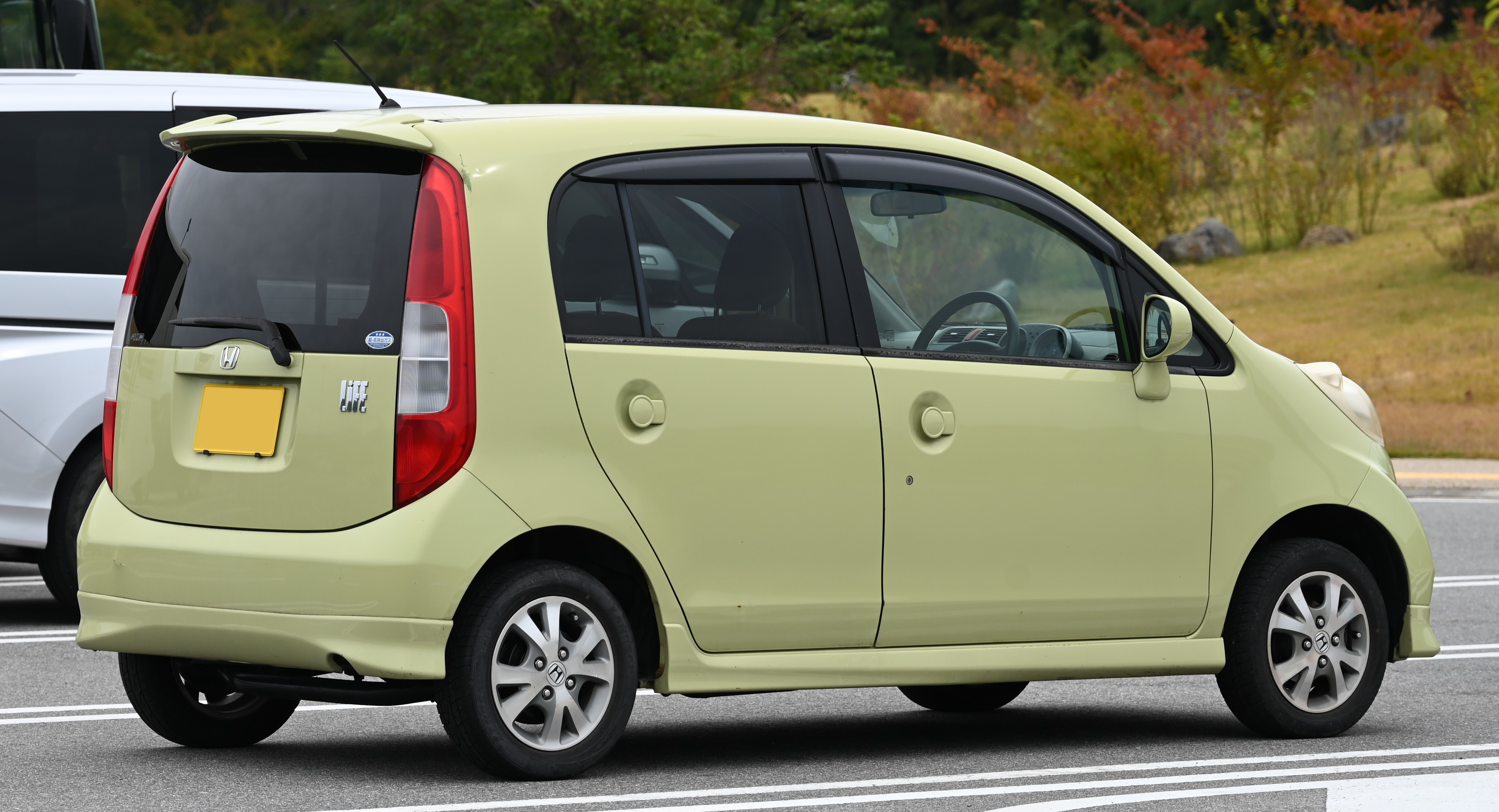
Honda Life (pre-facelift)

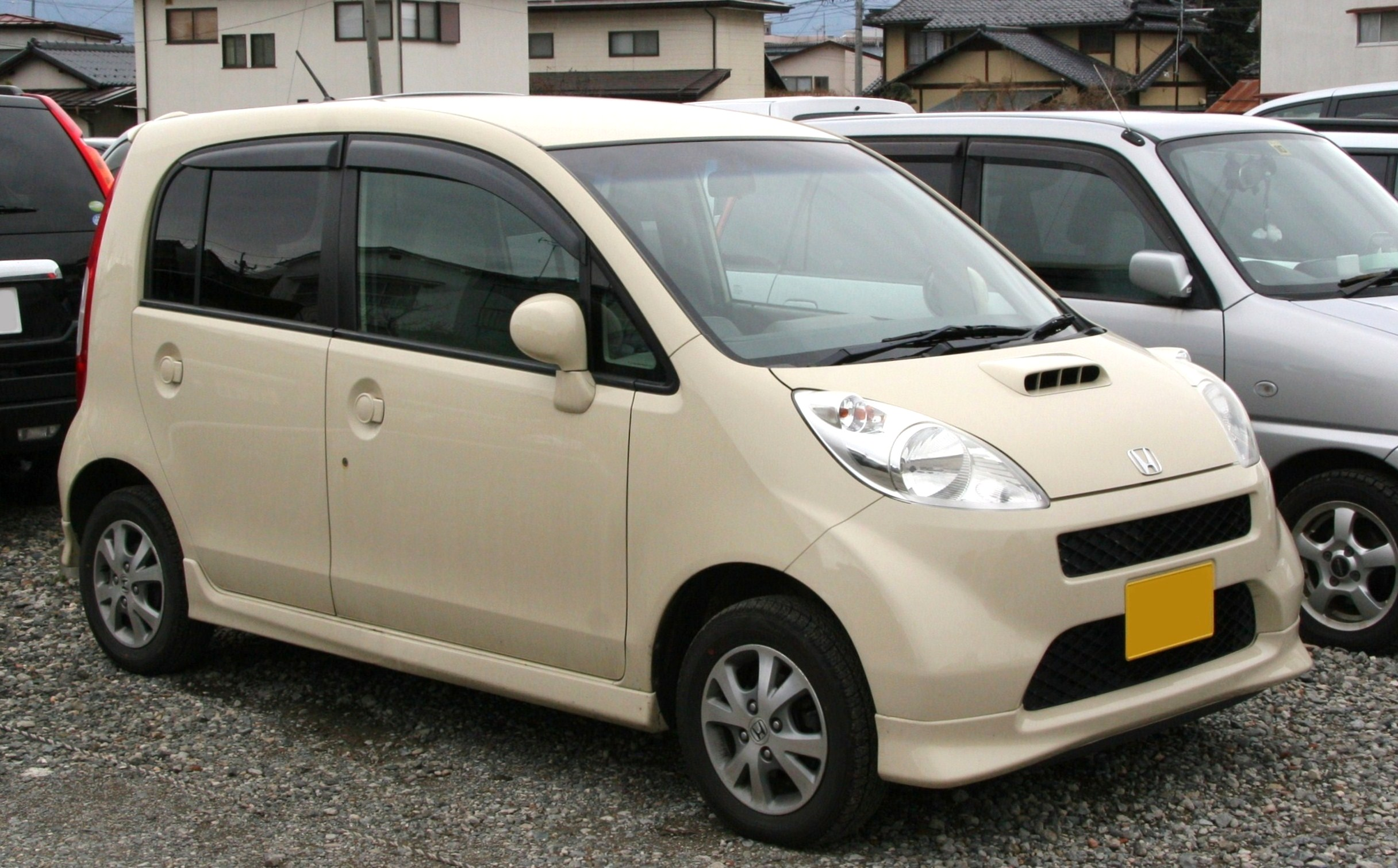
Honda Life Turbo (pre-facelift)

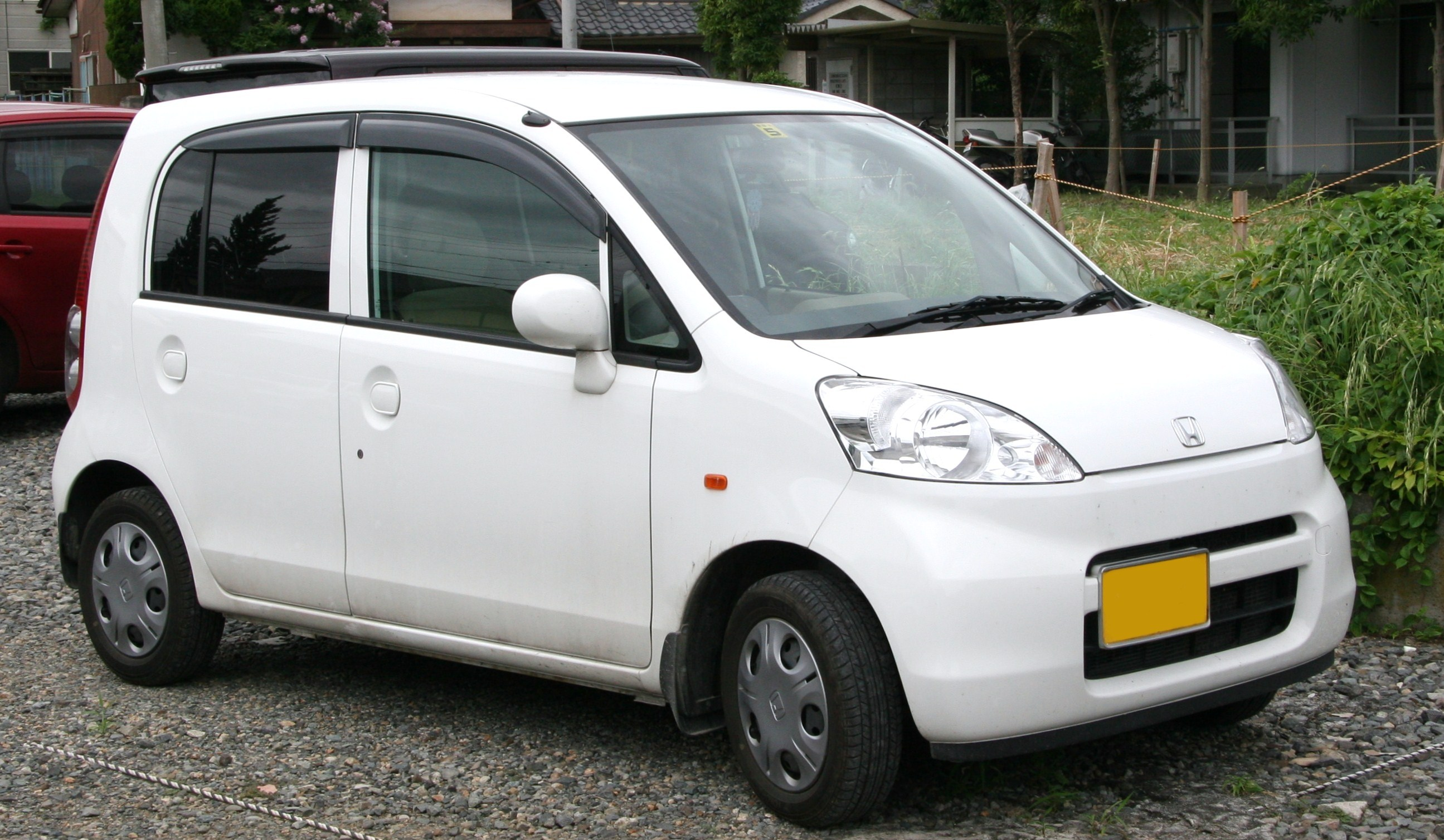

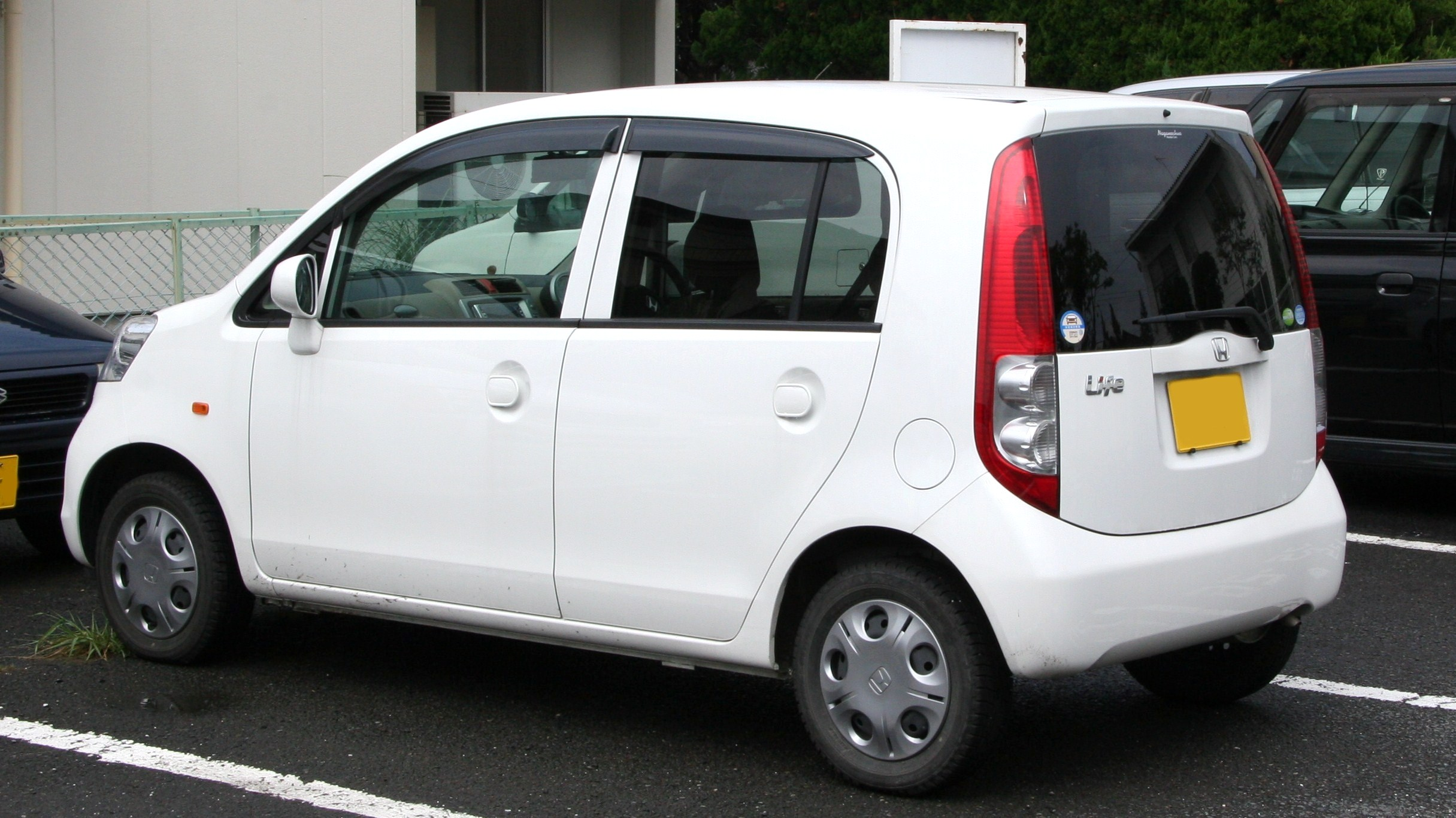
Honda Life (facelift)

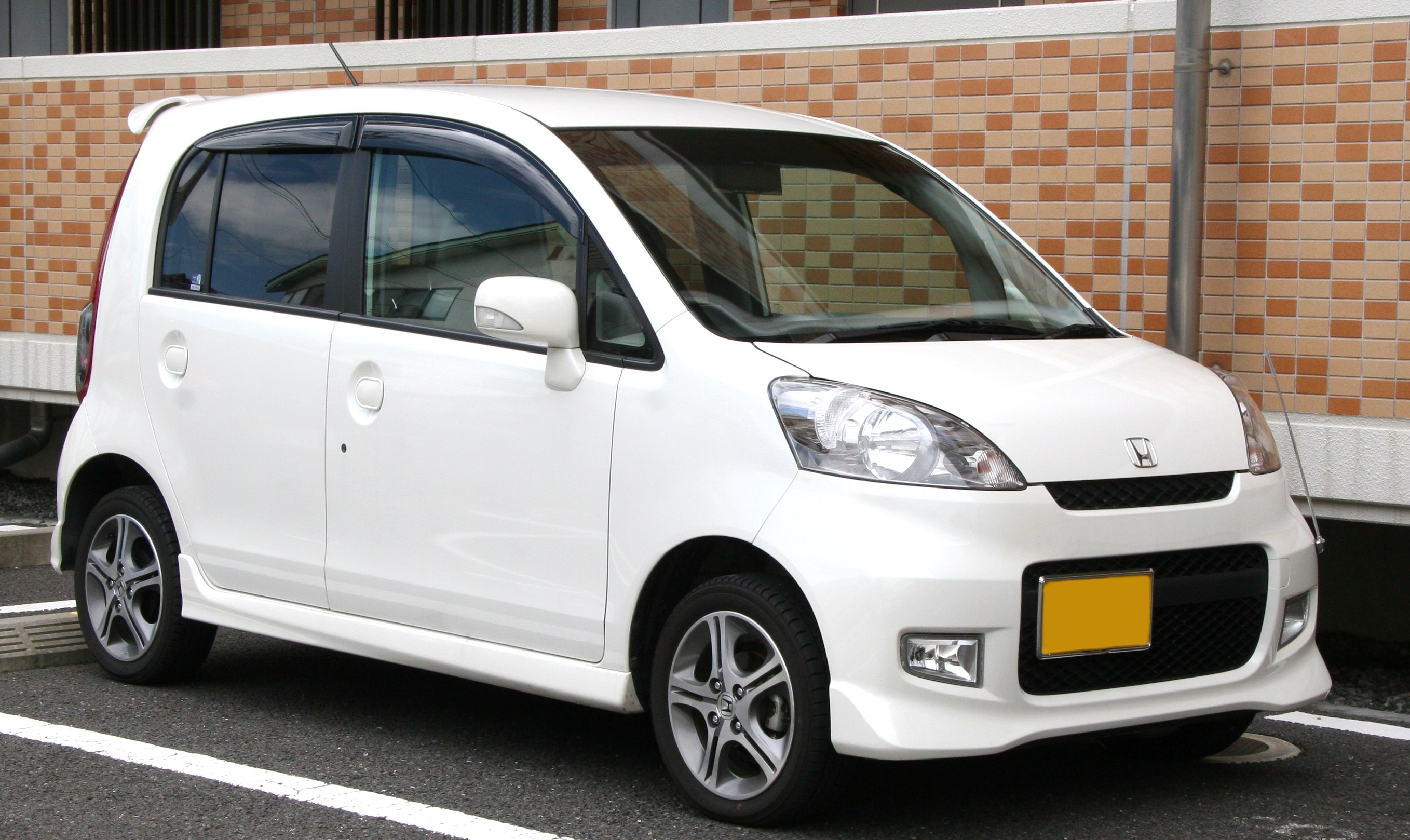

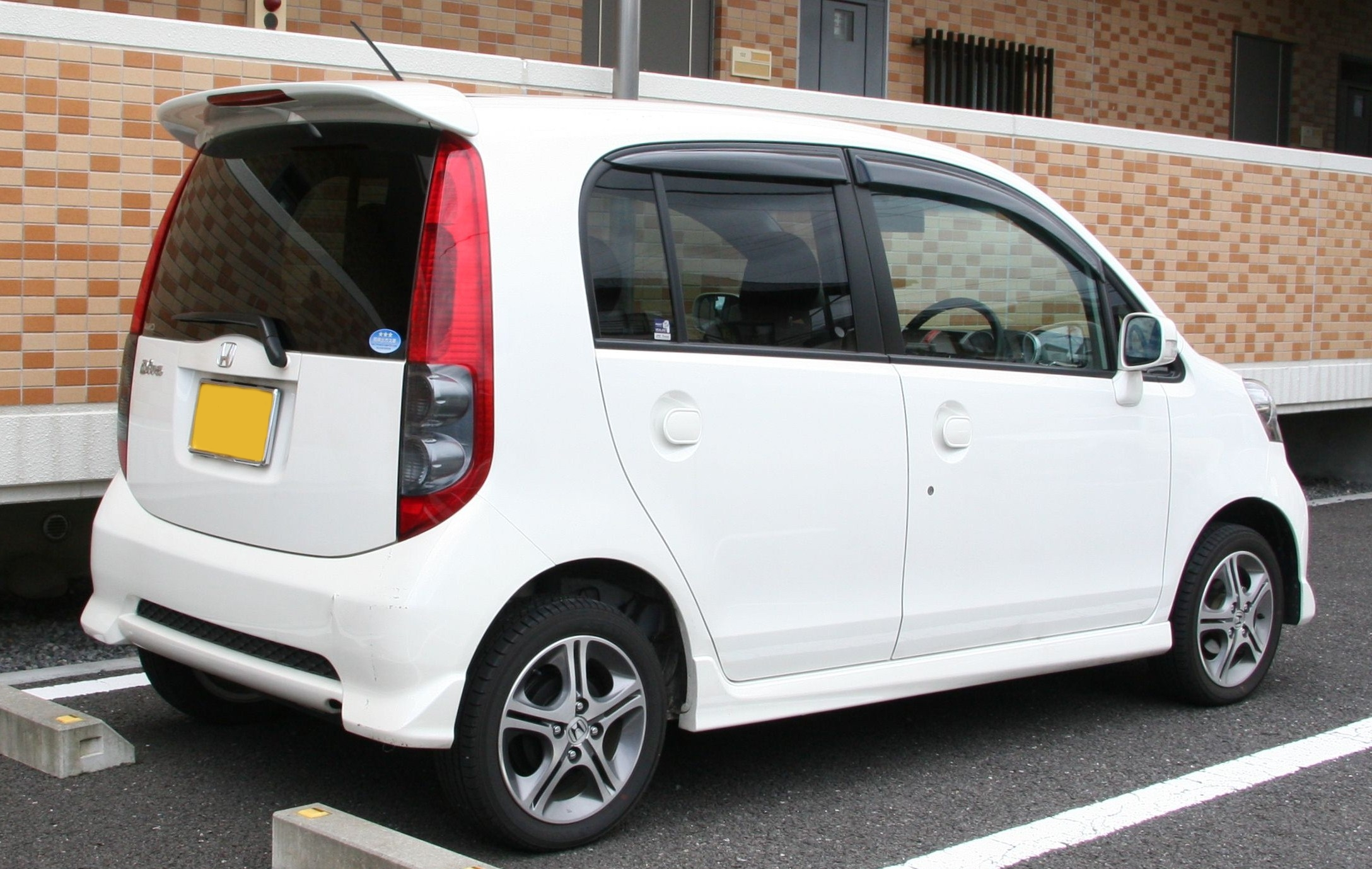
Honda Life Diva (facelift)

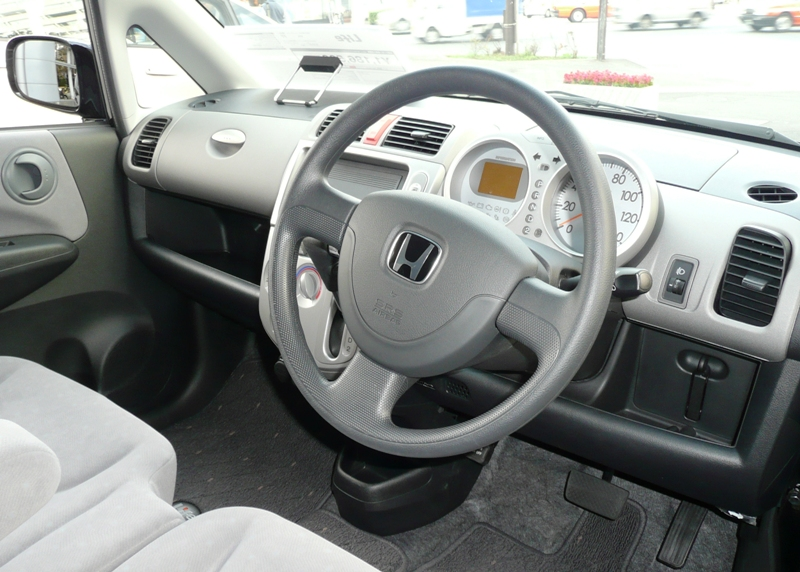
Interior

September 2003 saw the Life updated with a new 660 cc three-cylinder engine. An optional turbocharger, mated to a 4-speed automatic transmission and optional 4-wheel drive are also available. The safety features were significantly improved and engine emissions were reduced. A triangle window was placed at the mounting point of wing mirrors in the third generation vehicle.

In 2005, Honda introduced the DIVA model, which included aerodynamic styling and aluminium wheels.

Unlike the predecessor body, "Honda's design made good" (advertising slogan in Japan) was the theme of a more rounded style. The newly developed Honda engine Type P07A 660cc SOHC 6 valve inline 3-cylinder with i-DSi of naturally aspirated (52PS) and Turbo (64PS) has increased horsepower. The transmission will only be AT, was a four-speed transmission. Placed next to the speedometer display is a multifunction display, including the emphasis on interior appearance than on price, and ride quality. Easy to grip in any direction, the circular door handles are said to be influenced by an ice cream spoon. The percentage of products purchased were expecting a higher percentage of young women buyers have come up mainly in emphasis towards drivability. The equipment grades were "C", "F", and "D", all three also available with the turbocharged engine. The turbo models were no longer given the separate "Life Dunk" name.

=== 2007 change ===
2007 models started production on 2006-10-05. It marked the first use of Honda Smart Parking Assist System in a production Honda vehicle.

==== DIVA Special ====
It is a model went on sale in 2006-06-07.

==== F Happy Special ====
It is a model went on sale in 2007-11-8.

==== C Specials ====
C Comfort Special and C Fine Special went on sale on December 20, 2007.

=== Chronology ===
2003 September 5
A full model change made to the fourth. The turbo cars a month after October 06 was released in the beginning. 15,000 monthly sales goal.
2004 April 22
"F", "F Turbo" is based on 13-inch alloy wheels and aerodynamic, sporty appearance was well equipped with discharge headlights, which also features a special MD / CD player with AM / FM tuner and Micro-antenna specification car "F · Aero premium" was released.
2004 October 14
Made some improvements. "F" is added to the interior colour gray, "D" that was set was also employed in the front bench seat. "D" is a fully automatic air conditioner with a new standard. In addition, special edition models were released in April 2005 "F · Aero Premium" by changing the price of 80,000 options to manufacturers MD / CD player with AM / FM tuner with discharge headlights were standard conventional Price was a circle. Replacement system made with body colour Blue and Pearl White. Because of the improved fuel economy, "C Turbo" · "F Turbo" of FF cars' fuel efficiency standards + 5% 2010 "has been achieved.
2004 December 24
"F", based on aero parts, smoke type rear combination lamps, 14-inch alloy wheels in an exclusive colour, half-shade front window, while equipped with a micro antenna, car audio less specification and special edition 'Divas ( DIVA) "was released. The "Diva" grade name is derived from the third car, "Life Dunk," and due to additional minor revival since "Life" is set as the first time. The body colour is only set the colour.
2005 February 3
"C" on the base, equipped with privacy glass, special specification car audio less specification "C · Style" and announced the next day February 04 started from the sale.
2005 August 25
"F" on the base, equipped with 13 inch alloy wheels, car audio less specification and special edition "F · Style" was released.
2005 October 21
Made some improvements. Special edition models were released in December 2004 "Diva (DIVA)" has received favorable order, was promoted to Grade catalog. Only a new front grille, smoked headlight garnish plated, and 14-inch alloy wheels adopted an exclusive colour. The new spec turbo "Turbo Diva" along with adding a turbo to the existing grade of "F Turbo" diaphragm, reviewing the structure type. In addition, all grades side turn lamp, high mounted stop lamps, headlights as standard equipment with leveling, "C" for all grades except the built-in mechanical keys "Honda Smart Key System" option added to the manufacturer. In addition, the two-wheel-drive cars all gained SU-LEV certification as their emissions levels were 75 percent lower than required by Japan's 2005 emission standards. Body colour and three colours predecessor had been set to "Diva" has added colour two colours only. The "Happy Edition" special edition was released on 21 October as well. It was based on the "F" model, with fully automatic air conditioning with an air clean filter, tinted band on top of the front window, and a keyless entry-integrated system.
2006 September 28
Minor changes made. To support the new steering when parking back "Honda Smart Parking Assist System (simple type of voice guidance only)" to "Happy Edition" · "F Turbo", "Diva" · "Diva Turbo" in FF was a factory option on each car. Furthermore, "F" and "Diva" is the security alarm, high-performance deodorant filter-free allele, is standard on this new integrated keyless entry key 2. The exterior front, headlights, rear combination lamps, such as door handles redesigned. "Diva" will change the design of aero bumper, side mirror turn signal was adopted. "Turbo Diva" has also been equipped with front fog lights further. In addition, the type that is offset to the right the previous year's position was in the middle of the front license plate. ," LIFEalso' logo will change when the second generation model 4 "LiFE" instead, the second time since the late addition of type "Life" next, go from right to left position of the previous year type rear emblem, "Diva" is "Life" instead of "Diva" emblems are mounted only. At the same time, special edition models released in October 2005 "Happy Edition" With the change of the base model specification was changed to the front window shade half the special equipment and fully automatic air conditioner. In addition, "C", based on a rear wiper with washer and ABS + Brake Assist with EBD (cars only FF) and to not equipped with a black tailgate garnish (cars only FF) special edition models equipped with a "topic", then went on sale from October 05.
2007 June 7
"DIVA", based on special edition models equipped with front fog lights and full auto air conditioning "Special" and "C" is based on, ABS + Brake Assist with EBD, instead of omitting the privacy glass, multi-angle outer door handles (coloured), special edition models equipped with "super-topic" was released.
In 2007 November 8
"F" based on, Honda Smart Key System, Automatic Climate Control, CD Player with AM / FM tuner, half-shade front window, door mirror equipped with a special edition models turn "Happy Special" was released.
In 2007 December 20
"C" special edition models based on a "special comfort," "Fine Special" release. Both ??, CD player with AM / FM tuner, multi-angle outer door handles (coloured), and equipped with high performance deodorant filter-free alleles, the former specification is also equipped with full remote control coloured retractable electric door mirrors with Automatic Climate Control the latter is omitted specification deals with ABS + EBD brake assist

=== Specifications ===
Engine is rated 52 PS (38 kW; 51 hp) at 6,700 rpm and 61 N⋅m (45 lb⋅ft) at 3,800 rpm for non-turbo model, and 64 PS (47 kW; 63 hp) at 6,000 rpm and 93 N⋅m (69 lb⋅ft) at 4,000 rpm for the turbo model.

model	DIVA	DIVA Turbo	F, F Happy Edition	F Turbo	C, C Topic
model name (FF/4WD)	Honda DBA-JB5/CBA-JB6	Honda DBA-JB7/CBA-JB8	Honda DBA-JB5/CBA-JB6	Honda DBA-JB7/CBA-JB8	Honda DBA-JB5/CBA-JB6
ground clearance	155 mm (6.1 in)				
turning radius	4.7 m (15 ft)		4.5 m (15 ft)		
tire (front/rear)	165/55R14 72V		155/65R13 73S		

== Fifth generation (2008) ==
Fifth generation
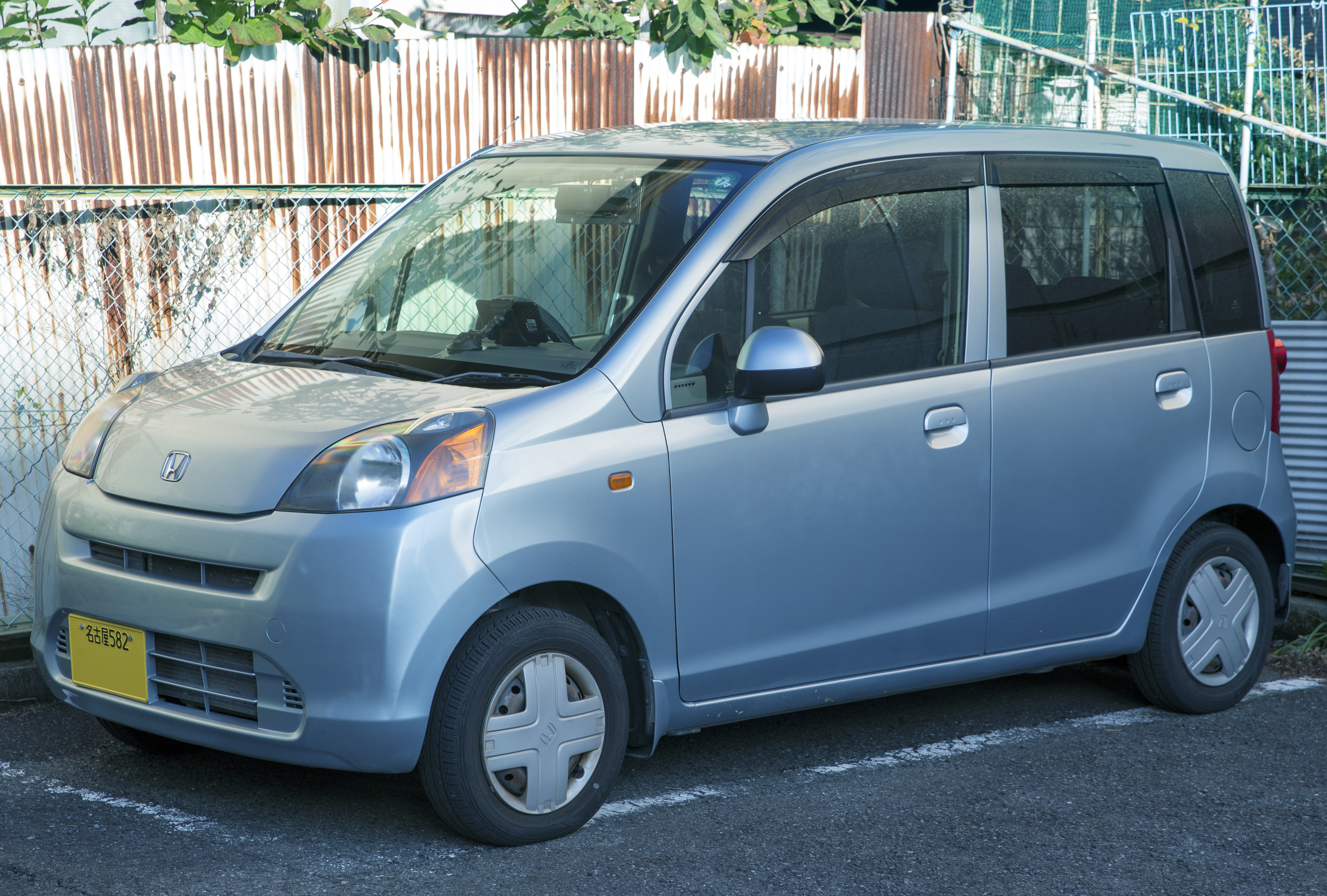

Overview
- Model code: JC1-2
- Production: 2008–2014
- Assembly: Yachiyo Plant, Yokkaichi, Mie, Japan

Body and chassis
- Body style: 5-door hatchback
- Layout: Front-engine, front-wheel-drive; Front-engine, four-wheel-drive
- Related: Honda Zest

Powertrain
- Engine: 658 cc P07A SOHC I3; 658 cc P07A SOHC turbo I3
- Transmission: 4-Speed Automatic Overdrive

Dimensions
- Wheelbase: 2,420 mm (95.3 in)
- Length: 3,395 mm (133.7 in)
- Width: 1,475 mm (58.1 in)
- Height: 1,610 mm (63.4 in) (FF); 1,630 mm (64.2 in) (4WD)
- Curb weight: 810–940 kg (1,786–2,072 lb)

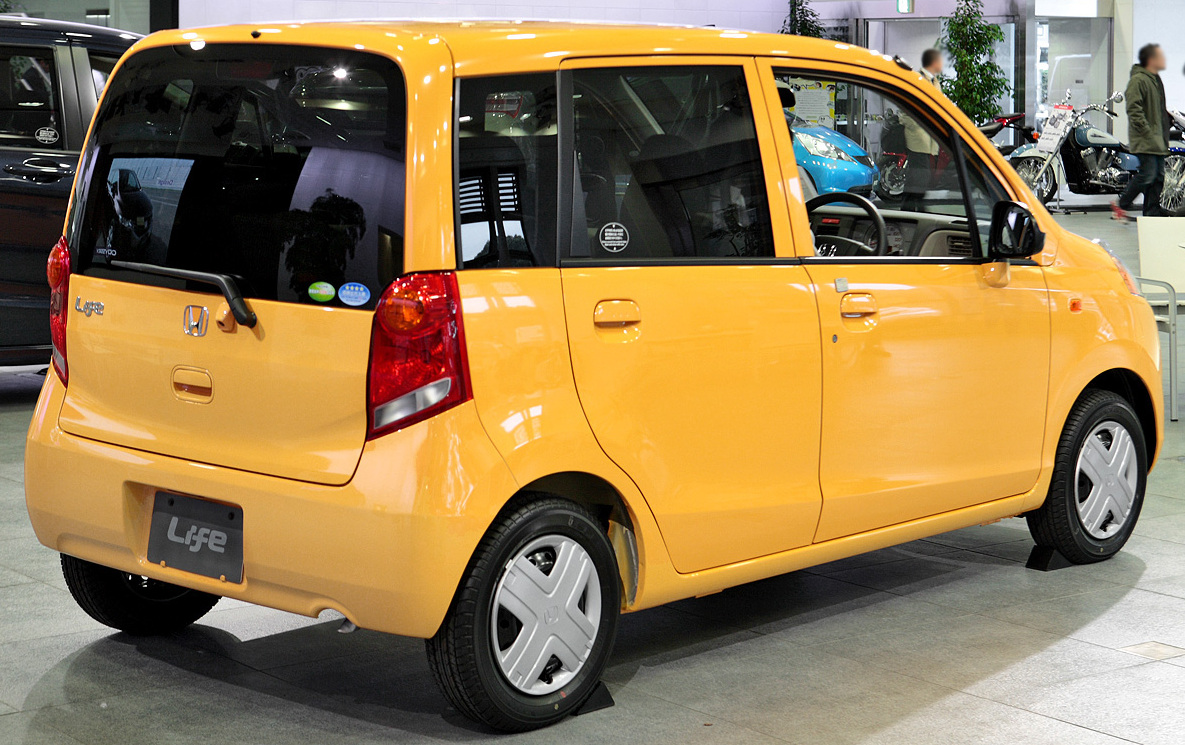
Rear view

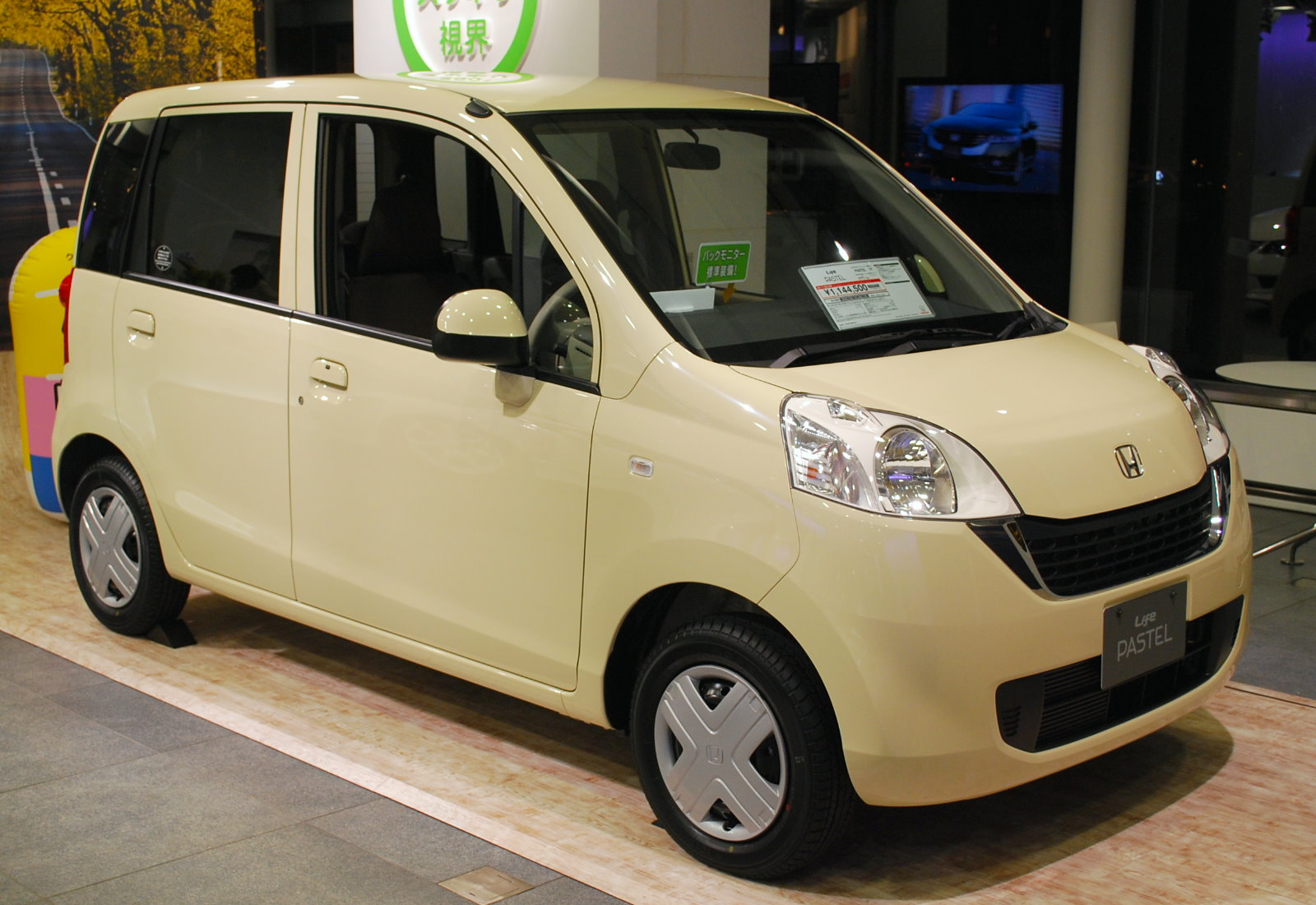

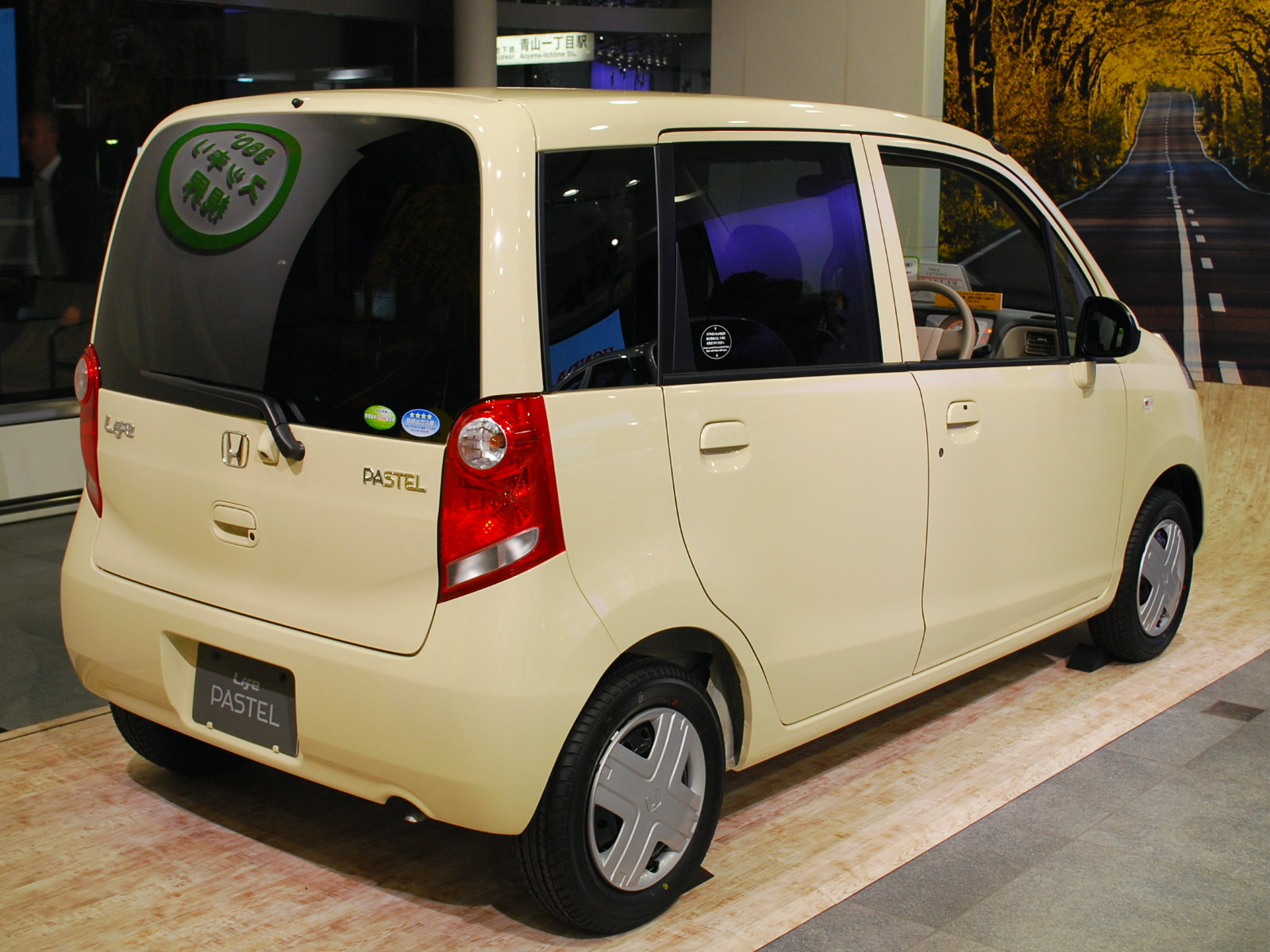
Honda Life Pastel

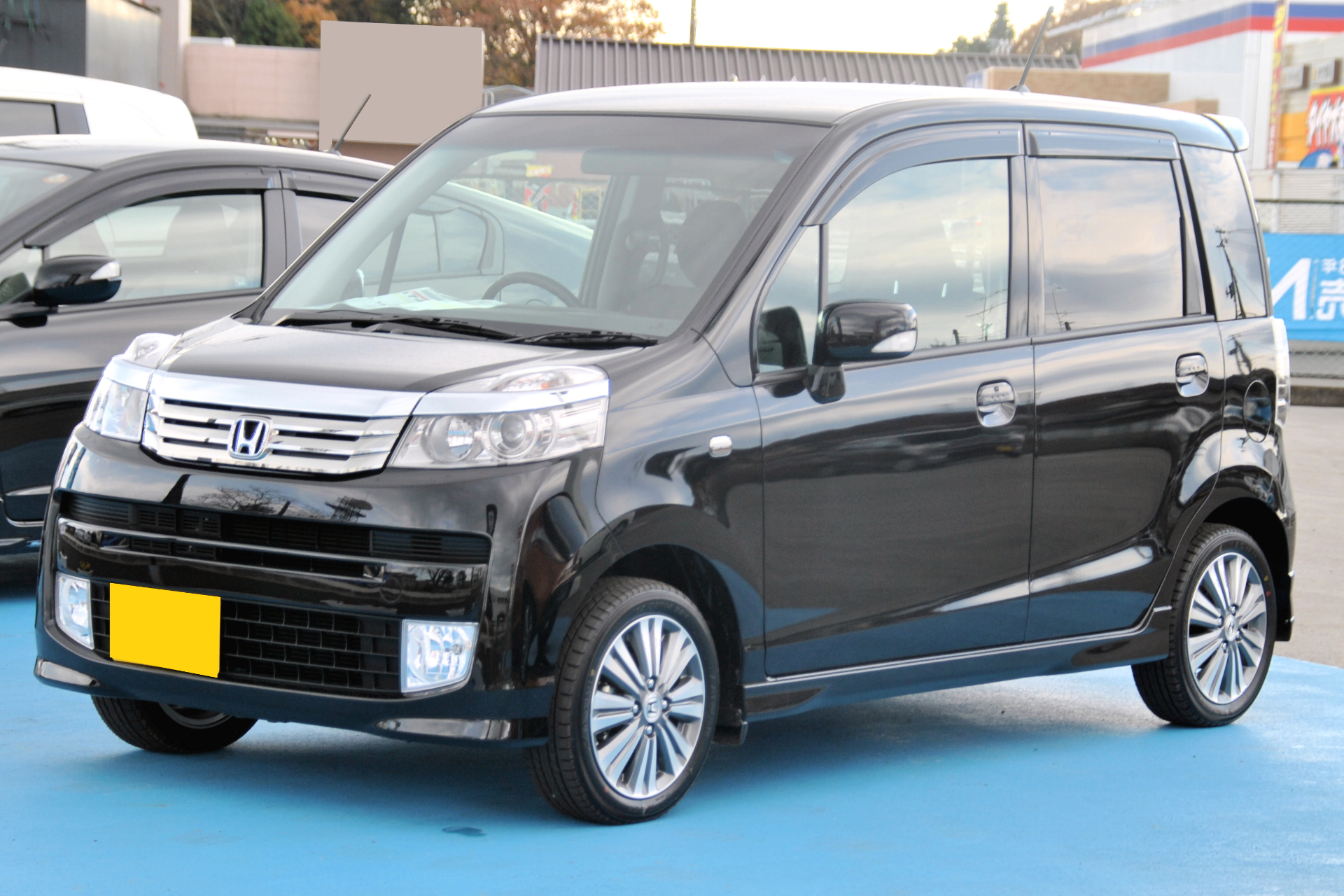
Honda Life Diva (facelift)

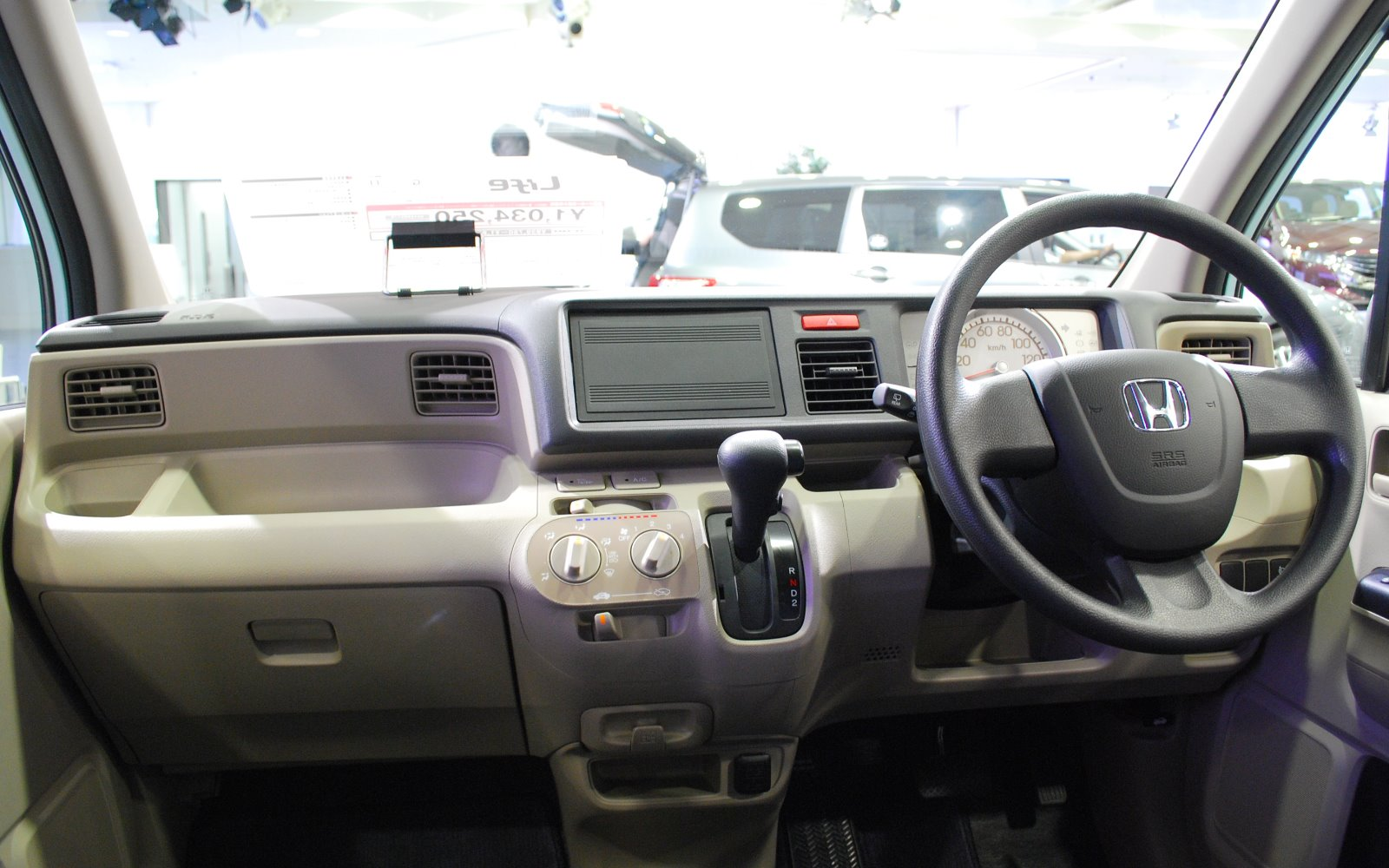
Interior

In November 2008, Honda introduced the fifth generation Life. This generation is available in C, G, PASTEL, PASTEL turbo, DIVA, DIVA turbo. A model with different sheet metal, marketed towards a younger crowd is called the Honda Zest. Built from 2006 until 2012, the Zest shares all mechanicals with the Life.

=== Specifications ===
It keeps on using Honda P07A engine from the previous generation. The naturally aspirated engine is rated 52 PS (38 kW; 51 hp) at 7100 rpm and 60 N⋅m (44 lb⋅ft) at 3600 rpm, and 64 PS (47 kW; 63 hp) at 6000 rpm and 93 N⋅m (69 lb⋅ft) at 4000 rpm for the turbo model, which is available in PASTEL and DIVA models.

Vehicle code:

- DBA-JC1: FF
- CBA-JC2: 4WD

2008 September 18, and in the press release, and continuously changing the amount of air bags, the emissions control for the driver's seat called the "ECO" button that displays encouragement for driving eco-friendly, and high protection performance and low-impact "i-SRS airbag system "(the force deployed during an impact is measured against many variables) was announced to be built into the fifth generation Honda Life. October "teaser ad" started the introduction to the Japanese market, the "Casual" trim package represented the standard equipment trim package, the "G type", and the sporty grade "DIVA" in addition to the new grade enhanced the addition of the fashionably equipped "PASTEL" trim package.

In the fifth generations exterior styling is an interpretation of a "daily smile technology" approach. The original concept has been taken into account in particular the ease of operation. Front narrow pillars and lower door sash, with a large integrated triangle window in the front doors, a front windshield wiper review of the side front position, the waistline and front passenger outward view optimization, adoption of the rear quarter windows, the size of the tailgate window and rear seat review of the shape of the seat back, the embedded headlight inclusion, have improved the appearance of the front side and rear view over the previous generation.

Vehicle Dimensions Length Width is a mini-ever full frame, total height is 1,610 mm (FF models: +35 mm compared to its predecessor) has been set higher, and have contributed to the expansion of interior volume. The vehicles platform chassis was renewed, and yet it was about 40 kg lighter than its predecessor's. The position of number plates, as well as three second-top predecessor's tailgate, rear bumper on the back has been changed from the previous generation.

An audio monitor with back, the first in the mini standard (except for C-type). Thus, Honda Smart Parking Assist System, from the simple type of voice guidance, now assisted steering is performed in both forward and backward.

=== Chronology ===
2008 November 6
Performed a full model change to the fifth generation, went on sale from November 07.
2009 June 4
"PASTEL", "PASTEL turbo" special edition models equipped with headlamps, etc. based on the "HID Special" announced, sold from June 11. Also, "G type" and "PASTEL" was expanded to accommodate another grade of exclusive colour.
2009 October 15
Made some improvements. Improved fuel efficiency in cars and 4WD car turbo engine of FF NA engines, each "15% FY 2010 fuel economy standards," "fiscal 2010 fuel economy standards" has been achieved. The new FF NA engines in cars, "Taxation promote environmentally friendly vehicles," vehicles were covered. Done to improve the electric power steering, improved steering performance. In addition, "PASTEL" is a half-shade in the front window, "DIVA" in a half-shade front window, tailgate spoiler, which added with a micro-antenna. In addition, a new grade feature rich, "G type" is fully automatic air conditioning, high-allergy-free deodorant filter, driver seat height adjuster, tilt steering and equipped with "Comfort Select" a, "DIVA / DIVA turbo" The 14-inch alloy wheels ("DIVA" only, "DIVA turbo" is standard), discharge headlights, leather-wrapped steering wheel features a synthetic, non-audio was fitted with a back monitor "Cool Select" added the . In addition, in December 2006 a "G" and "pastel" colours are added to the body.
2010 May 17
"C type" based on, ABS + Brake Assist with EBD, with feature privacy glass / UV cut heat-ray absorption (rear tailgate rear quarter), coloured door mirrors (manual) and outer door handles, and full wheel caps special edition models equipped with "Comfort Special" and "DIVA" is based on the audio monitor with back, Honda Smart Key System immobilizer, security alarms, non-special edition models were equipped with front window shade half "Special" was released.
2010 November 18
Minor changes made. Lift-up Seat passenger cars went on sale from December 09. "G type" is a revamped front grille, projector type headlights were changed. Interior has adopted a steady meter and 3 eyes wide centre panel with decorative silver, front centre armrest is standard with a rear wiper and washer. In addition, "Honda Smart Parking Assist System," with improved usability review of the speed setting also. "DIVA" also "G type" as well as improvements are made, dedicated to the design front grille chrome paint, projector headlights were changed to type. Headlamp headlamps (low beam, with automatic leveling mechanism), wide centre panel Piano Black will be adjusted and, 3 eye meter is steady blue illumination adds, which occurred during differentiation. In addition, special sport seats with built-in door mirrors and turn signals. Together, the previous year had been fitted with type "Life" logo emblem is gone, "DIVA" has moved from right to left logo emblem. "DIVA" to wear the emblem of the logo is only since the late fourth type. In addition, the former is additionally equipped with audio remote control switch and a rear camera and lighting can be installed at the dealer affordable navigation option "Special Package for mounting navigation" was also set. Furthermore, due to this minor "PASTEL" is discontinued, the turbo cars "DIVA · Turbo Smart Style" was only offered.
2011 August 22
"G", based on grade advanced "Smart Plus" discharge headlights with projector type of equipment (low beam, with automatic levelling mechanism), coloured front grille, special edition models equipped with a front window, half-shade "HID smart Special "release.
2011 November 28
"DIVA" is based on a 14-inch alloy wheels, fully automatic air conditioning, as well as equipped with a full specification Honda Smart Key System, subjected to the shift knob chrome inner door handles and knobs button air-conditioning outlets Vehicles specially designed "Smart Special" was released (launched December 22).

== Chinese-market Life (GR; 2020) ==
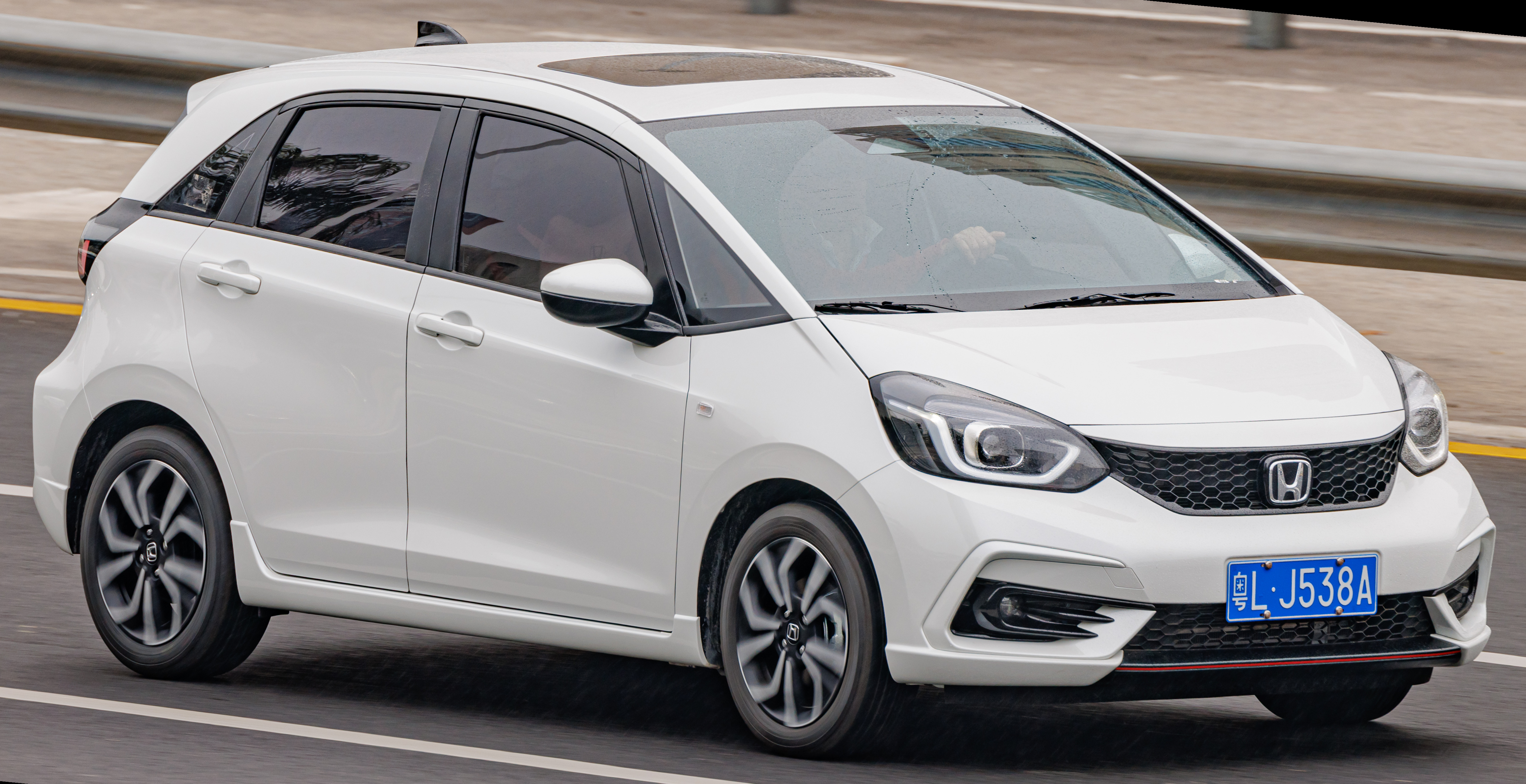
Honda Life (GR)

The "Life" nameplate is also used by Dongfeng Honda for the renamed fourth-generation Fit (sold by Guangqi Honda) for the Chinese market. Introduced in 2020, the minor differences between the Fit and the Life are the front bumper designs and rear taillight tint colour (the Life has a clear smoked tint).
