= Honda N-Van =

Microvan classed as a kei car produced by Honda

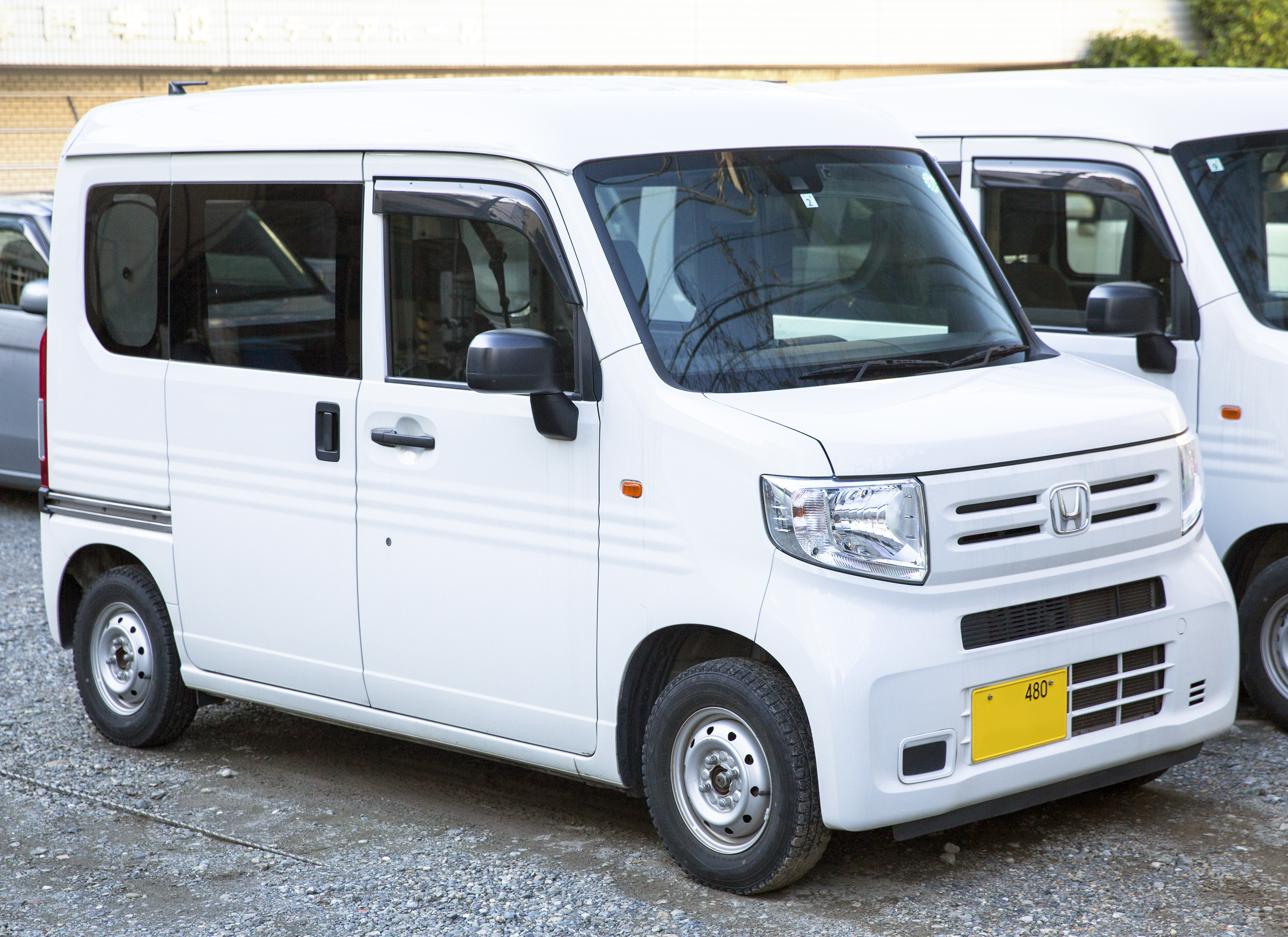
- 2019 Honda N-Van G Honda Sensing (Japan)

Overview
- Manufacturer: Honda
- Model code: JJ1/2
- Production: 2018–present
- Assembly: Japan: Suzuka, Mie (Suzuka plant)

Body and chassis
- Class: Microvan; Kei car
- Body style: 5-door van
- Layout: Front-engine, front-wheel-drive; Front-engine, four-wheel-drive; Front-motor, front-wheel-drive (EV)
- Related: Honda N-Box; Honda N-WGN

Powertrain
- Engine: Petrol: 658 cc S07B I3; 658 cc S07B turbo I3
- Electric motor: Permanent magnet on front axle
- Power output: 39 kW (53 PS) (S07B); 47 kW (64 PS) (S07B turbo, N-Van e:)
- Transmission: 6-speed manual (All trims except +STYLE FUN Turbo); CVT

Dimensions
- Wheelbase: 2,520 mm (99.2 in)
- Length: 3,395 mm (133.7 in)
- Width: 1,475 mm (58.1 in)
- Height: 1,950 mm (76.8 in)
- Curb weight: 940 kg (2,072.3 lb) (FF/6MT); 970 kg (2,138.5 lb) (FF/CVT); 1,000 kg (2,204.6 lb) (4WD/6MT); 1,020 kg (2,248.7 lb) (4WD/CVT)

Chronology
- Predecessor: Honda Acty van; Honda Vamos & Vamos Hobio

The Honda N-Van (stylized as "Honda N-VAN") is a microvan produced by Honda for the Japanese market since 2018. Initially only available with a petrol-powered internal combustion engine, a battery electric variant was introduced in 2024. The origin for the vehicle's name expresses "next generation light van" proposed by N series as see in the N-One, N-Box, and N-WGN: it is part of a renewed line-up of Kei class city cars. The "N" prefix was previously used for the late 1960s and 1970s N360; originally it stood for norimono which loosely translates to vehicle. For the new N lineup, the "N" represented New, Next, Nippon, and Norimono.

== Overview ==
It was developed with the aim of "a new appearance" of light commercial vehicles in the fifth series of "N series" deployed starting with the first N-BOX released in November 2011. In addition to being the first commercial vehicle in the series, it is also a substantial successor to Acty van, Vamos, & Vamos Hobio which were previously sold.

From the semi-cab overstyle Acty line, it adopts a tall wagon style based on the FF car platform developed at the second generation N-BOX. As a result, the length of the luggage compartment has been greatly reduced by comparison with Acty which had adopted the mid-ship engine layout (the luggage compartment length is 1,510 mm (59 in) on the left side and 1,330 mm (52 in) on the right side, shortening by 215–395 mm (8.5–15.6 in) respectively).

On the other hand, for the first time as a microvan, we adopted a "door-in-pillar structure" that eliminated the centre pillar on the side of the passenger's side to improve usability in loading and unloading operations of long objects, etc. In addition, similar to the N-Box centre tank layout by adopting a low floor by adoption, the cargo compartment height was expanded to 1,365 mm (53.7 in) which was 165 mm (6.5 in) higher than Acty van. In addition to the rear seat, a dive down mechanism is also adopted for passenger's seat, realizing a luggage room connected from the front passenger's seat to the rear seat/tailgate. It is also possible to load long objects. The minimum ground clearance is approximately 15 to 15.5 cm (5.9 to 6.1 in).

== Variants ==
There were initially four trim variations available for the Honda N-Van, the L, G, +Style Cool and +Style Fun. The +Style Cool model omits the raised roof, for a 1,850 mm (73 in) height instead of the 1,950 mm (77 in) height on the other models. The +Style Cool was discontinued in February 2021. All models are available with a choice of FWD or AWD drivetrain and a choice of CVT transmission or a 6-speed manual transmission.

The engine variants come from Honda's S-series and are available in naturally-aspirated and turbocharged versions. In the naturally-aspirated version it makes 39 kW (53 PS) and 64 Nm of torque, and is offered on all models. The DOHC turbocharged engine is only available on the +Style Cool Turbo and +Style Fun Turbo trims; it makes peak 47 kW (64 PS) and 104 Nm. The engine is an improved version based on the S660.

All trims come with a full digital auto air conditioner as standard equipment.

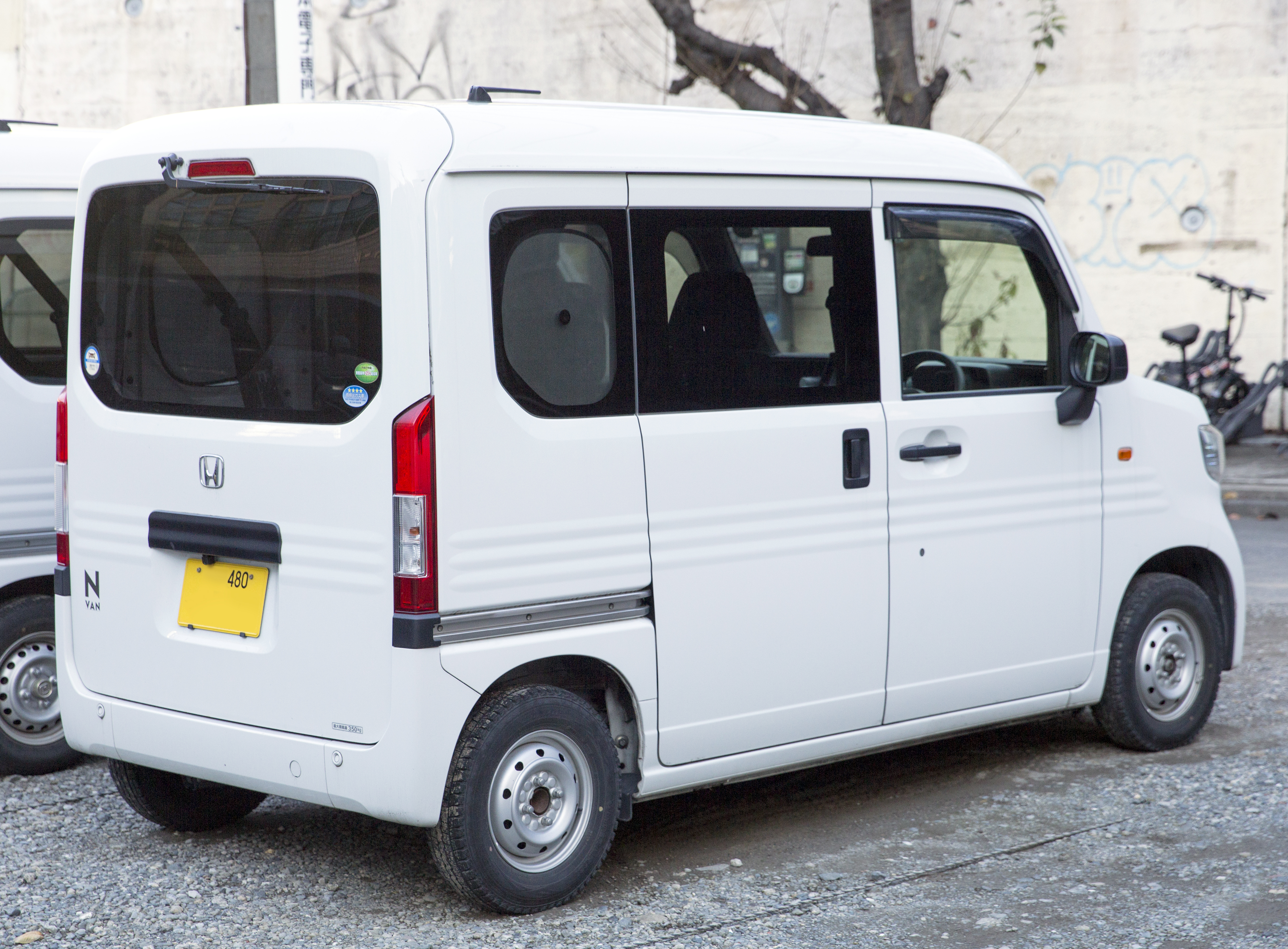
N-Van G rear view

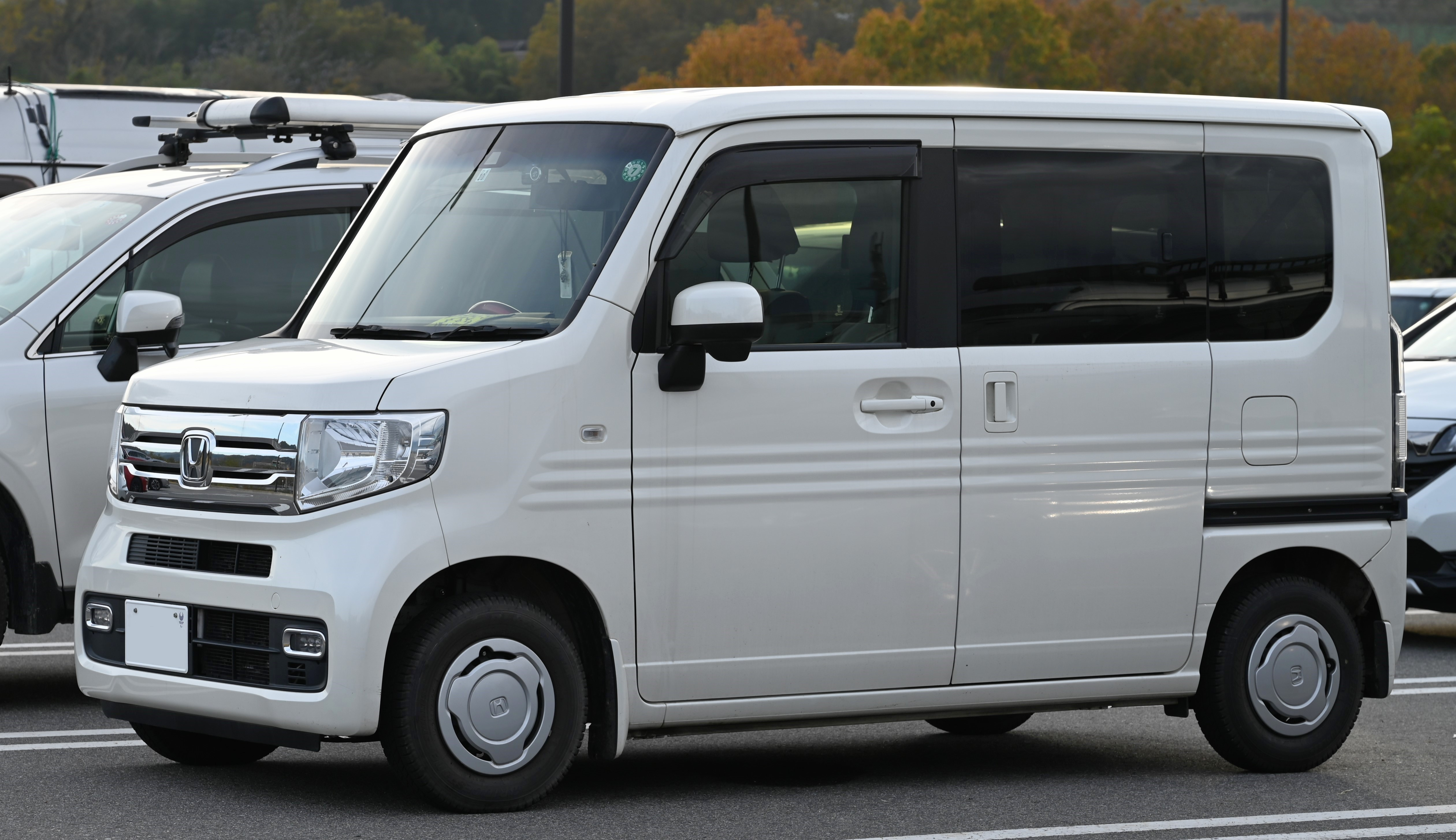
N-Van +Style Cool

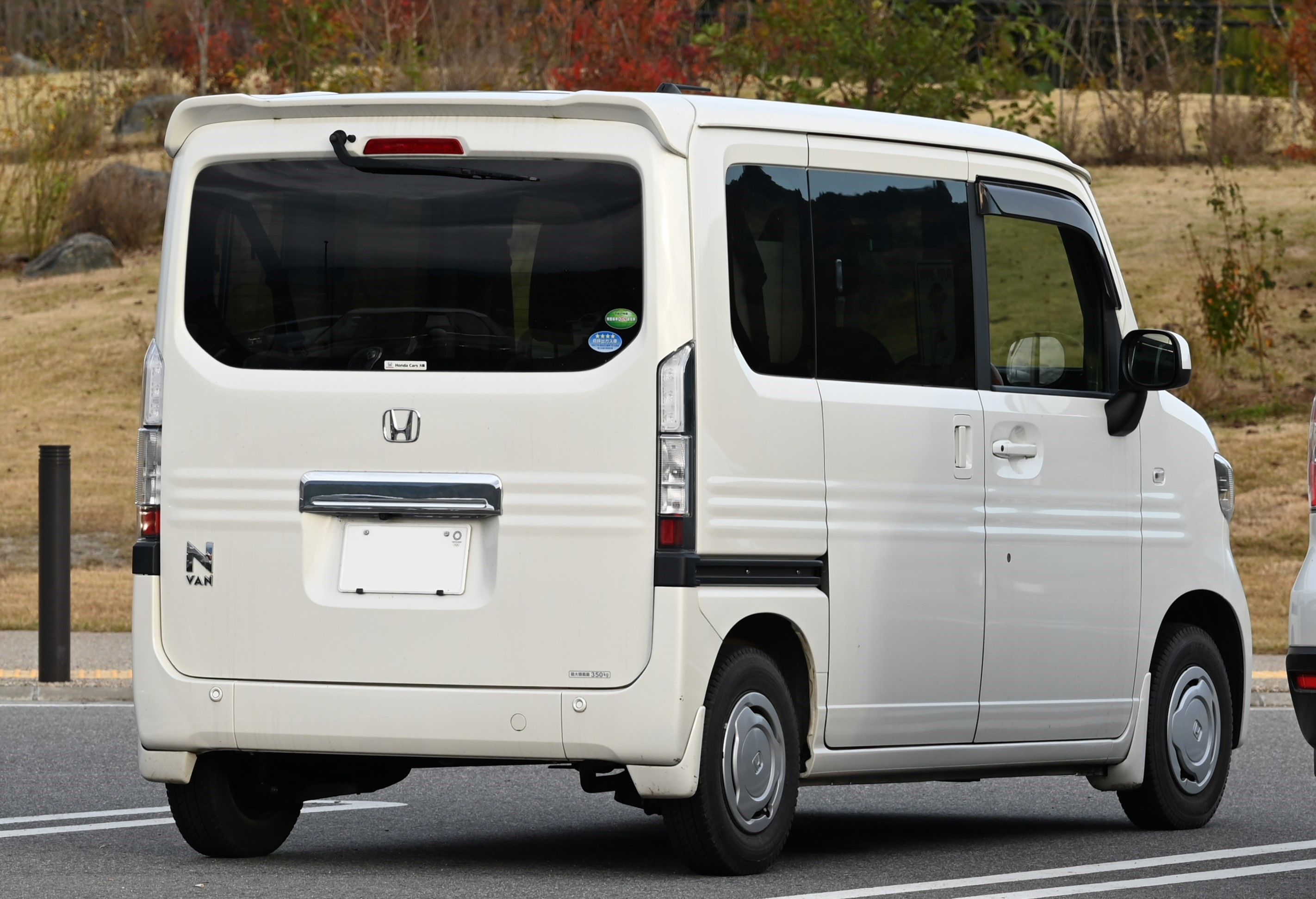
N-Van +Style Cool rear view

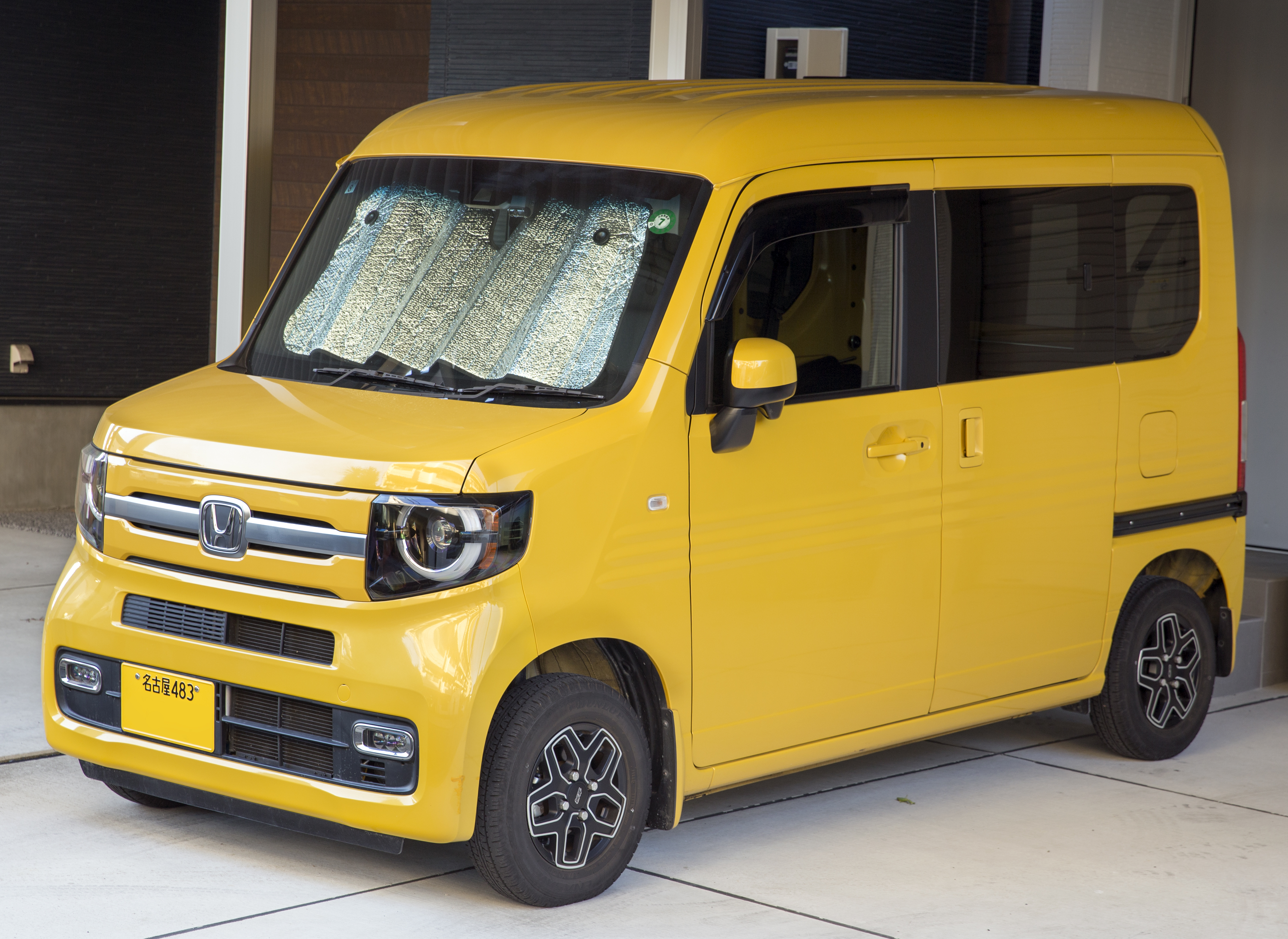
N-Van +Style Fun

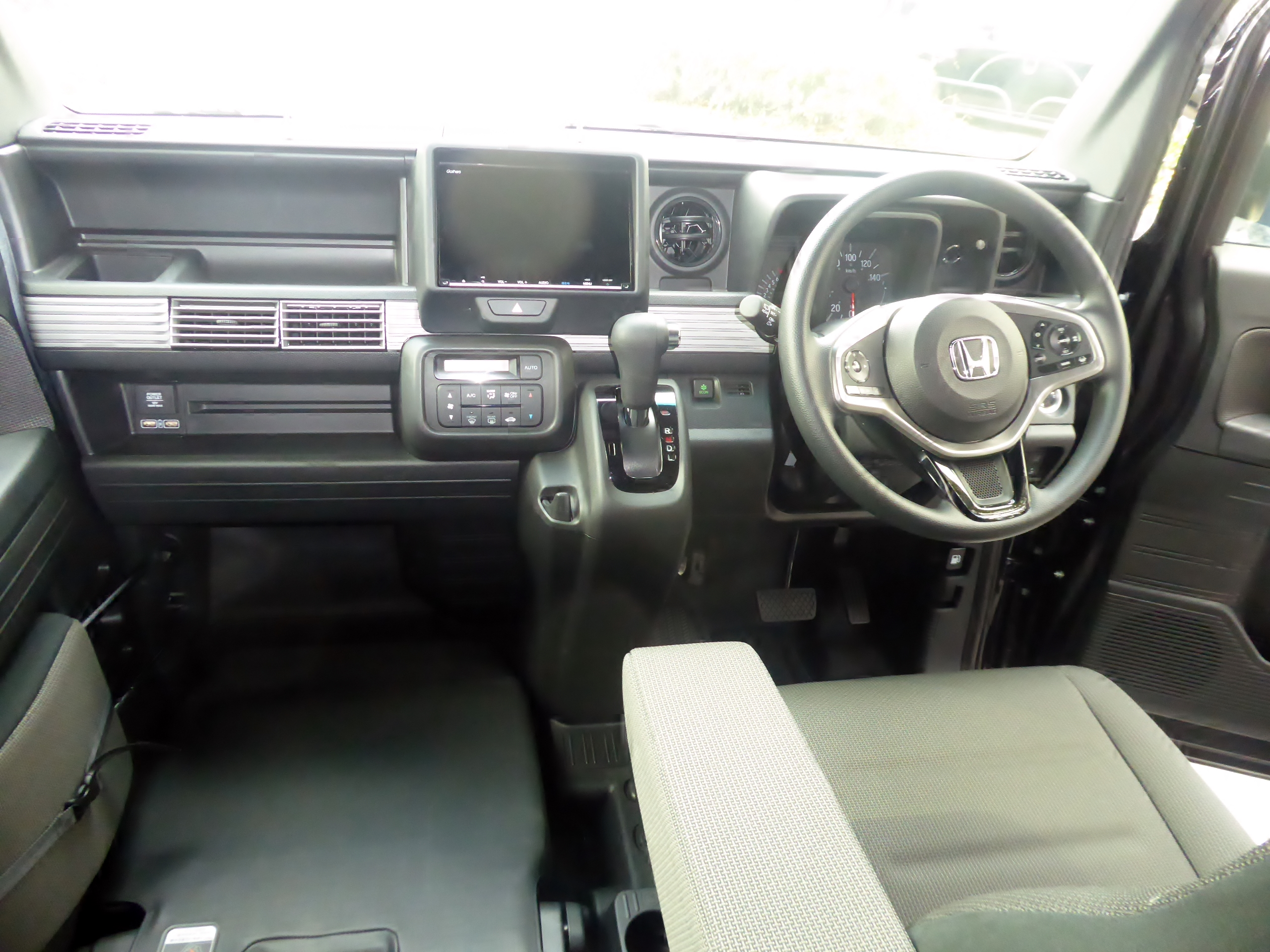
Interior

== N-Van e: (2024) ==
The battery electric variant of the N-Van, named "N-Van e:", went on sale in Japan in the second quarter of 2024. The N-Van e: is available in four different models: the e:L4 and the e:FUN (a leisure-oriented variant with round LED headlights) target private buyers and are available for direct purchase, while the business-only single-seater e:G and the e:L2 (two seats in tandem) are only available for leasing. The business models have a less powerful engine than the e:L4 and e:FUN, producing 39 kW (53 PS) rather than 47 kW (64 PS).

The weights range between 1,060 and 1,140 kg (2,337 and 2,513 lb). The additional weight and lower centre of gravity – since the batteries are mounted beneath the floor – coupled with larger, 13-inch wheels, give the car more sure-footed driving characteristics than the internal combustion engine (ICE) variants. The more powerful engine also has fifty percent more torque than the turbo version, which counteracts the added weight and generally makes the car better suited to highway use.

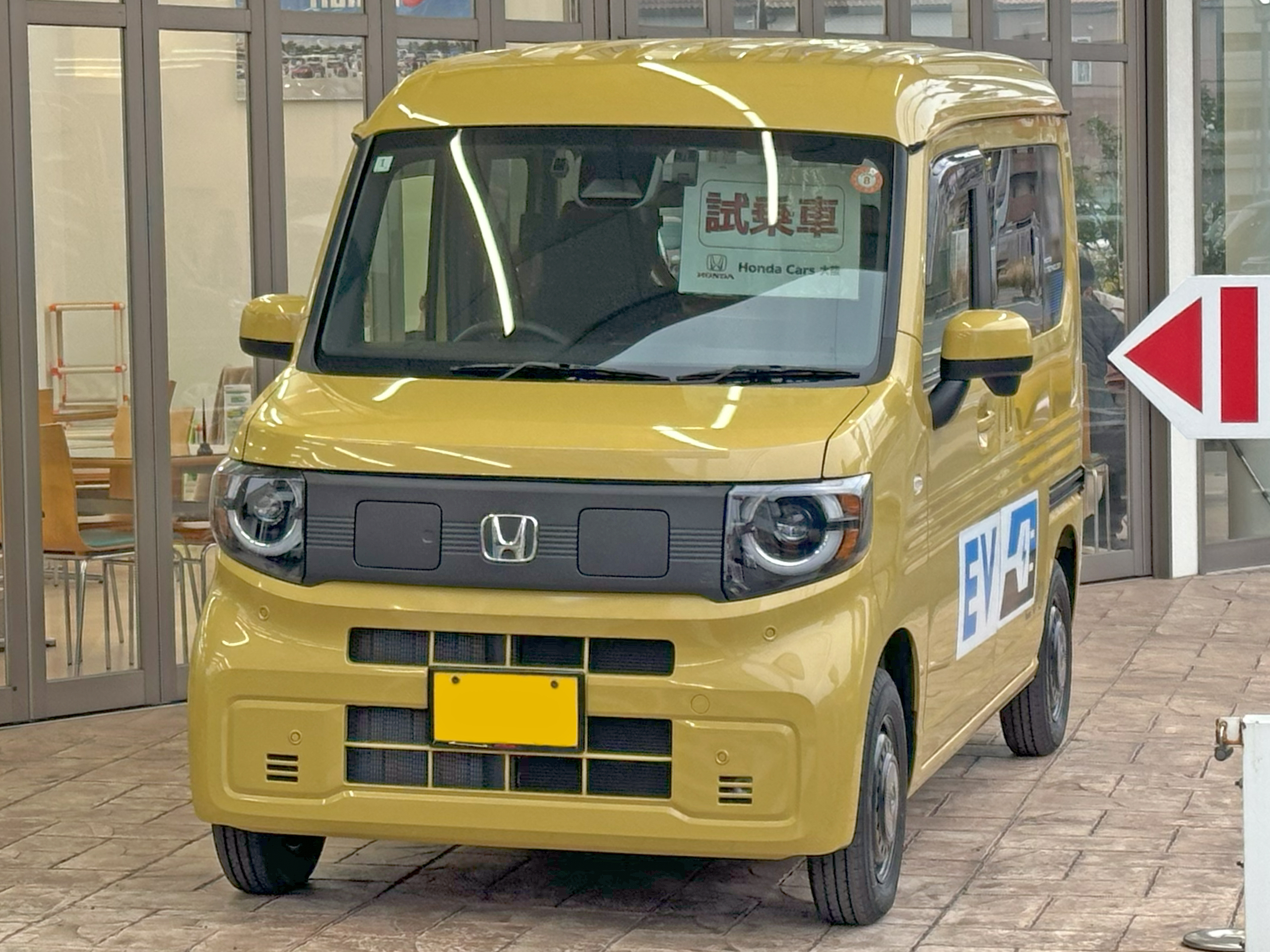
N-Van e:FUN

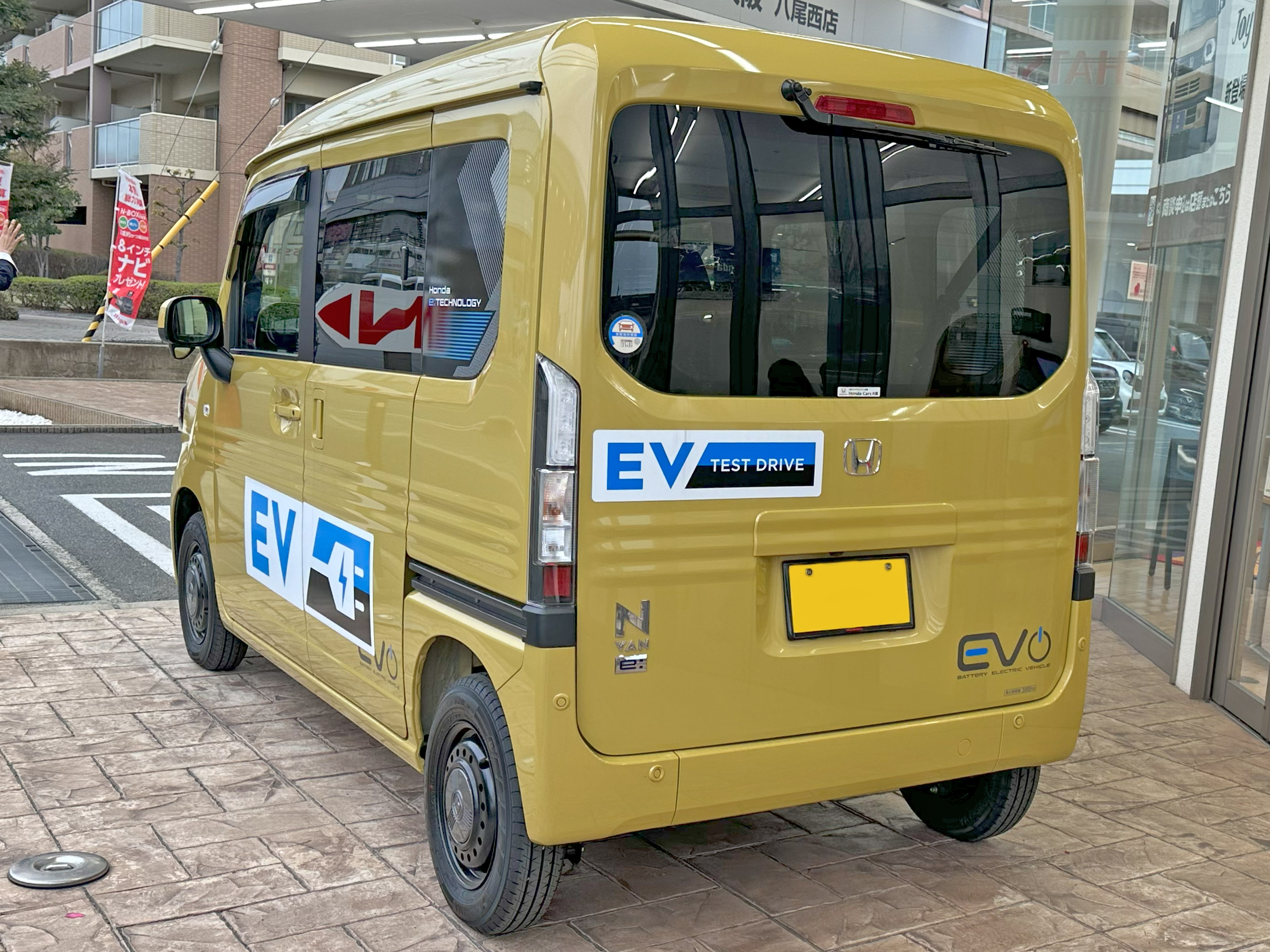
N-Van e:FUN rear view

== Fuel economy ==
For the +STYLE FUN Turbo model, the Fuel consumption rate based on the Japan Ministry of Land, Infrastructure, Transport and Tourism's examination value in WLTC mode is 18.8km/L and 23.6km/L on the JC08 mode. For fuel economy, there is an idle stop function that stops the engine when the vehicle is stopped such as waiting at a traffic light to reduce fuel consumption and emissions. There is an ECON switch to turn on the ECON mode, where the entire vehicle is automatically controlled in a low fuel consumption mode, not only the engine but also the air conditioner. This prioritises fuel efficiency.

== Luggage and storage ==
The engine is in the front of the car, and the fuel tank is under the front seat. The height difference from the ground to the luggage/storage floorboard is 525 mm (21 in), making it easier to load items into the van. By adopting the same FF platform as the N-BOX, the N-VAN shortens the length of the engine compartment and makes it more compact, allowing more space for cargo and passengers. The maximum load capacity is 350 kg (772 lb).

The N-Van comes with a full range of user-focused equipment and storage, such as a stopper to prevent objects from falling under the driver's seat, trays and hooks on the instrument panel and inside the front door, and a USB jack that is convenient for charging smartphones and tablets.

Long or large and heavy items can easily be loaded and unloaded smoothly from the passenger side, and speedy work is possible with access from multiple openings. Loading and unloading from the sidewalk is safe when the tailgate cannot be opened or in areas with heavy traffic, as the passenger side has a door-in pillar structure, thus the b-pillar is pillar-less, and the first time seen in a light goods can.

You are able to freely arrange the space in the rear by attaching pipes and shelves as there are a total of 28 utility nuts on the left and right walls of the storage compartment and in the inside of the tailgate. Once the cap is removed, it can be used as an M6 size screw hole, to attach pipes, shelves and metal fittings.

There are eight tie down hooks to secure your cargo with belts and springs, with two hooks at the foot of the passenger seat and two at the back, with the remain four hooks on the luggage compartment floor for furniture, bicycles, and even motorbikes.

== Safety equipment and driving support ==
For safety performance, the driving support system "Honda SENSING" was standard equipment in the +STYLE COOL and +STYLE FUN trims. The collision mitigation brake (CMBS), the pedestrian accident reduction steering, the preceding vehicle departure notification function, the sign recognition function, the out-of-road departure suppression function are provided for all types, and only the "continuously variable transmission automatic" (CVT) Function, adaptive cruise control, lane keeping support system, backward erroneous departure suppression function are added. Also, auto high beams are added to all types of "N-VAN + STYLE". The minimum turning radius is approximately 4.6 to 4.7 meters (15 ft).

In terms of collision safety, the Honda N-Van is built with G-CON (G-Force Control Technology), which is a strong frame even though the passenger side does not have a conventional B-pillar. Honda's original safety technology "G-CON" controls the impact (G) at the time of collision. Honda contributes to collision safety performance by placing lightweight and high-strength materials in various places. A door-in-pillar structure with a built-in centre pillar function is used for the front passenger door and sliding door. When the door is closed, it ensures collision safety performance equivalent to that of the pillar structure.

== Colours ==
The L. and G. trims are only offered in Taffeta White and Luna Silver Metallic. The +STYLE Fun trim is offered in six Colours, Frame Red, French Blue Pearl, Admiral Gray Metallic, Nighthawk Black Pearl, Sonic Gray Pearl and Platinum White Pearl. There are three discontinued Colours, Premium Yellow Pearl, Surf Blue and Pink. The Platinum White Pearl and Premium Yellow Pearl are both premium Colours that cost an additional 33,000 yen.

== Standard equipment for the +STYLE FUN Turbo ==
Of all the variants, the +STYLE FUN Turbo is the highest trim available. For driving support functions, it is equipped with a round full LED headlight (projector type with manual leveling and auto light control mechanism). The LED fog lamp also comes with a chrome trim. For safety equipment, i-SRS airbag system is offered for both the driver and front passenger. Other safety equipment includes Honda SENSING, VSA (ABS + TCS + sideslip control), and Hill start assist function.

As for the equipment for driving comfort, the +STYLE FUN Turbo's interior is fully black instead of having grey interior trims seen on many kei commercial vehicles. It is also equipped with a high-performance dust collection filter compatible with PM2.5, special package for driving navigation (dealer's option), front two speakers, and USB jacks for charging (with 2 quick charging compatible types). Two accessory sockets (DC12V) are fitted, of which one is located at the passenger seat, and the other is at the left rear panel in the cargo area. The rear seats also comes with headrests, not available in the L and G trims. The door mirrors are retractable, and the front two windows have heat shield IR/UV cut, while the front windscreen has Super UV protection as standard. For the sliding door, rear quarter and tailgate, privacy glass is standard equipment.

== Sales ==
Year	Japan
2018	24,439
2019	45,230
2020	32,186
2021	26,147
2022	32,606
2023	29,676
2024	30,667

== See also ==
- Honda N-One
- Honda N-Box
- Honda N-WGN
- Honda S660
