= Honda N-Box =

Kei car produced by Honda

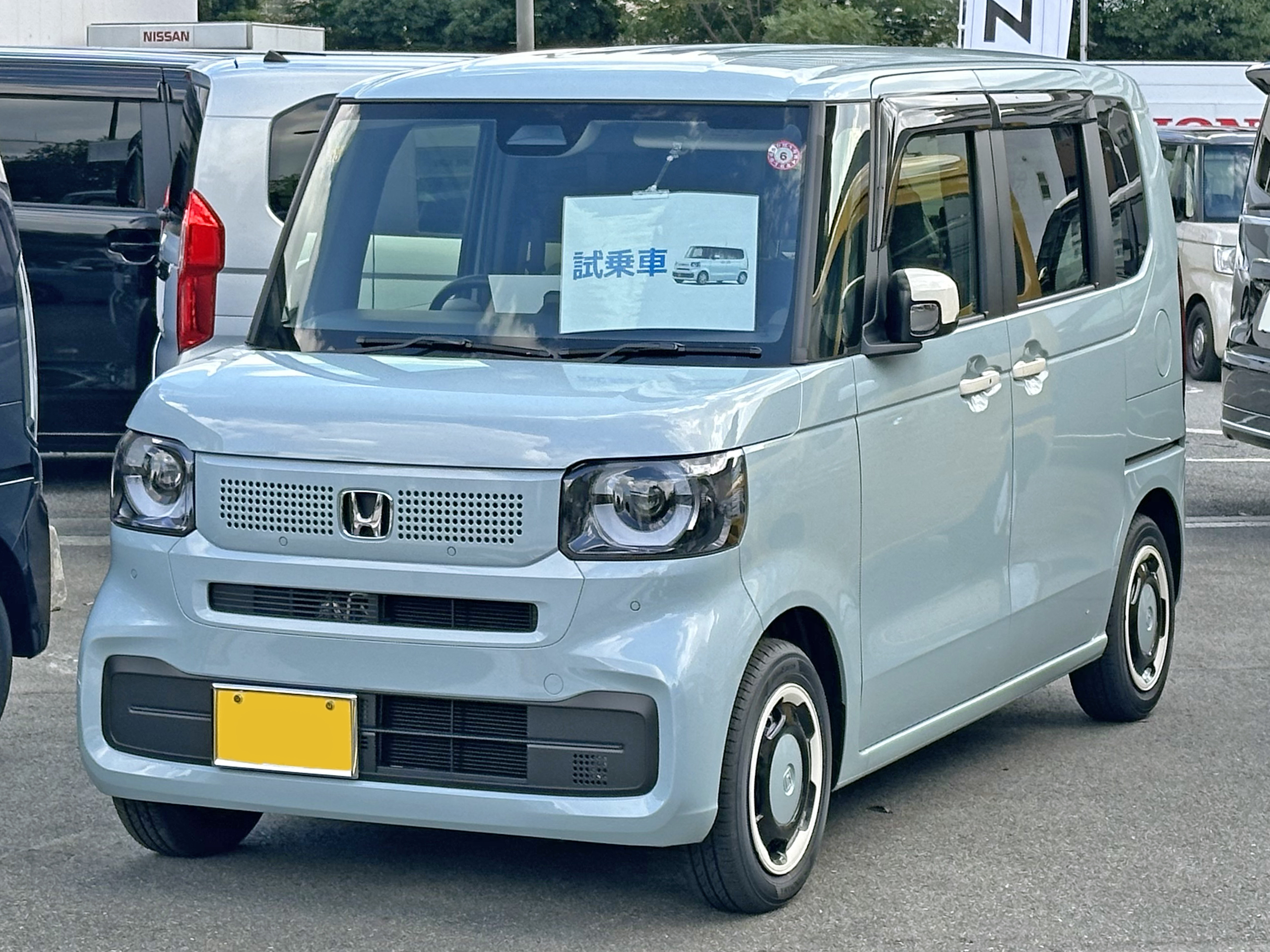

Overview
- Manufacturer: Honda
- Production: December 2011 – present
- Assembly: Japan: Suzuka, Mie (Suzuka plant)

Body and chassis
- Class: Kei car
- Layout: Front-engine, front-wheel-drive; Front-engine, four-wheel-drive
- Related: Honda N-Van; Honda N-One; Honda N-WGN; Honda S660

Chronology
- Predecessor: Honda Life; Honda Vamos/Vamos Hobio

The Honda N-Box (Japanese: ホンダ・N-BOX, Honda Enubokkusu) (stylized in all caps as N-BOX) is a kei car produced by Honda since 2011 over three generations. A Japanese domestic market vehicle, the N-Box is a five-door minivan with a front-mounted engine and either front-wheel drive or four-wheel drive. Together with the N-WGN, N-One and N-Van, it is part of the renewed N lineup of kei class city cars from Honda. The "N" prefix was previously used for the late 1960s and 1970s N360; originally it stood for norimono which loosely translates to vehicle. For the new N lineup, the "N" represented New, Next, Nippon, and Norimono.

As of December 2019, the N-Box has been the best-selling car in Japan for 28 consecutive months. As of 2019, 1.7 million units had been sold since its introduction.

== First generation (JF1/2; 2011) ==
First generation
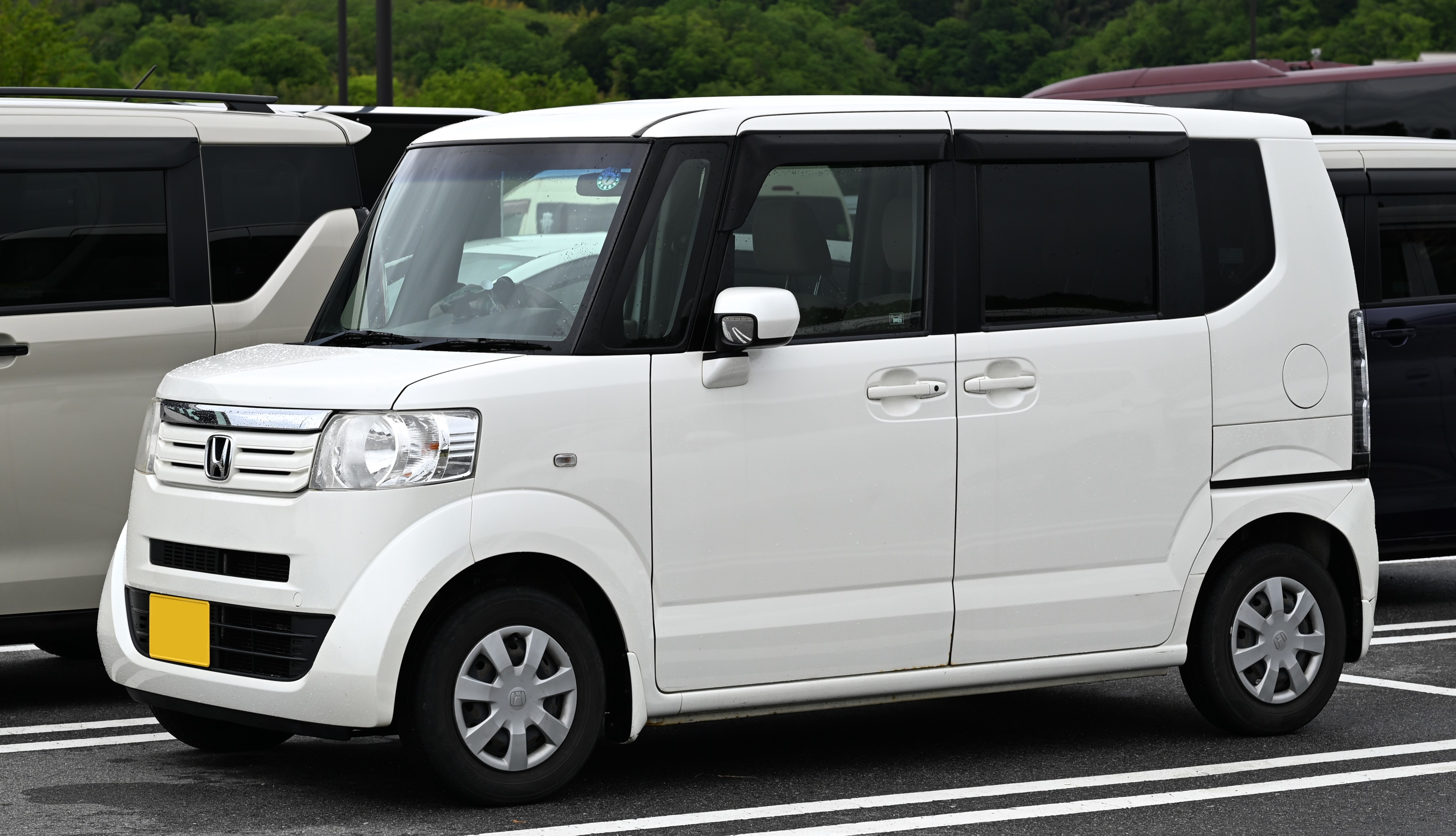

Overview
- Model code: JF1/2
- Production: December 2011 – August 2017 (N-Box); July 2012 – August 2017 (N-Box+)
- Designer: Katsuhito Nakamura and Kazufumi Oyamada

Body and chassis
- Body style: 5-door minivan

Powertrain
- Engine: 658 cc S07A I3; 658 cc S07A turbo I3
- Power output: N/A: 43 kW (58 PS); Turbo: 47 kW (64 PS)
- Transmission: CVT

Dimensions
- Wheelbase: 2,520 mm (99.2 in)
- Length: 3,395 mm (133.7 in)
- Width: 1,475 mm (58.1 in)
- Height: 1,780 mm (70.1 in) (N-Box); 1,800 mm (70.9 in) (N-Box+)
- Kerb weight: 930–1,060 kg (2,050–2,337 lb)

The first-generation N-Box was unveiled on 27 October 2011 and launched in Japan on 30 November 2011. The N-Box+ variants include: 2 tone styles, and Custom. This model, based on the N Concept 3, has a slanted loading floor at the rear and can be fitted with a fold-out ramp - enabling heavy objects to be rolled up and into the cargo area. The seating arrangement was also made more flexible, allowing a variety of different configurations.

A model for wheelchair access, released in August 2012. Four-wheel drive is standard for wheelchair access models.

The highest trim, the Modulo X was released in December 2012. Featuring a redesigned grille and front fascia, and suspension lowered by 15 mm. It was only offered in Front-wheel drive drivetain.

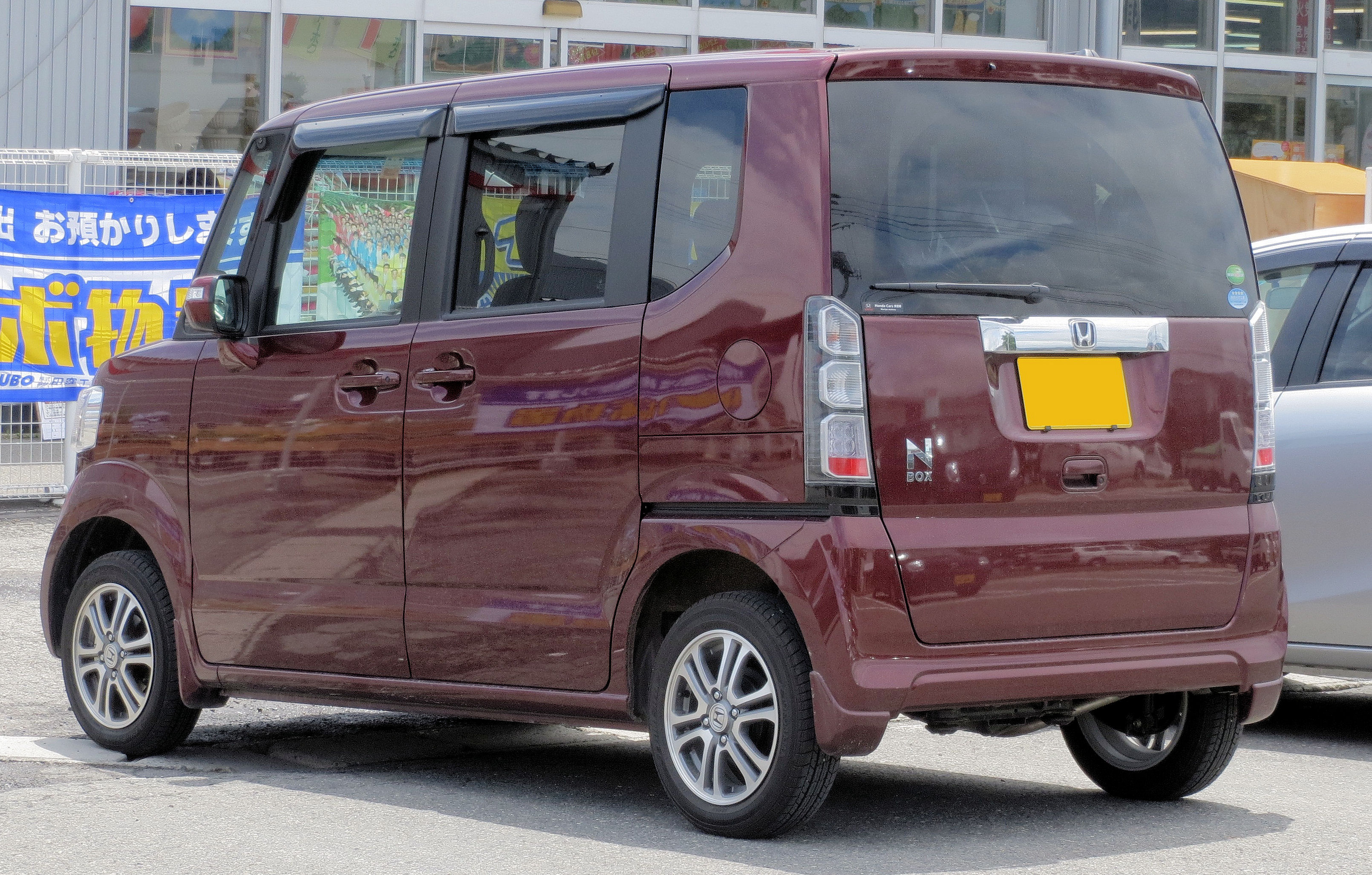
Rear view

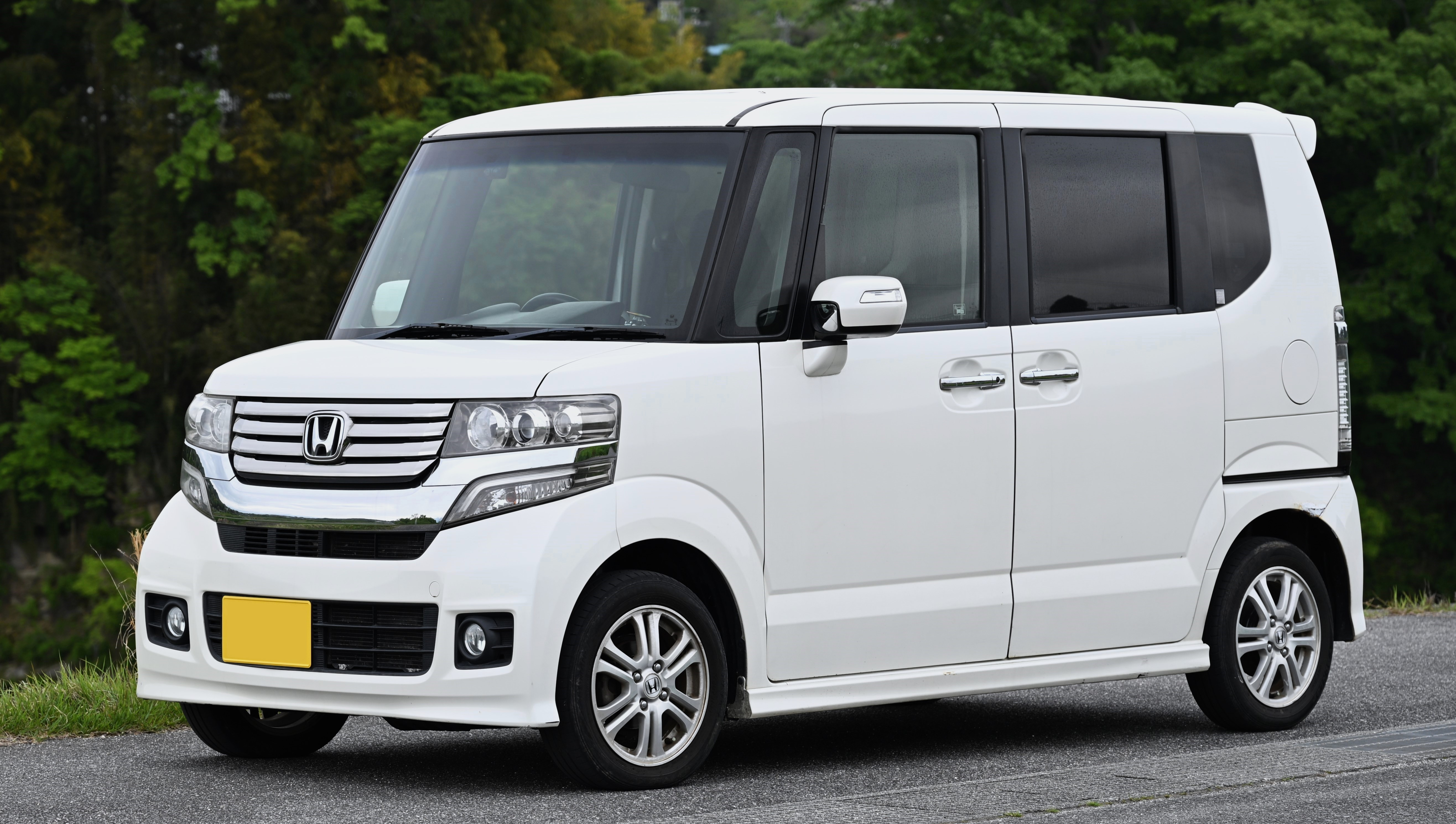
N-Box Custom

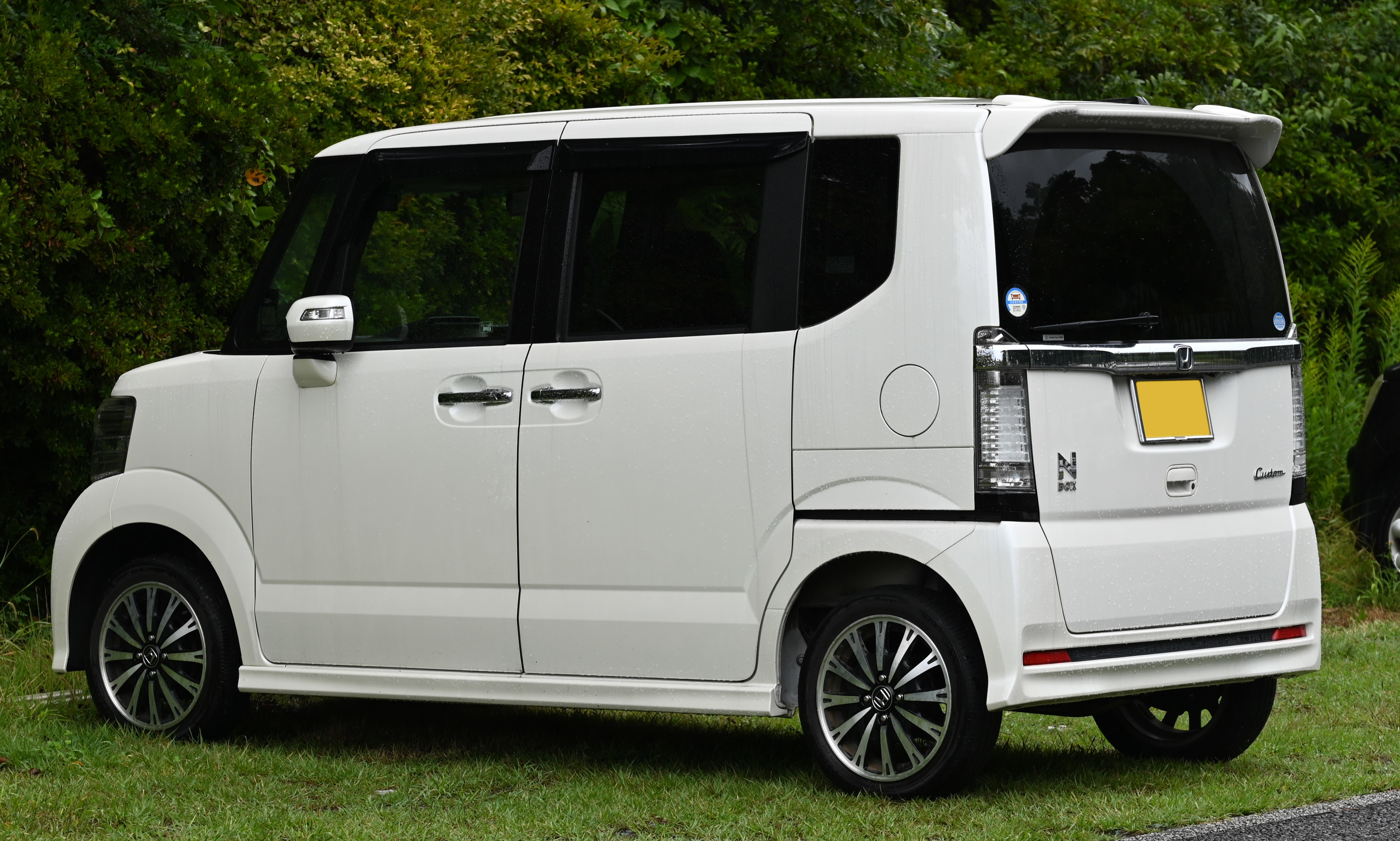
N-Box Custom rear view

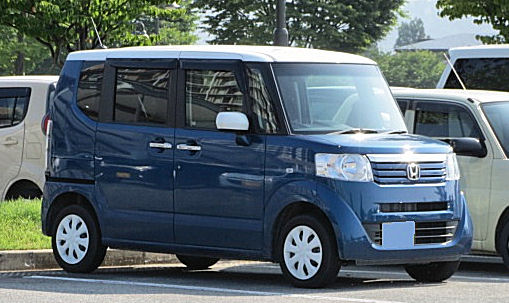
N-Box+

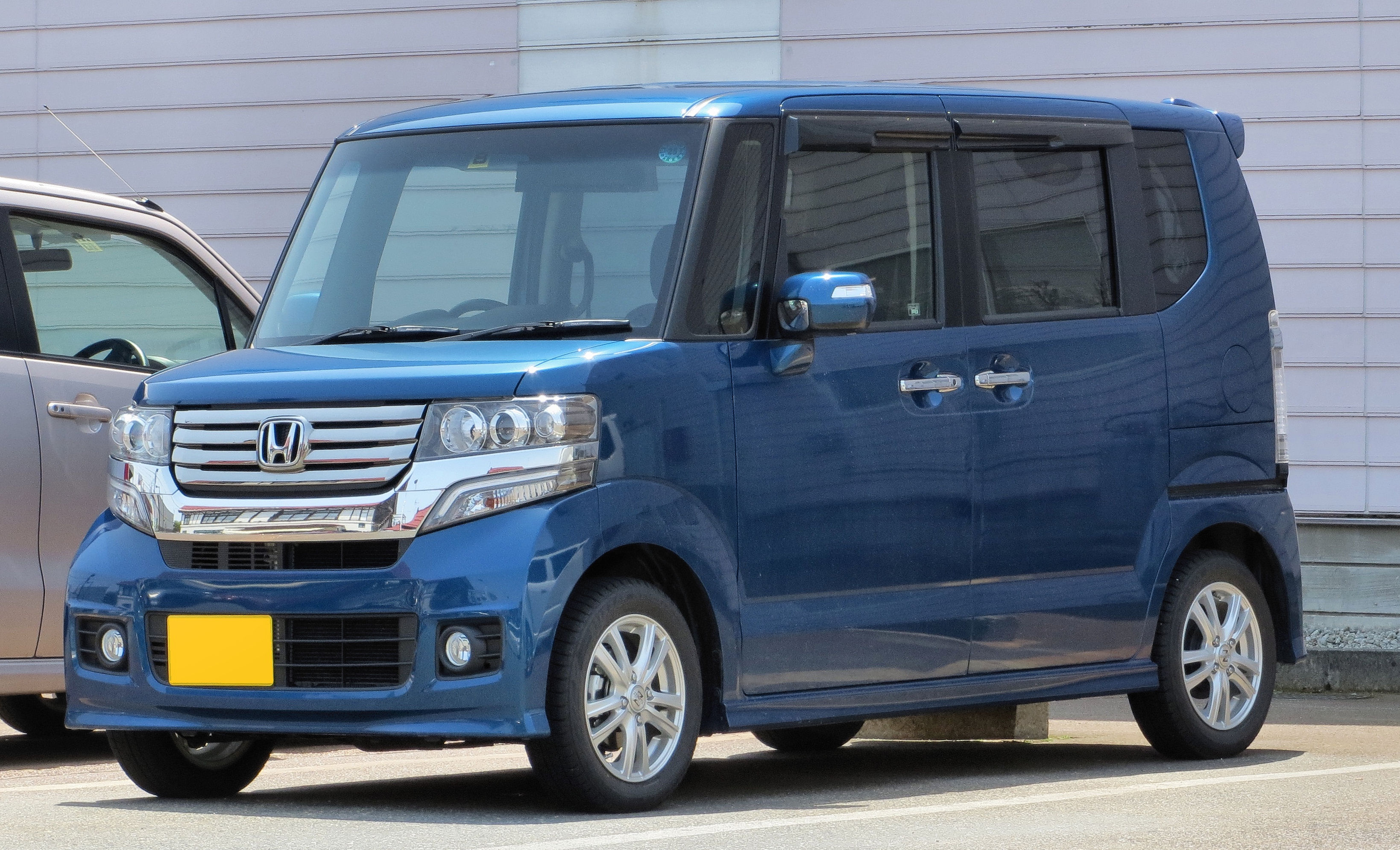
N-Box+ Custom

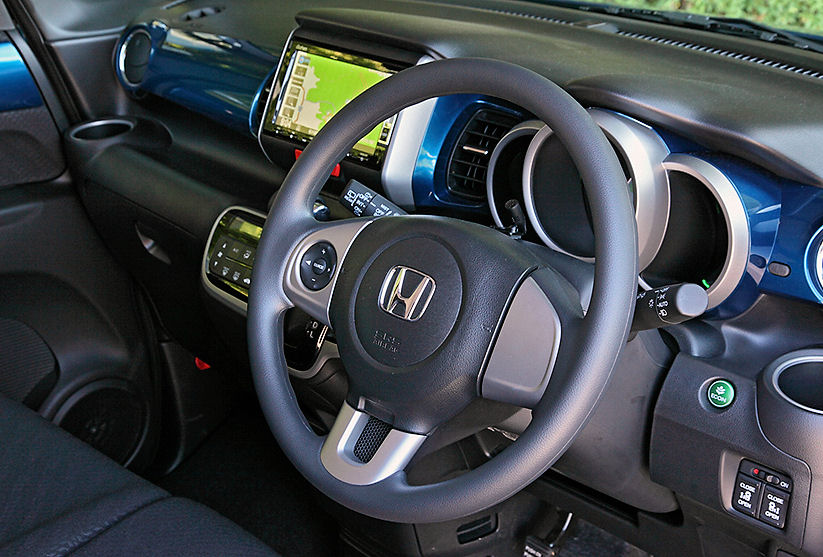
N-Box+ interior

=== N-Box Slash (JF1/2; 2014) ===
N-Box Slash
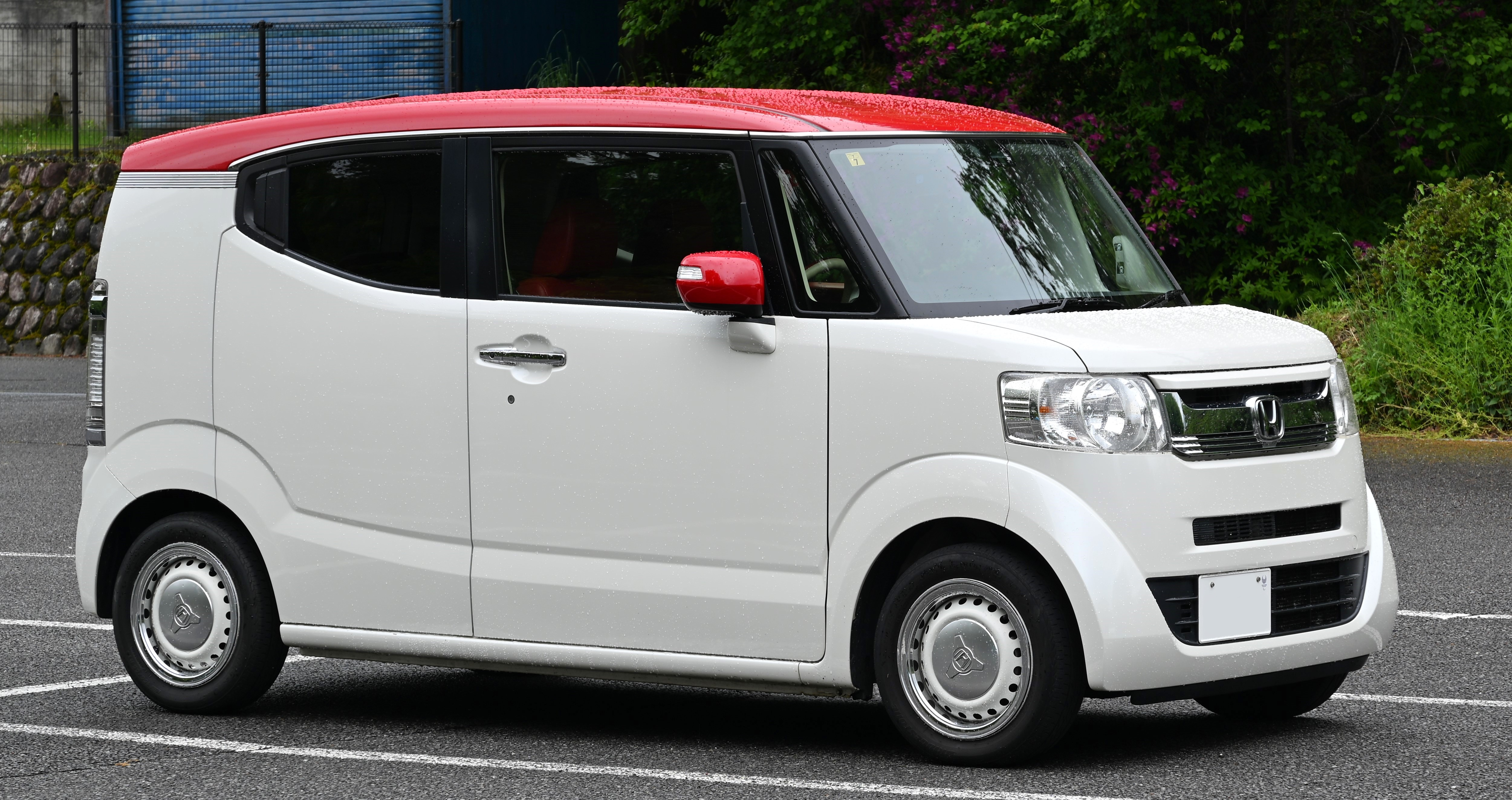

Overview
- Model code: JF1/2
- Production: December 2014 – February 2020

Body and chassis
- Body style: 5-door hatchback

Powertrain
- Engine: 658 cc S07A I3; 658 cc S07A turbo I3
- Power output: N/A: 43 kW (58 PS); Turbo: 47 kW (64 PS)
- Transmission: CVT

Dimensions
- Wheelbase: 2,520 mm (99.2 in)
- Length: 3,395 mm (133.7 in)
- Width: 1,475 mm (58.1 in)
- Height: 1,670 mm (65.7 in) (FWD); 1,685 mm (66.3 in) (4WD)
- Kerb weight: 920–1,000 kg (2,028–2,205 lb)

The N-Box Slash was a lower roof version of the N-Box released in December 2014. Unlike the regular N-Box, the Slash model had hinged rear doors. It was offered in 2 variants: G, and X. It remained on sale for over two more years alongside the second generation N-Box, until the beginning of 2020.

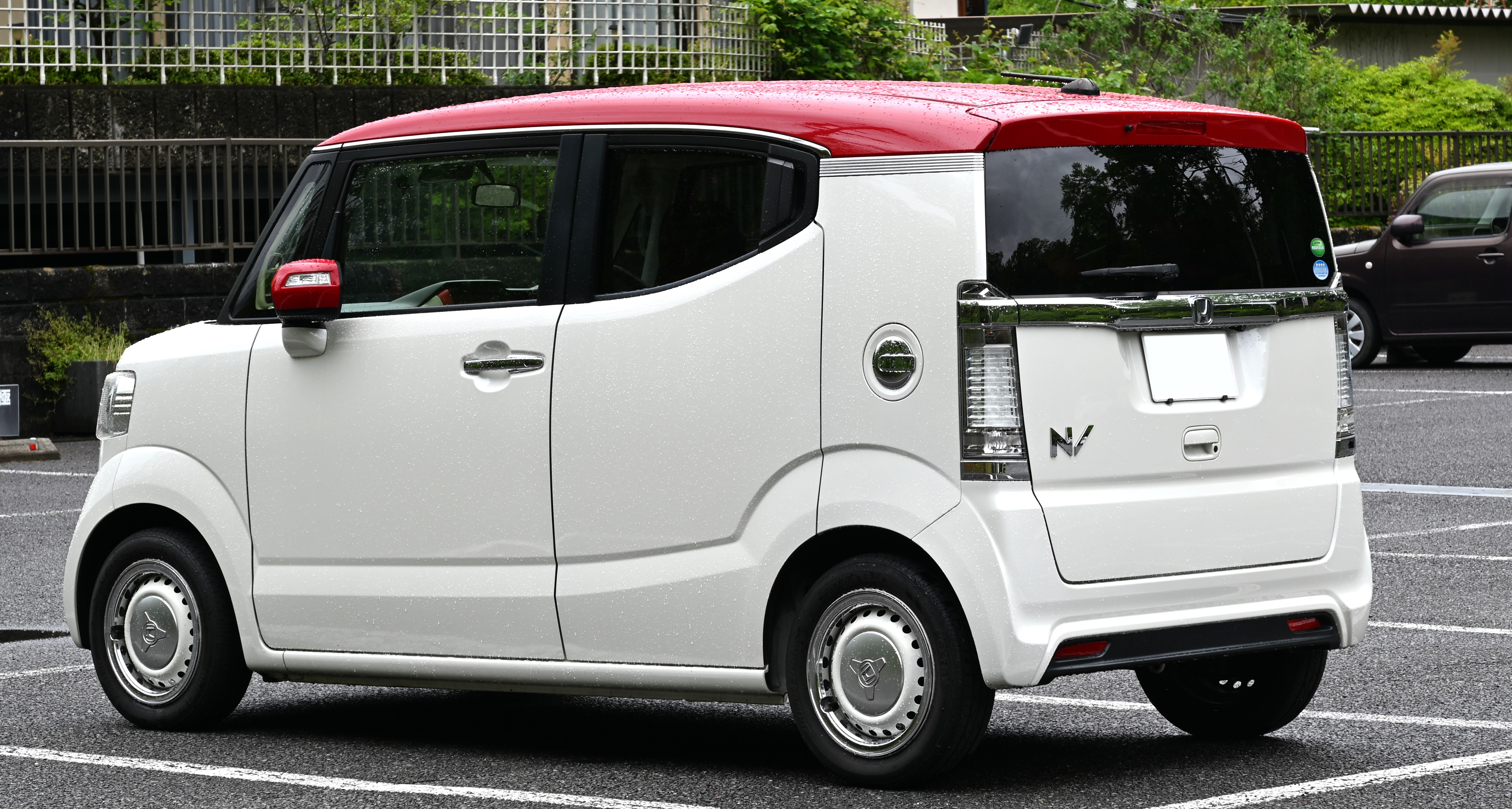
Rear view

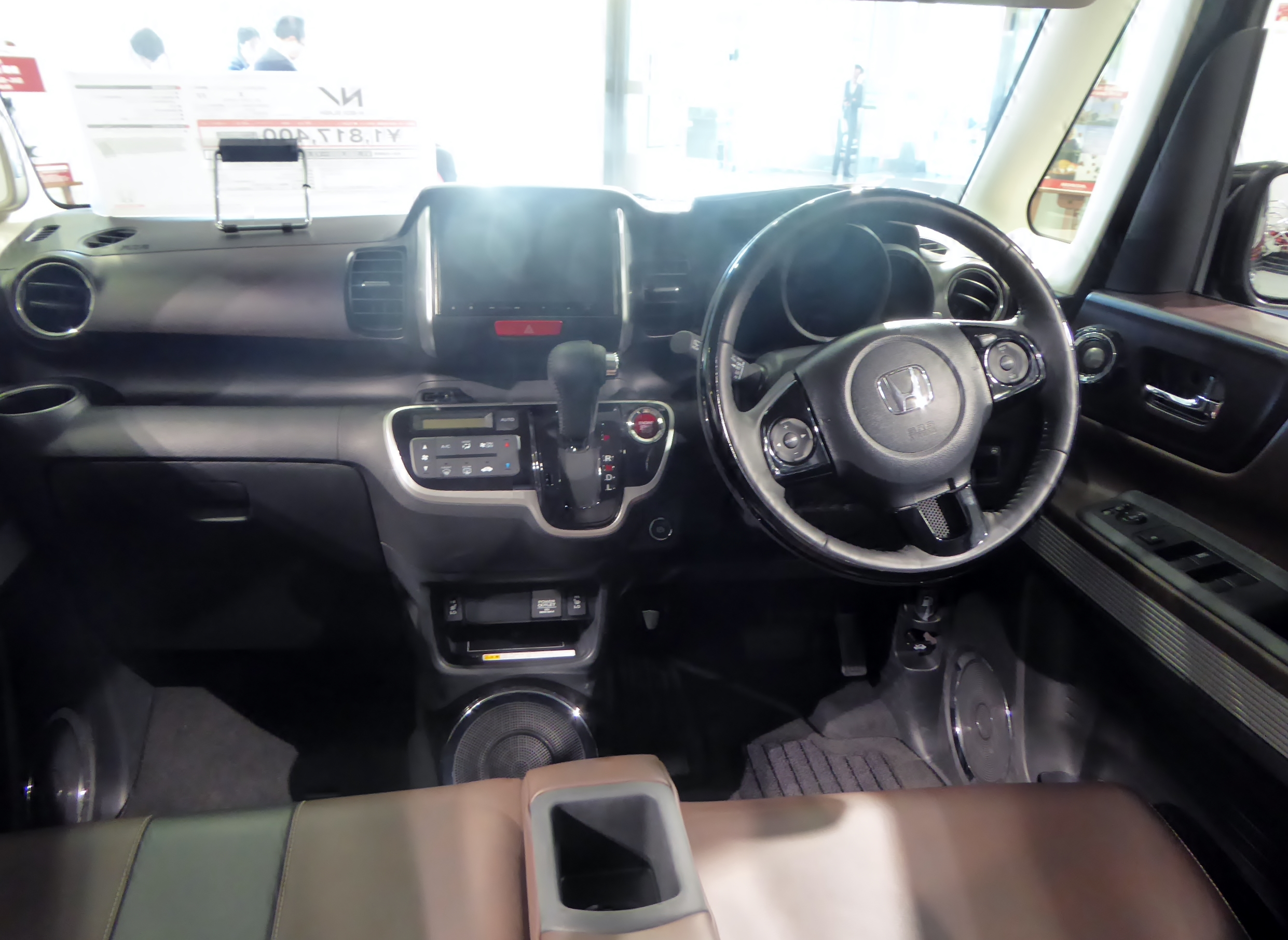
Interior

== Second generation (JF3/4; 2017) ==
Second generation
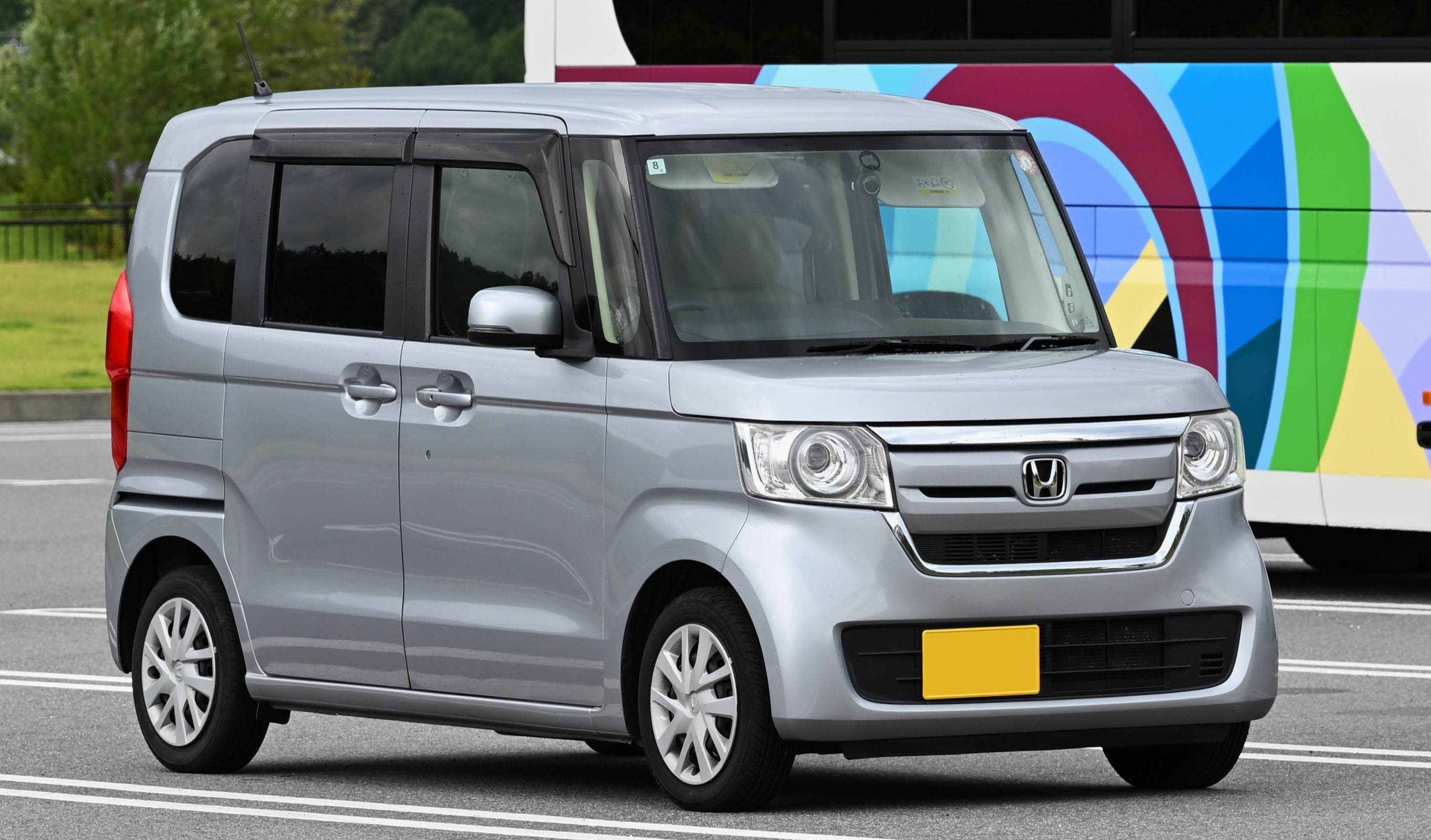

Overview
- Model code: JF3/4
- Production: September 2017 – 2023

Body and chassis
- Body style: 5-door minivan

Powertrain
- Engine: 658 cc S07A I3; 658 cc S07A turbo I3
- Power output: N/A: 43 kW (58 PS); Turbo: 47 kW (64 PS)
- Transmission: CVT

Dimensions
- Wheelbase: 2,520 mm (99.2 in)
- Length: 3,395 mm (133.7 in)
- Width: 1,475 mm (58.1 in)
- Height: 1,790 mm (70.5 in) (FWD); 1,815 mm (71.5 in) (4WD)
- Kerb weight: 890–1,030 kg (1,962–2,271 lb)

The second-generation N-Box was unveiled on 25 May 2017 and launched in Japan on 31 August 2017 via a livestream on YouTube. It went on sale on 1 September 2017.

=== Safety ===
The N-Box is equipped with Honda Sensing technology which includes pre-collision assist with pedestrian detection, lane departure warning with lane keeping assist, ultrasonic mis-acceleration mitigation system, and road sign assist.

=== Utility ===
The N-Box's seats can slide front to back, recline, and tip up and down separately or both to accommodate passengers, long and tall cargo and its slope can be used as an under-storage compartment and ramp for PWD wheelchairs.

By removing the seat's headrest, its refresh mode can be used as a bed.

=== 2021 facelift ===
The second-generation N-Box received a facelift in late December 2020. The headlights were altered slightly, while the grille was changed and the lower grille received a chrome crossbar. The Custom was also changed, receiving a more sculptured front grille and having the front license plate moved to the center of the bumper.

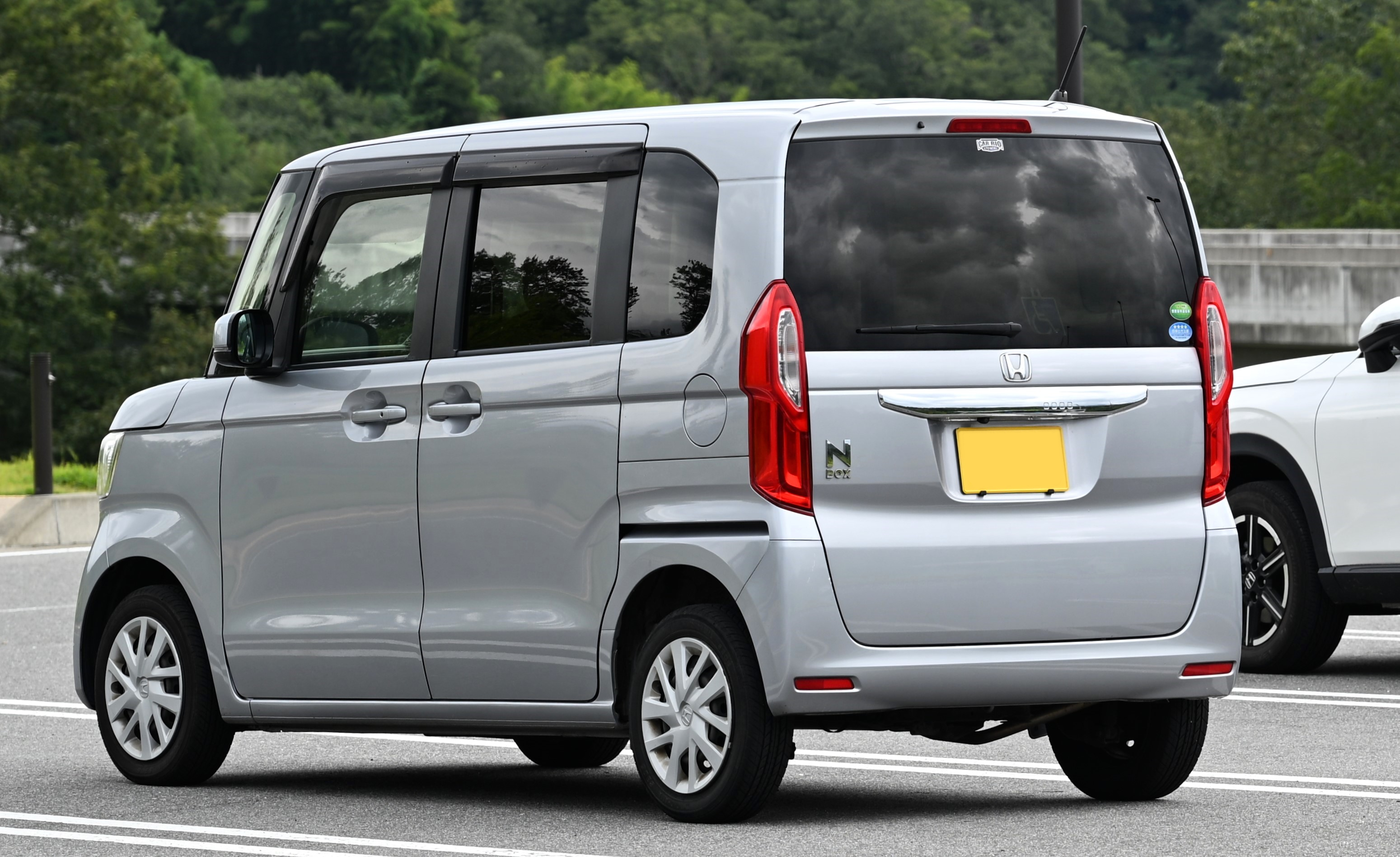
Rear view

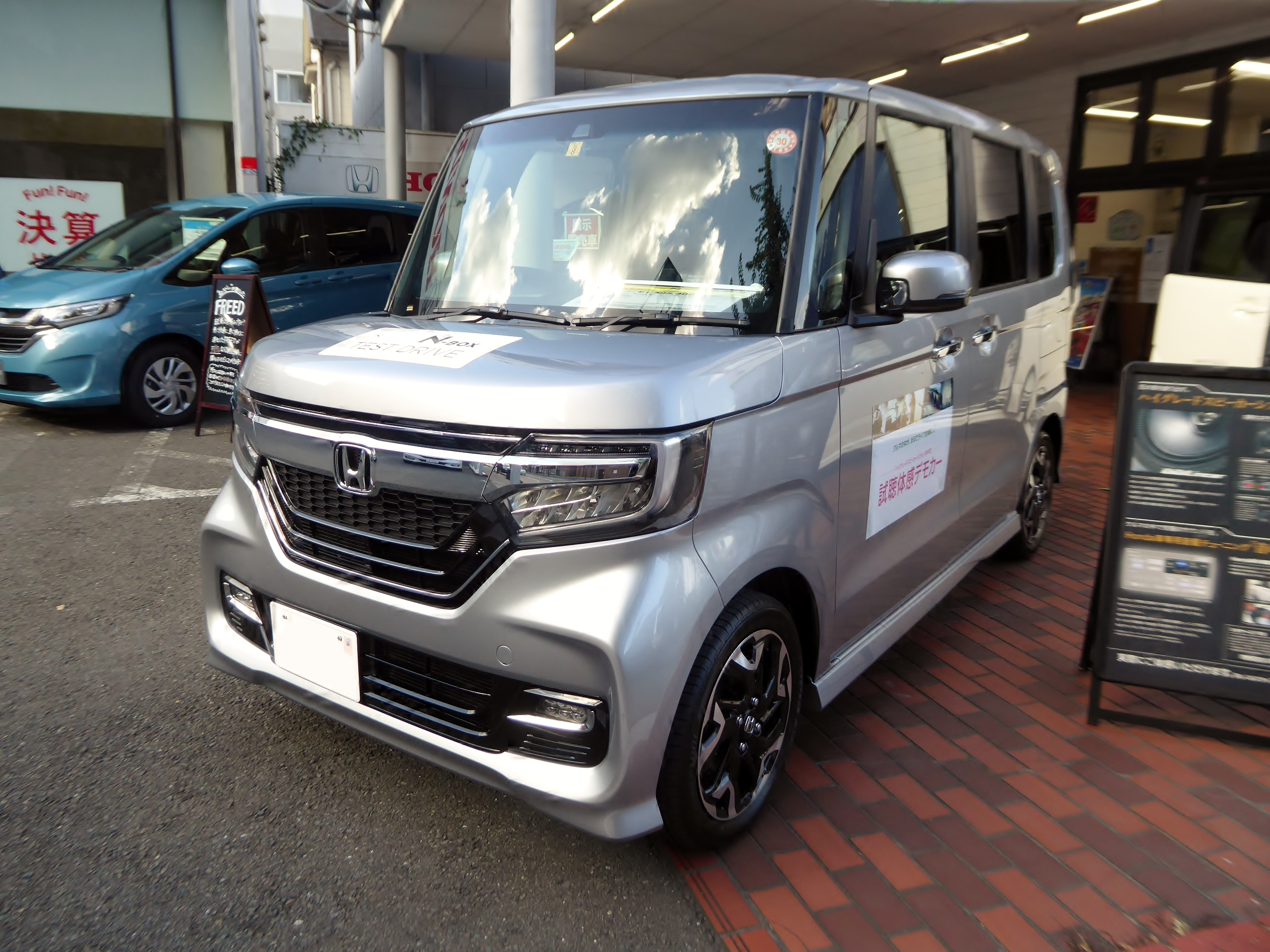
N-Box Custom G L Turbo

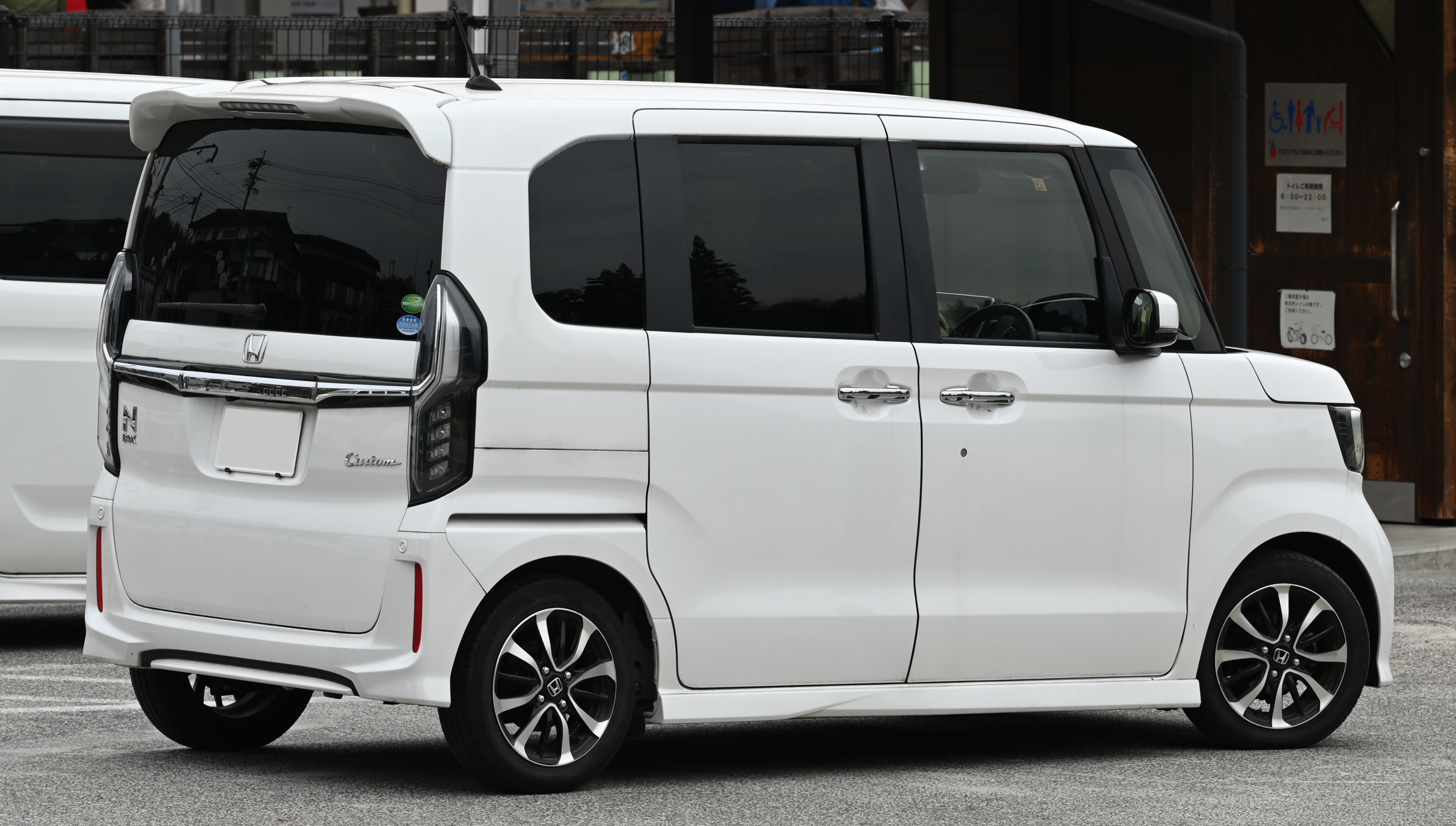
N-Box Custom

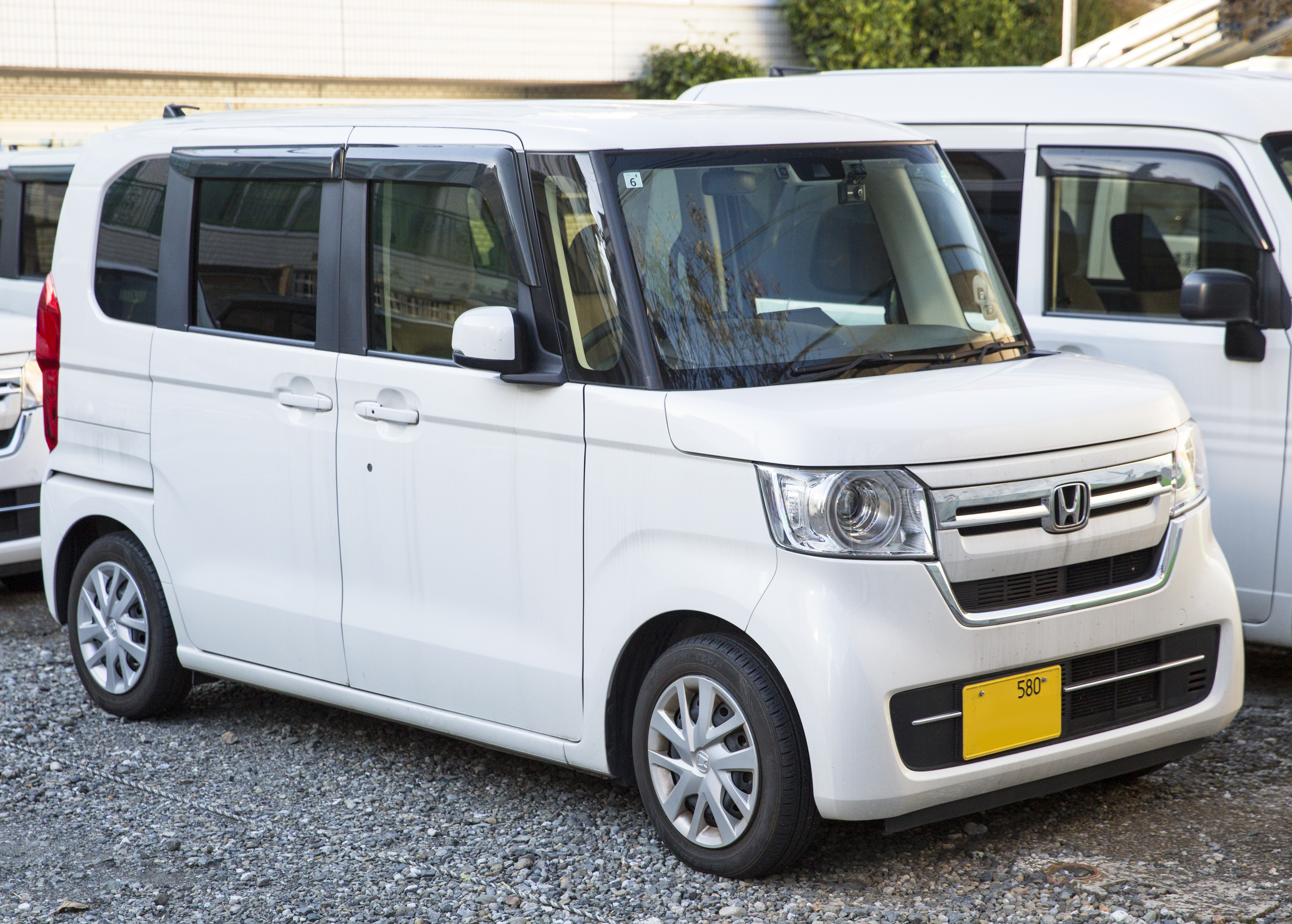
N-Box L (facelift)

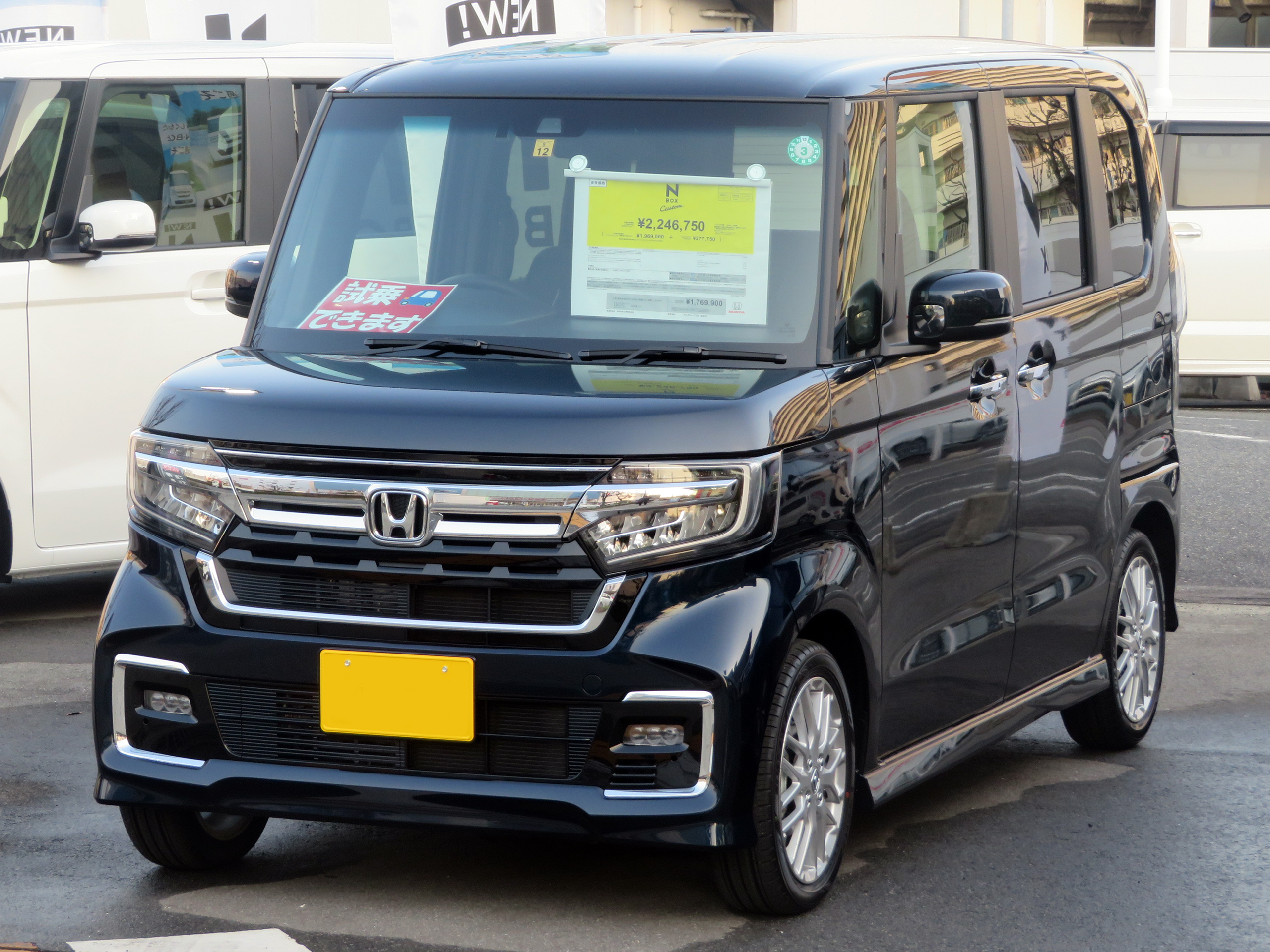
N-Box Custom L Turbo (facelift)

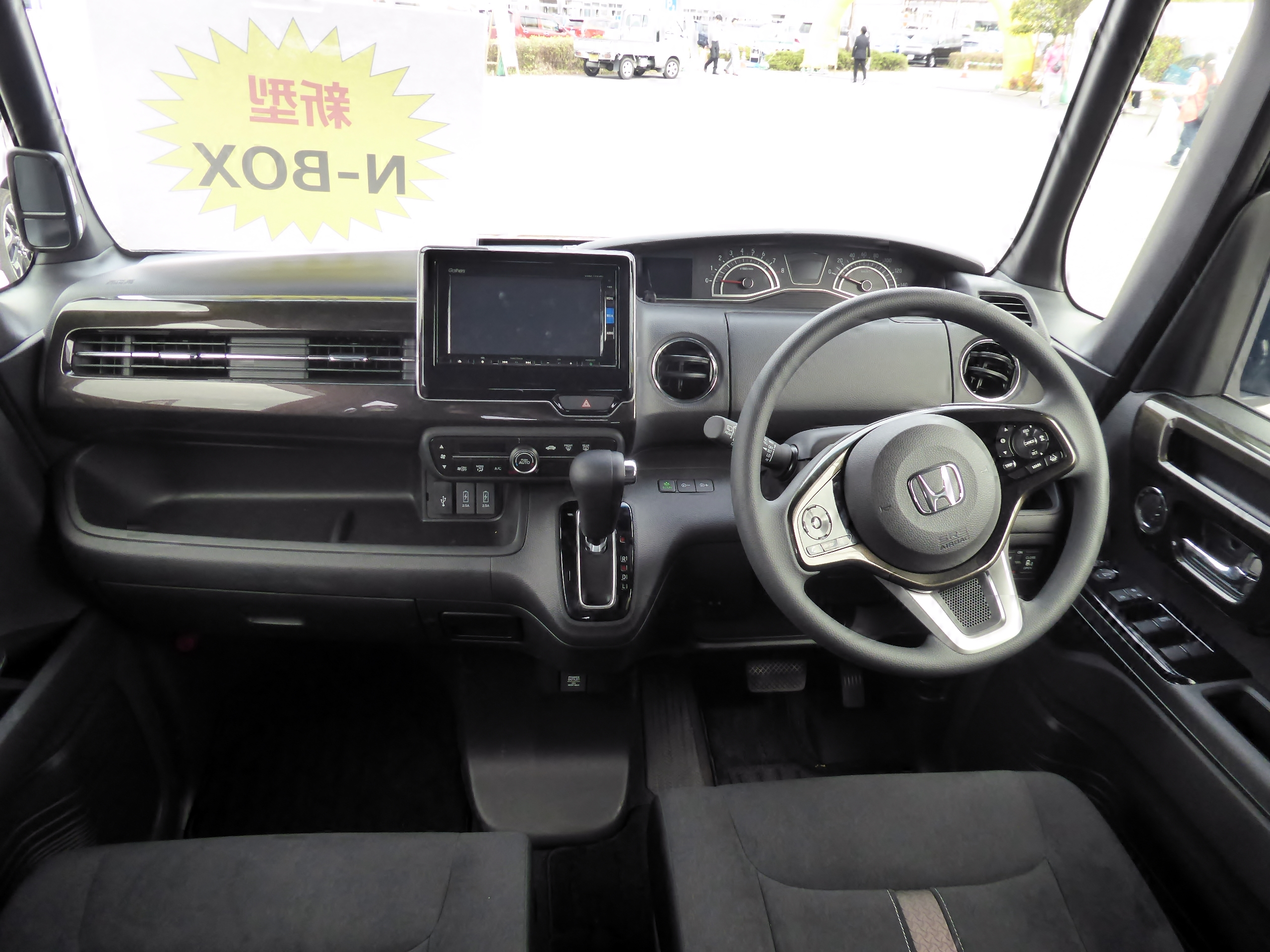
Interior

== Third generation (JF5/6; 2023) ==
Third generation
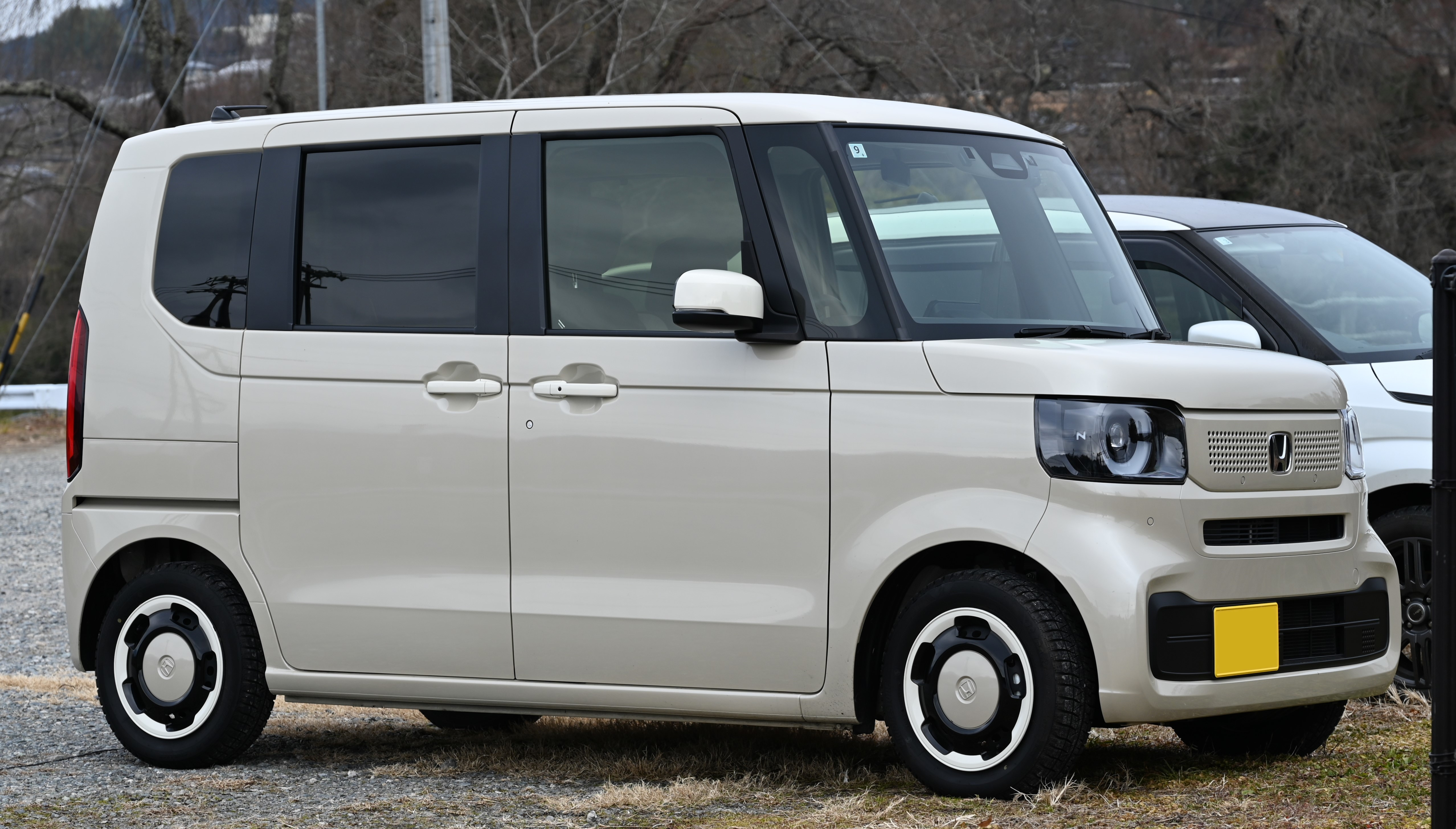
- Honda N-Box Fashion Style

Overview
- Model code: JF5/6
- Production: 2023–present

Body and chassis
- Body style: 5-door minivan

Powertrain
- Engine: 658 cc S07B I3; 658 cc S07B turbo I3
- Power output: N/A: 43 kW (58 PS); Turbo: 47 kW (64 PS)
- Transmission: CVT

Dimensions
- Wheelbase: 2,520 mm (99.2 in)
- Length: 3,395 mm (133.7 in)
- Width: 1,475 mm (58.1 in)
- Height: 1,790–1,815 mm (70.5–71.5 in)
- Kerb weight: 910–1,030 kg (2,006–2,271 lb)

The third-generation N-Box was unveiled on 3 August 2023 and was released on 5 October 2023.

The N-Box received a minor facelift on 18 June 2026. The facelift of the Custom grade features a redesigned bumper and LED-integrated headlights; the Joy grade features the Honda wordmark embossed around the grille and fog lights as standard; and the Fashion grade receives new tone paint in the roofline.

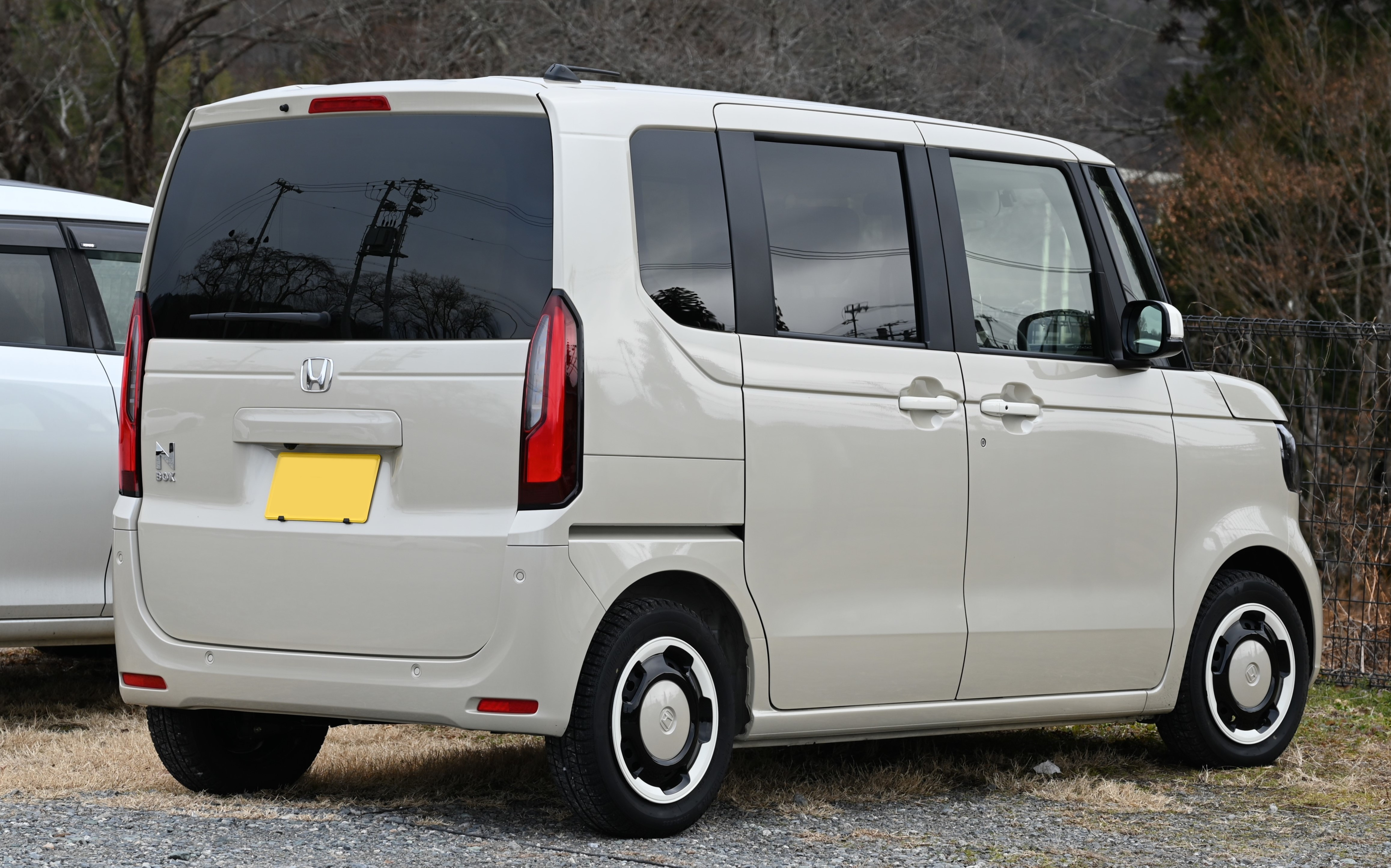
N-Box Fashion Style rear view

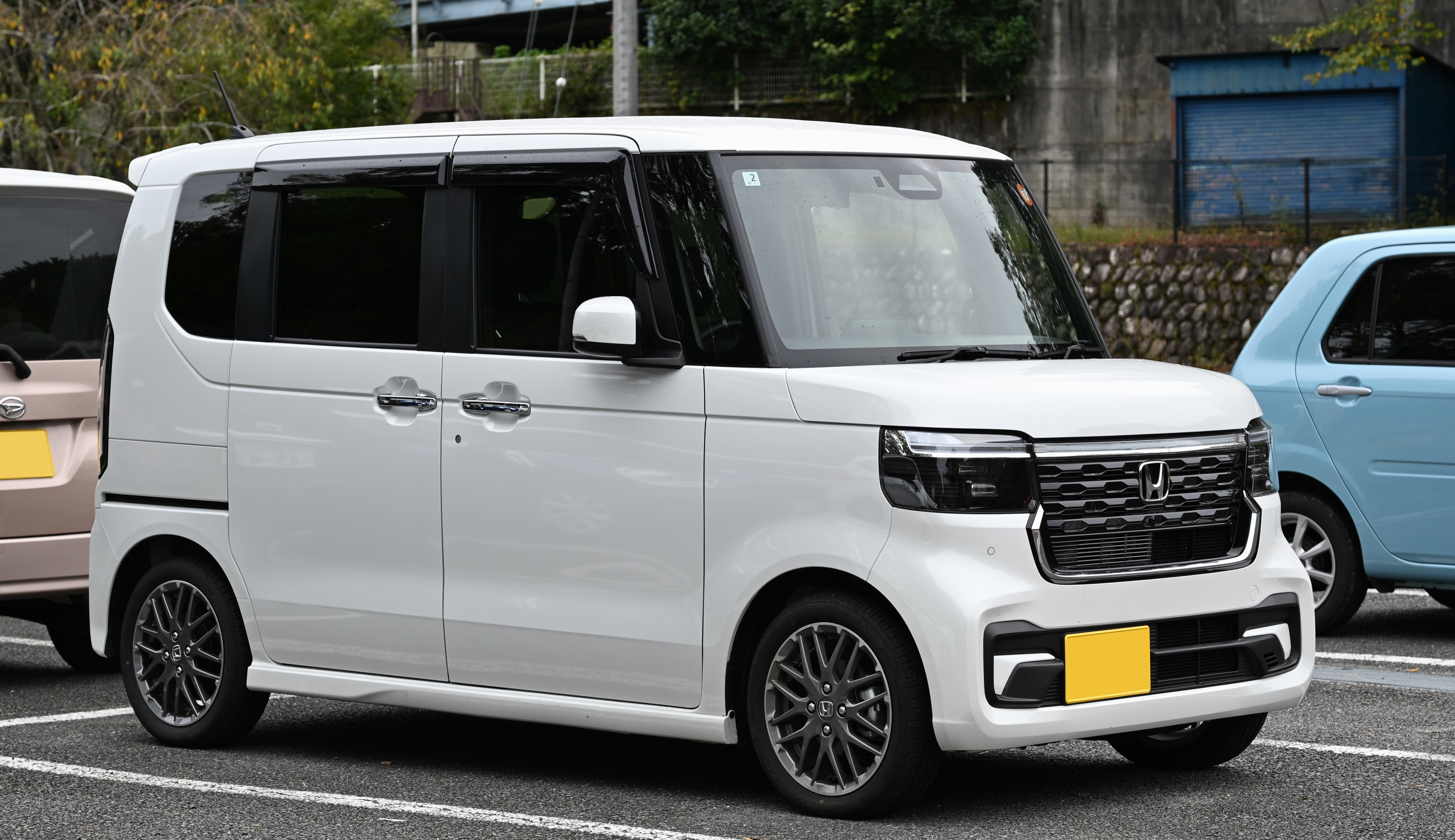
N-Box Custom Turbo front view

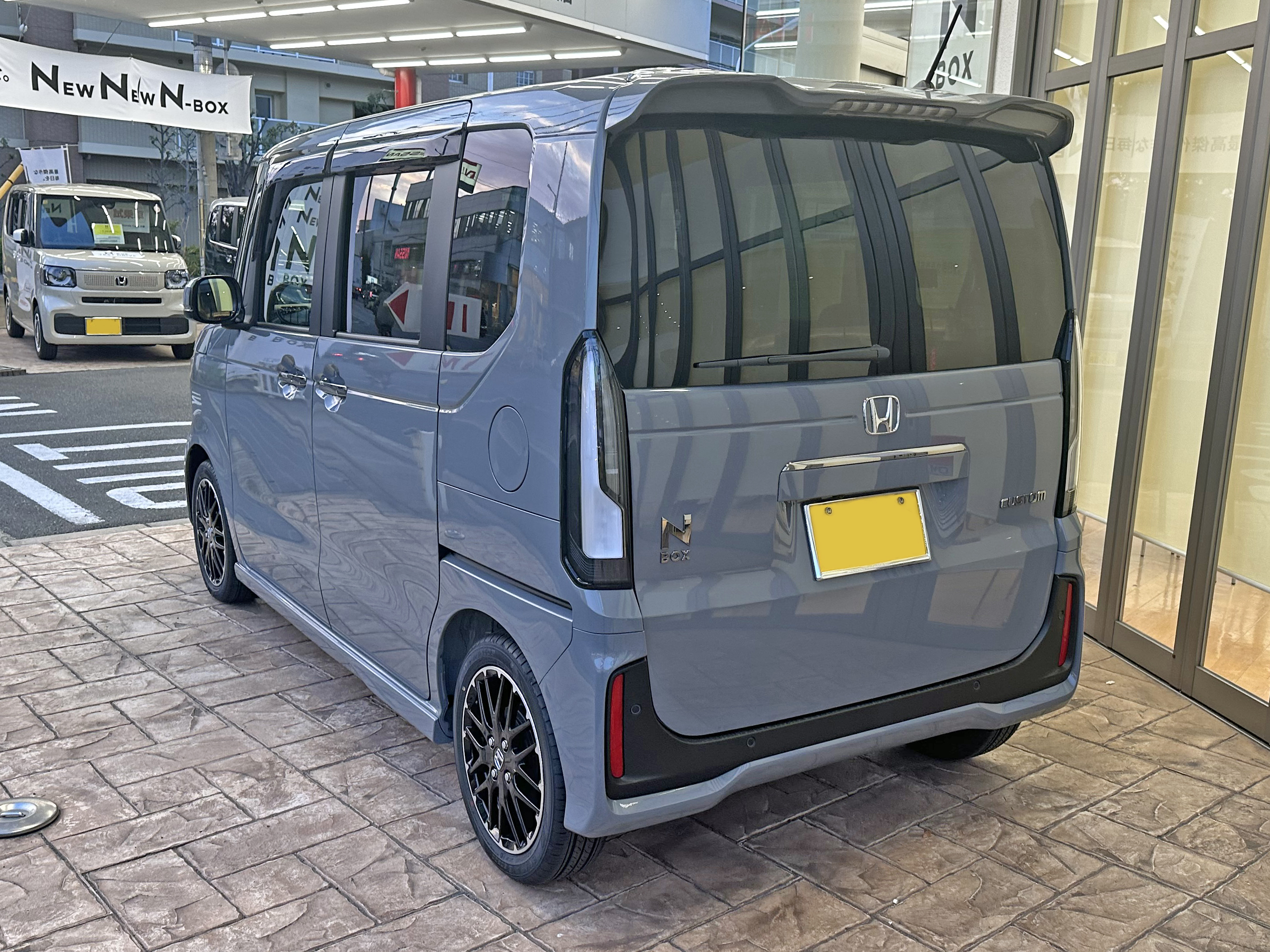
N-Box Custom Turbo Coordinate Style rear view

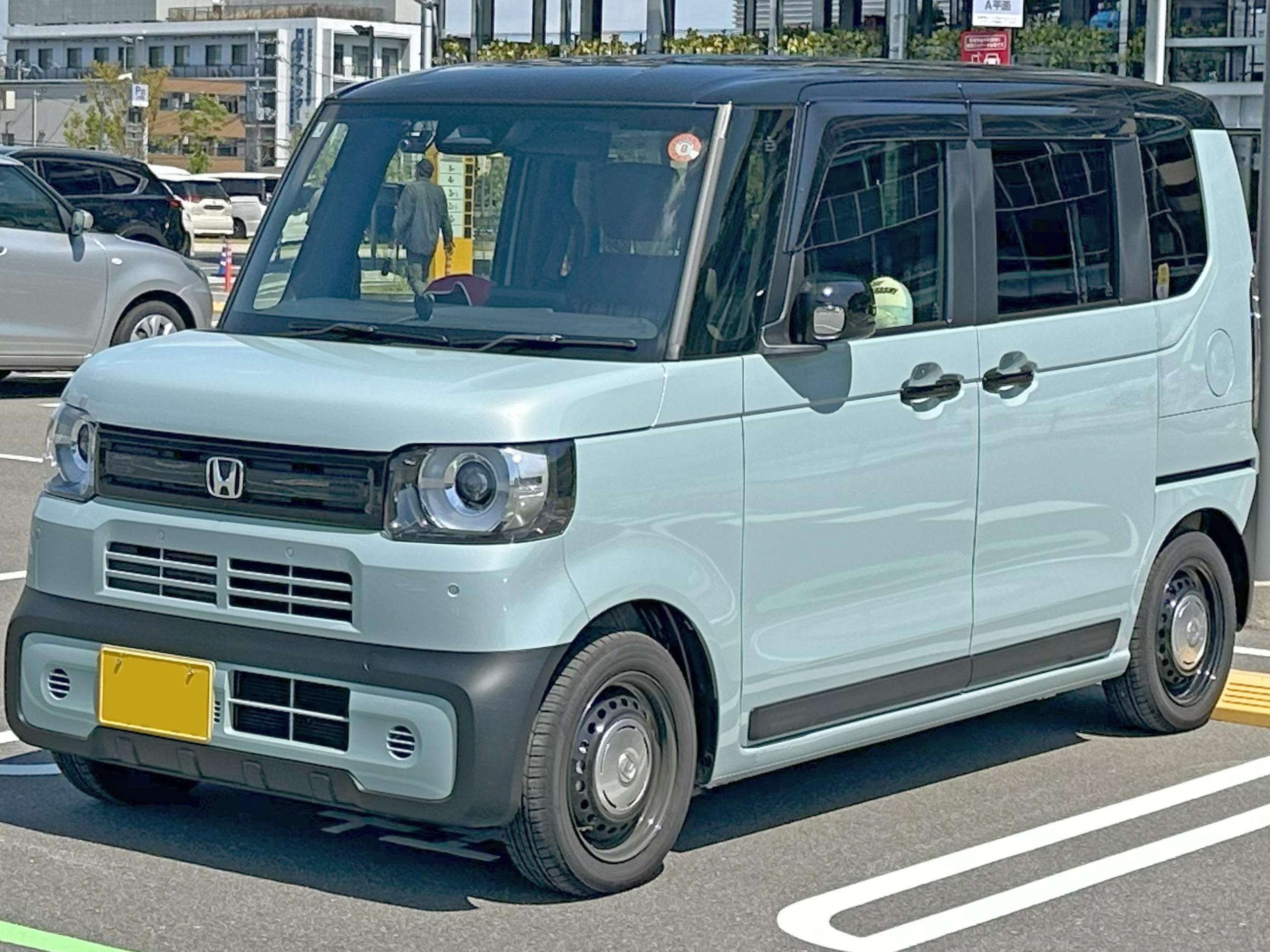
N-Box Joy

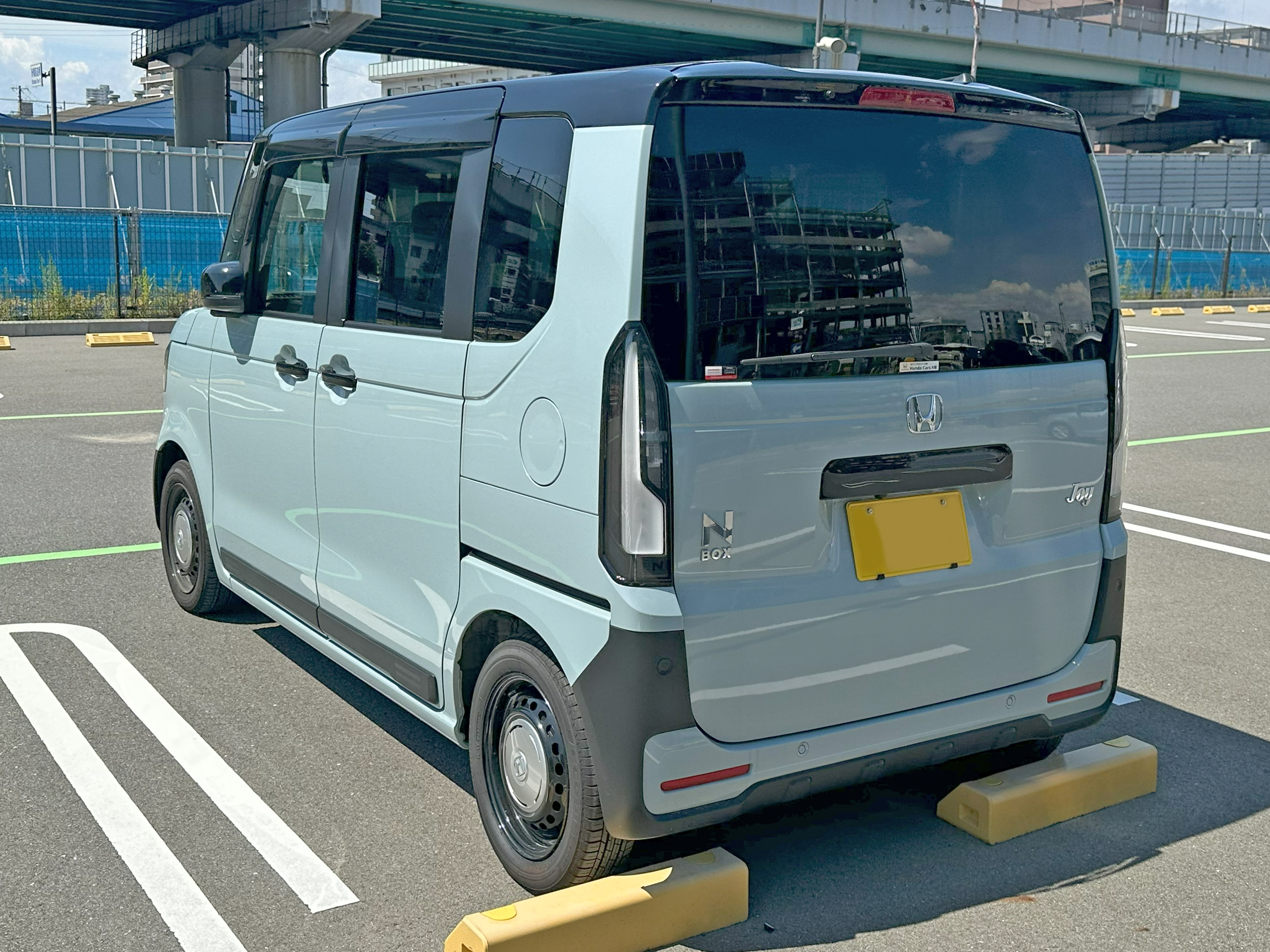
N-Box Joy rear view

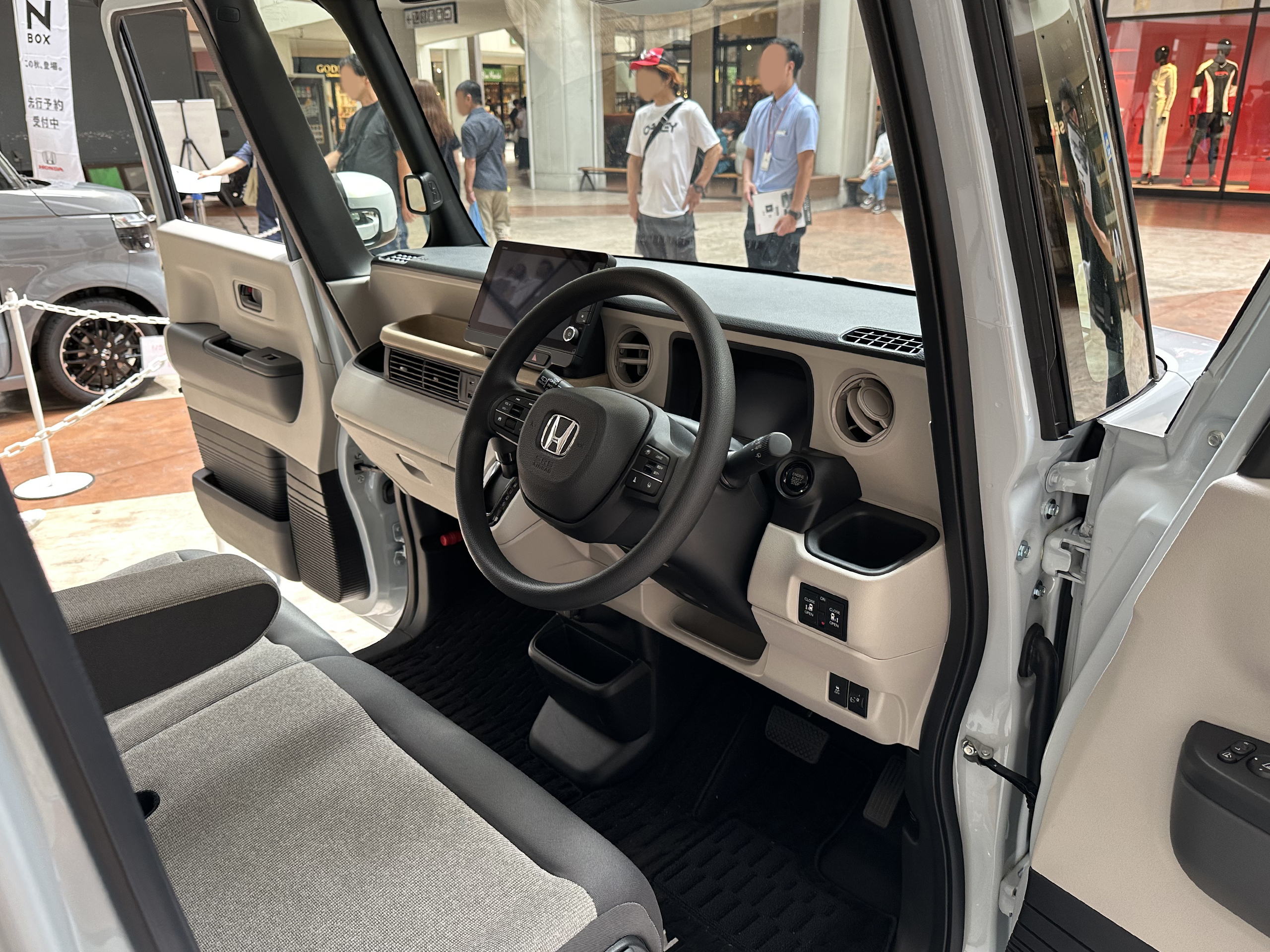
Interior

== Awards ==
- 2017–2018 Car of the Year from Japan Automotive Hall of Fame.
- 2018 Technology of the Year Award from Automotive Researchers' and Journalists' Conference of Japan for weight reduction technology.

== Sales ==
In December 2011, Honda set a monthly sales target at 12,000 units for the N-Box series. With the introduction of the second generation model, Honda increased the target to 15,000 units, and the N-Box exceeded above the target selling in 6-digit number figures.

| Year | Japan |
|---|---|
| 2011 | 2,860 |
| 2012 | 194,407 |
| 2013 | 207,844 |
| 2014 | 164,875 |
| 2015 | 156,857 |
| 2016 | 169,944 |
| 2017 | 207,999 |
| 2018 | 207,999 |
| 2019 | 247,770 |
| 2020 | 195,688 |
| 2021 | 188,939 |
| 2022 | 202,197 |
| 2023 | 231,385 |
| 2024 | 206,272 |
| 2025 | 201,354 |
