= Honda S engine =

Small Japanese gasoline engines

The S series is a three-cylinder gasoline engine developed and manufactured by Honda, with a total displacement of 658 cc. The engine is intended for kei car applications and replaced the earlier Honda P engine when it first appeared in November 2011. Honda's stated goal at the time of introduction was to have the most fuel efficient engines in every class in which they are present by 2014 and to achieve a 30 percent reduction in CO_{2} emissions across all of their vehicles by 2020 – which is why the engine family was marketed under the "Earth Dreams" Technology moniker. The second generation (S07B) appeared in 2017; it has the same overall displacement but is of a long-stroke design.

== S07 ==
Thanks to a lesser bore pitch, the engine could be made shorter. Combined with thinner walls in the block and elsewhere, such as the camshaft, the weight of the S07A was reduced by about 15 percent compared to the preceding P engine. Two versions of the S07A were available, one naturally aspirated and one turbocharged.

=== S07A (Earth Dreams) ===
- PGM-FI DOHC 12 Valve
- Displacement: 658.2 cc
- Bore & stroke: 64.0 mm × 68.2 mm
- Compression ratio: 11.2:1
- Power: 43 kW (58 PS; 57 hp) at 7,300 rpm
- Torque: 65 N⋅m (48 lb⋅ft) at 3,500 rpm
- Applications:
  - Honda N-One
  - Honda N-Box

=== S07A Turbo (Earth Dreams) ===
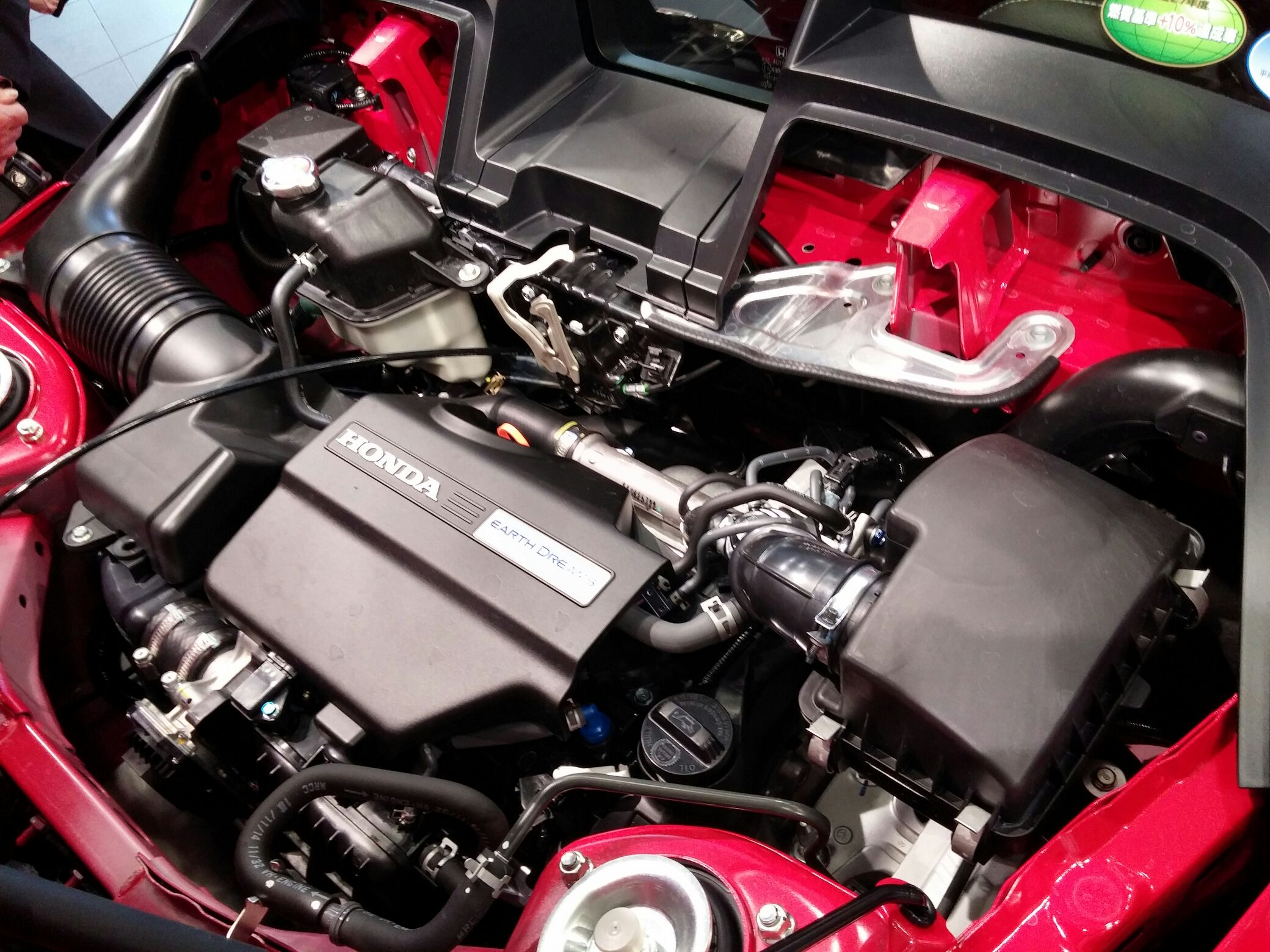
S07A Turbo in the S660

- PGM-FI DOHC 12 Valve
- Turbocharger
- Displacement: 658.2 cc
- Bore & stroke: 64.0 mm × 68.2 mm
- Compression ratio: 9.5:1
- Power: 47 kW (63 hp; 64 PS) / 6,000 rpm
- Torque: 10.6 kg⋅m (77 lb⋅ft; 104 N⋅m) / 2,600 rpm
- Applications:
  - Honda S660 (2015–2022)
  - Honda N-One
  - Honda N-Box

=== S07B ===
The S07B first appeared in the second generation N-Box in September 2017. It has a significantly longer stroke of 77.6 mm (3.06 in), which combines with a narrower, 60.0 mm (2.36 in) bore to provide a near identical displacement to that of the S07A. While power outputs are also near identical, the naturally aspirated engine is equipped with an i-VTEC variable valve timing and lift mechanism and continuously variable valve timing control mechanism, and the turbo engine is equipped with an electric wastegate valve.

==== Specifications ====
Naturally aspirated engine (reference
JF5 N-Box)

- Valve mechanism: DOHC i-VTEC, chain drive, 2 intake, 2 exhaust
- Displacement: 658 cc
- Bore x stroke: 60.0 mm × 77.6 mm (2.36 in × 3.06 in)
- Compression ratio: 12.0:1
- Fuel supply: Electronically controlled fuel injection (PGM-FI)
- Power: 43 kW (58 PS; 57 hp) at 7,300 rpm
- Torque: 65 N⋅m (48 lb⋅ft) at 4,800 rpm
- Applications:
  - N-Box (JF5/6)
  - N-Van (JJ1/2)
  - N-WGN (JH3/4)
  - N-One (JG3/4)

Turbo (reference
JF5 N-Box)

- Valve mechanism: DOHC, chain drive, 2 intake, 2 exhaust
- Displacement: 658 cc
- Bore x stroke: 60.0 mm × 77.6 mm (2.36 in × 3.06 in)
- Compression ratio: 9.8:1
- Fuel supply: Electronically controlled fuel injection (PGM-FI)
- Power: 47 kW (64 PS; 63 hp) at 6,000 rpm
- Torque: 104 N⋅m (77 lb⋅ft) at 2,600 rpm
- Applications:
  - N-Box (JF5/6)
  - N-Van (JJ1/2)
  - N-WGN (JH3/4)
  - N-One (JG3/4)

== See also ==
- List of Honda engines
