= Honda N-series =

The Honda N series is a series of Kei cars by Honda.

These are renewed line-up of Kei class city cars.The "N" prefix was previously used for the late 1960s and 1970s Honda N360; originally it stood for norimono which loosely translates to vehicle. For the new N lineup, the "N" represented New, Next, Nippon, and Norimono.

== Overview ==
The N in the N series is the N for Norimono (vehicle), and it has the meaning of "not just a machine, but something for people to ride," and from the first-generation N360 onwards, it is a light car series that aims to create "people-centered" cars.

Honda also uses the phrase "want to create a good life" as a phrase that is almost synonymous with the fundamental concept of "people-centered" but is expressed in a different way. To put this in another way, it is a light vehicle that makes it possible to realize the idea that "having a car makes your life richer." Specifically, when we say "enriching your life," we mean being able to travel further, having more opportunities to spend time together, having a place to think alone, enjoying life, and being more convenient. The series aims to "change the lives of the people who purchase it," and provides light vehicles that will help improve the quality of life and make people's lives happier.

== Models ==
- Honda N360

Positioned as the origin of the series. Launched in 1967, this classic model featured various engines tailored to the era and market.

- Honda N-Box

Released in 2011. Developed under the concept of “New Next Nippon Norimono,” it became the catalyst for subsequent variations sharing this theme. Features sliding doors on both sides for rear seating. Derivative models include the “N-BOX+” (released 2012), featuring enhanced cargo space arrangements, and the “N-BOX SLASH” (released 2014), a low-roof variant without sliding doors.

- Honda N-One

Released in 2012. Inspired by the N360. Features a hatchback-style design.

- Honda N-WGN

Released in 2013. Its relationship to the N360 is that it belongs to the lineage of tall wagons originating from the Life. It shares part of its name with Stepwgn.

- Honda N-Van

Released in 2018. A derivative of the second-generation N-Box and the first light commercial vehicle in the N Series.

== Awards ==
Good Design Award (Japan)

- 2012 - Good Design Gold Award。
- 2023 - Good Design Long Life Design Award

== Related Models ==
- Honda Z

The first generation was a derivative of the N360. The second generation is a kei SUV that shares its platform with no other model.

- Honda Life

The successor to the N360 and the predecessor to the N-WGN.

- Honda That's

A derivative model of the Life, serving as both the predecessor to the Zest and the predecessor to the N-One.

- Honda Zest

The successor to the That's and the predecessor to the N-One.

- Honda Acty van

The previous generation of the N-VAN G/L.

- Vamos & Vamos Hobio

A derivative model of the Acty Van and the predecessor to the N-VAN +STYLE COOL/FUN.

- Super-ONE

A slightly larger derivative of the N-ONE e:.
