= Honda P engine =

Small Japanese gasoline engines

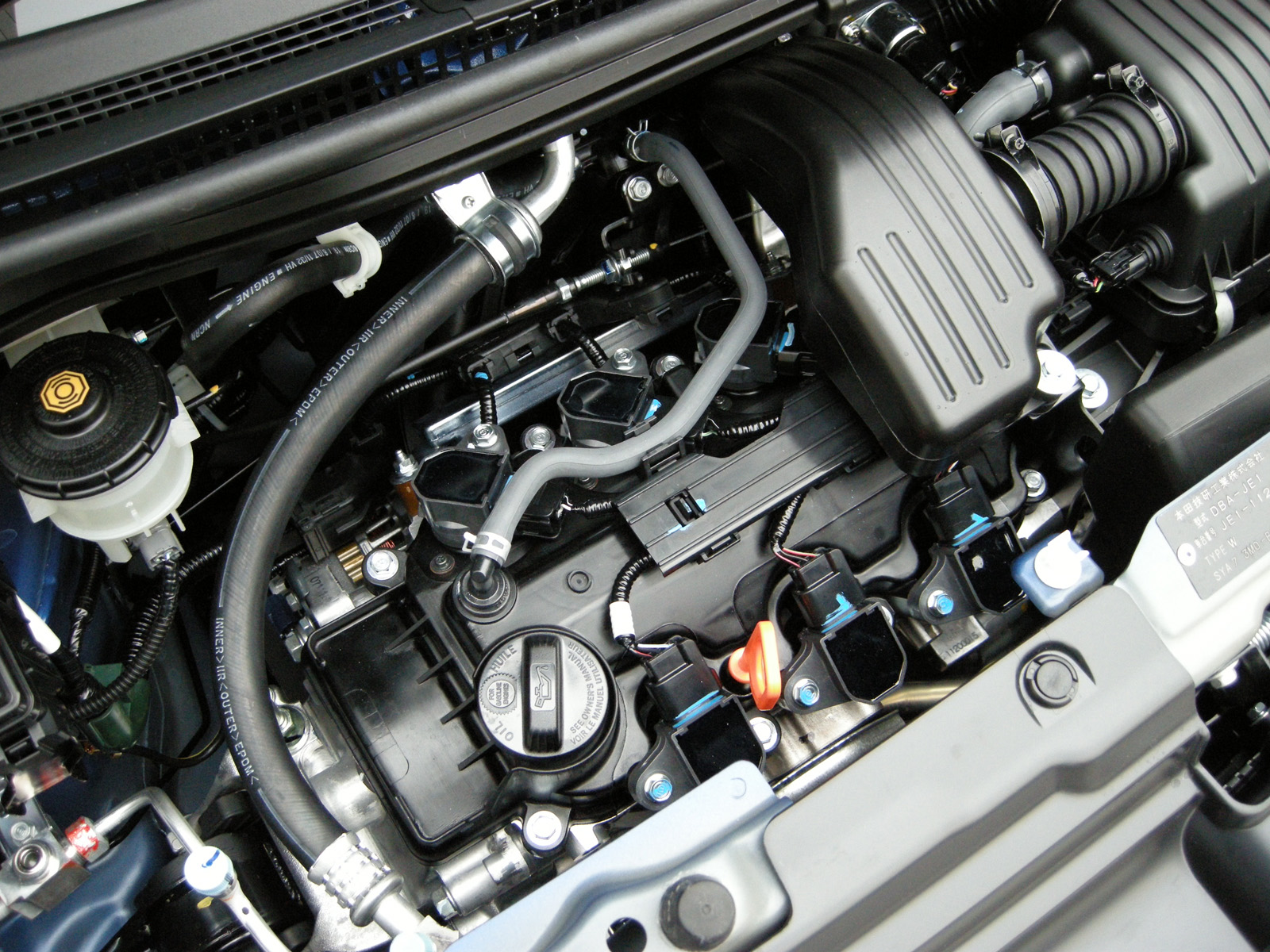
Honda P07A engine

The Honda P engine is an inline three-cylinder gasoline engine first designed for use in Honda kei cars. The P engine was first used in the fourth generation Honda Life, as a successor to the Honda E07A engine. The P engine series was initially produced in only one displacement variant: 658 cc, either naturally aspirated or turbocharged (the legislated maximum displacement of engines used in kei cars is 660 cc). A turbocharged one-litre version, the P10A, has since been developed. The smaller version was discontinued in December 2013, when it was replaced by the new S07 series engine, but the P10A continues to be built in Thailand.

== Design ==
The P-series engine was introduced in the fourth generation Honda Life in September, 2003. The engine uses a single overhead camshaft to drive two valves per cylinder (one intake, one exhaust, for a total of six). It also features the i-DSI ("intelligent dual and sequential ignition") spark ignition system, which utilizes two spark plugs per cylinder. The spark plugs fire sequentially, one after the other, in order to more completely burn the fuel charge for more power, lower fuel consumption and lower emissions. Fuel is delivered using Honda's PGM-FI electronic fuel injection system.

An unusual feature of this engine's design is that it does not have a separate exhaust manifold. Instead the exhaust gasses collect in the passages of the cylinder head itself and are fed directly into the catalytic converter. Honda claims this design helps to warm the catalyst quicker in order to more effectively filter out harmful emissions.

The larger P10A shares an 80 mm (3.15 in) bore spacing and most other basic dimensions with the 1.5-liter four-cylinder NA engine, increasing parts commonality and simplifying manufacture.

== Variants ==
=== P07A ===
- i-DSI SOHC 6 valves
- Displacement: 658 cc
- Bore × stroke (mm): 71.0 × 55.4
- Power:
  - September, 2003 - October, 2008: 38 kW (52 PS; 51 hp) at 6,700 rpm
  - November, 2008–2013: 38 kW (52 PS; 51 hp) at 7,100 rpm
- Torque:
  - September, 2003 - October, 2008: 61 N·m (6.2 kgf·m; 45 lb·ft) at 3,800 rpm
  - November, 2008–2013: 60 N·m (6.1 kgf·m; 44 lb·ft) at 3,600 rpm
- Used in:
  - Honda Life (JB5, JB6, JC1, JC2)
  - Honda Zest (JE1, JE2)

=== P07A (turbocharged) ===
- i-DSI SOHC 6 valves
- Turbocharged
- Displacement: 658 cc
- Bore × stroke (mm): 71.0 × 55.4
- Power: 47 kW (64 PS; 63 hp) at 6,000 rpm
- Torque: 93 N·m (9.5 kgf·m; 69 lb·ft) at 4,000 rpm
- Used in:
  - Honda Life (JB7, JB8, JC1, JC2)
  - Honda Zest (JE1, JE2)

=== P10A2 ===
- i-VTEC Earth Dreams DOHC 12-valves
- Turbocharged
- Displacement: 988 cc
- Bore × stroke (mm): 73.0 × 78.7
- Power: 95 kW (130 PS; 128 hp) at 5,500 rpm
- Torque: 200 N⋅m (148 lb⋅ft) at 2,250 rpm
- Used in the:
  - Honda Civic hatchback (FK6; UK)
  - Honda Civic sedan (China)
  - Honda Crider/Envix (China)

=== P10A6 ===
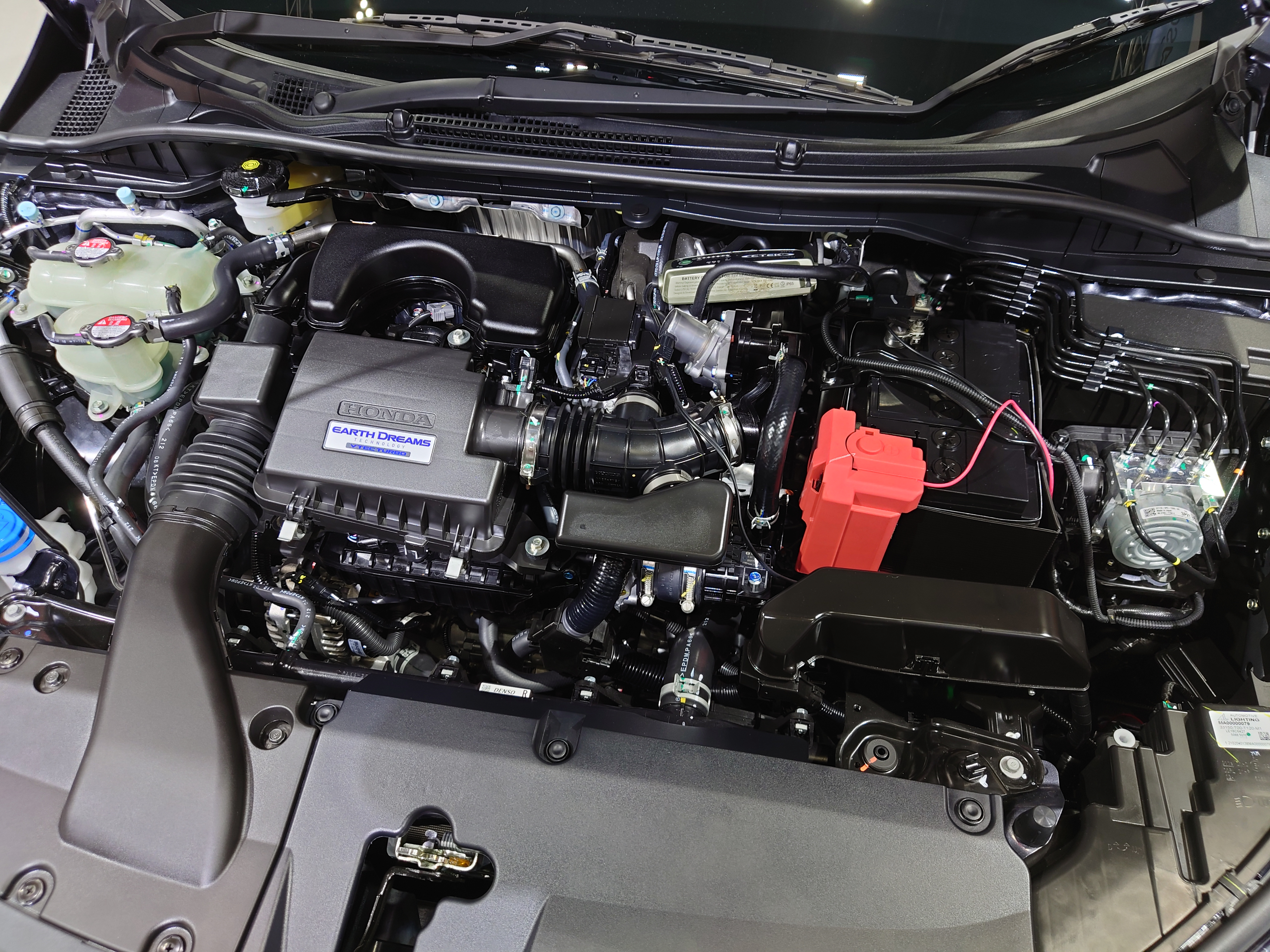
Honda P10A6 Engine

- VTEC Turbo Earth Dreams DOHC 12-valves
- Turbocharged
- Displacement: 988 cc
- Bore × stroke (mm): 73.0 × 78.7
- Power: 91 kW (122 PS; 120 hp) at 5,500 rpm
- Torque: 173 N⋅m (128 lb⋅ft) at 2,000 – 4,500 rpm
- Used in:
  - Honda City (GN1 and GN7; Thailand)

== See also ==
- Honda E07A engine
