= Honda Z =

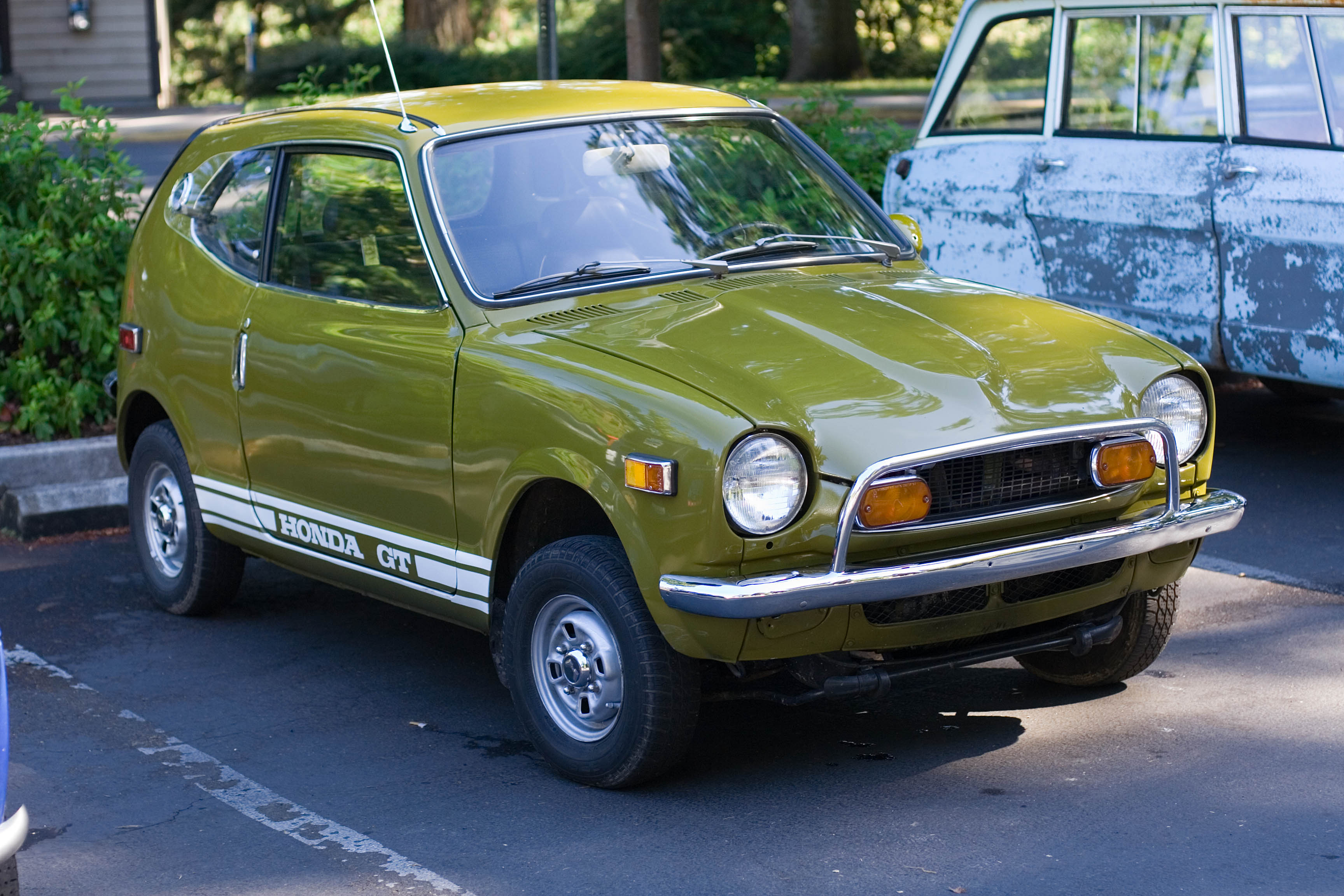

Overview
- Manufacturer: Honda
- Also called: Honda 600 coupe Honda AZ600; Honda Z360/Z600; Honda Coupe
- Production: 1970–1974; 1998–2002

Body and chassis
- Class: Z600 Microcar; Z360 Kei car
- Body style: 2-door coupé
- Layout: FF layout
- Related: N360/600

Powertrain
- Engine: 354 cc I2; 356 cc EA I2; 598 cc I2
- Transmission: 4/5-speed manual 2-speed Hondamatic

Dimensions
- Wheelbase: 2,000 mm (78.7 in)
- Length: 3,125 mm (123.0 in)
- Width: 1,295 mm (51.0 in)
- Height: 1,280 mm (50.4 in)
- Curb weight: 595 kg (1,312 lb)

Chronology
- Successor: Honda Today (Z360); Honda Civic (600 variants)

The Honda Z (marketed also as the Z600) is a two-door kei car/city car manufactured and marketed by the Honda Motor Company, from 1970 until 1974. Exports mostly ended after 1972, when the domestic market models received redesigned pillarless bodywork.

Honda subsequently marketed a kei-class SUV from 1998 to 2002, bearing no relation to the first 'Z', but bearing the same nameplate.

== 1970–1974 ==
The two-door Honda Z debuted in October 1970 and was marketed until 1973 in most countries. American sales (only with the larger 598 cc engine) lasted for model years 1970 through 1972, ending prior to the 1973 introduction of the Civic. Marketed as the "sport coupé" version of the N600, the two were sold side by side at American motorcycle dealerships until the first stand-alone automobile dealers opened to market the Civic. Total production was 40,586 units.

In certain countries, such as the US, the Z600 name simply reflected the engine's size of 598 cc (36 cu in). The smaller-engined Honda Z360 was available in Japan (and other markets, such as Australia) with a 354 cc (22 cu in) twin. In the UK they came only in 600 cc form and were called simply "Honda Z" with no mention of the engine size in the name.

As with all cars in the kei class, the Z360's specifications were tightly governed. The Z360 originally featured an air-cooled, 354 cc, two-cylinder SOHC engine with a four- or five-speed transmission driving the front wheels. Outputs were 31 PS (23 kW; 31 hp) at 8,500 rpm for the Act and Pro versions, and 36 PS (26 kW; 36 hp) at 9,000 rpm for the sportier TS and GS models. The Z600 model's 598 cc SOHC engine was rated at 36 PS (26 kW; 36 hp). In December 1971, the Z360 received a facelift and a water-cooled engine, it also produced 36 PS (26 kW; 36 hp) at 9,000 rpm. Only a month later, the 31 PS engine used in the lower spec variants (Standard, Deluxe, Automatic, Custom) also became water-cooled. The engine's technical achievements reflected influences from Honda's larger, 1.3 L, air-cooled four-cylinder used in the Honda 1300 coupe and sedan.

The Z featured coil sprung and independent front suspension and leaf springs on a beam axle rear suspension. The interior accommodated two adults, with a very small rear seat. A rear glass hatch with a black plastic surround opened to a shallow cargo area. Below the cargo area a compartment, accessible via a lid beneath the number plate, held the spare wheel and tools. Later versions, after a November 1972 facelift, deleted the extra lid and also moved the license plate down to the position it vacated. These also received the new EA engine of 356 cc (22 cu in), now only available in a more powerful, 36 PS (26 kW; 36 hp) version. Production ended in 1974, after the new Civic had arrived and the oil crisis had diminished the market for "fun" cars.

=== Europe ===
In Europe only the Z600 was marketed, as the Z360 had been considered underpowered. 918 cars were sold in Europe, most of them in France and Switzerland. A large number of these cars found their way to Germany (where it had not been marketed), where the engines were downsleeved to 242 cc in order to fit a particular "Class IV" category of driver's licenses which did not require an exam. These models first appeared in 1969 after the last 250 cc car in regular production, the Goggomobil 250, had been discontinued. The engine offered from 12.5 to 14 PS (9.2 to 10.3 kW) and provided a top speed of 85 km/h (53 mph).

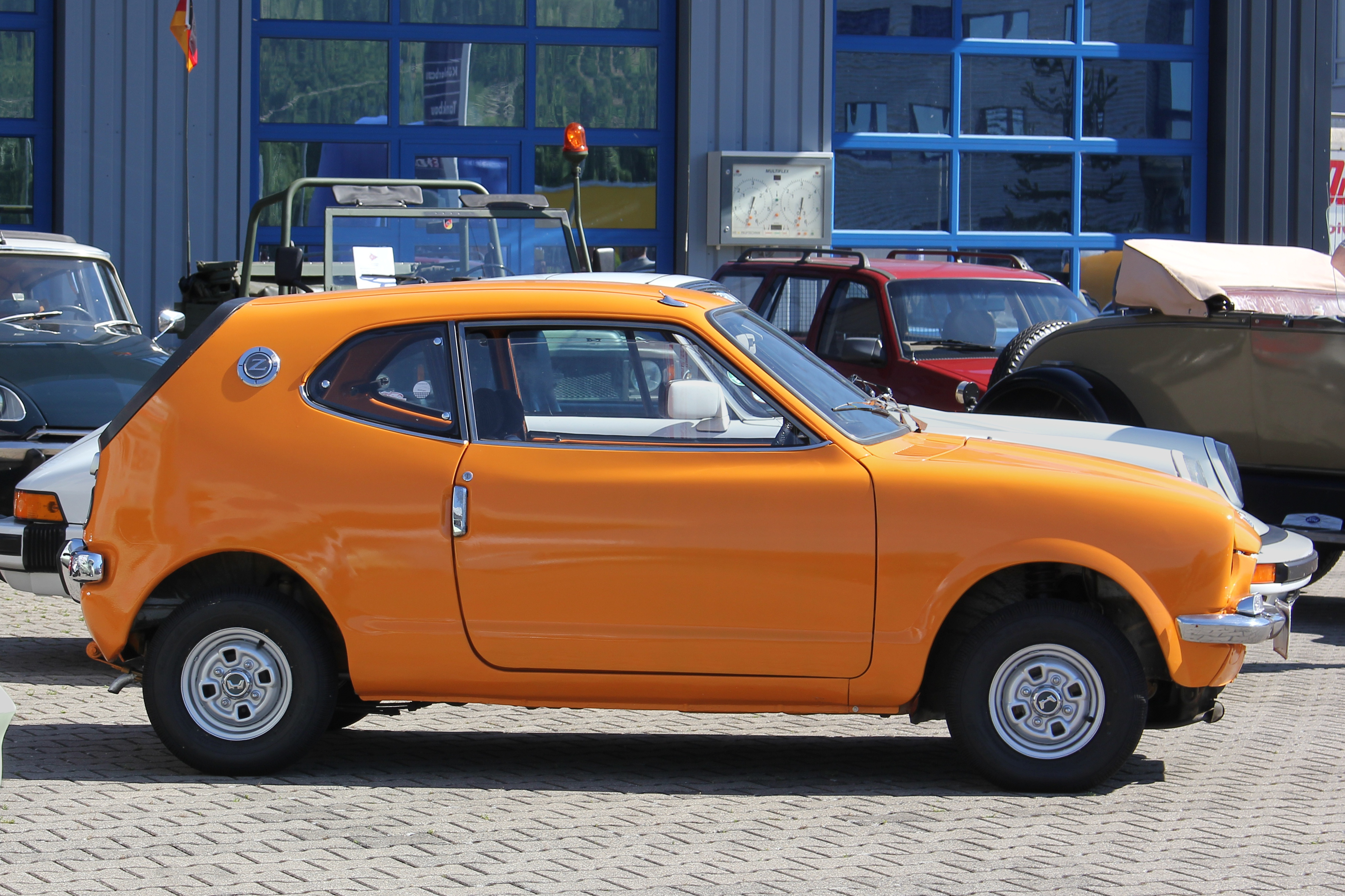
Honda Z 600

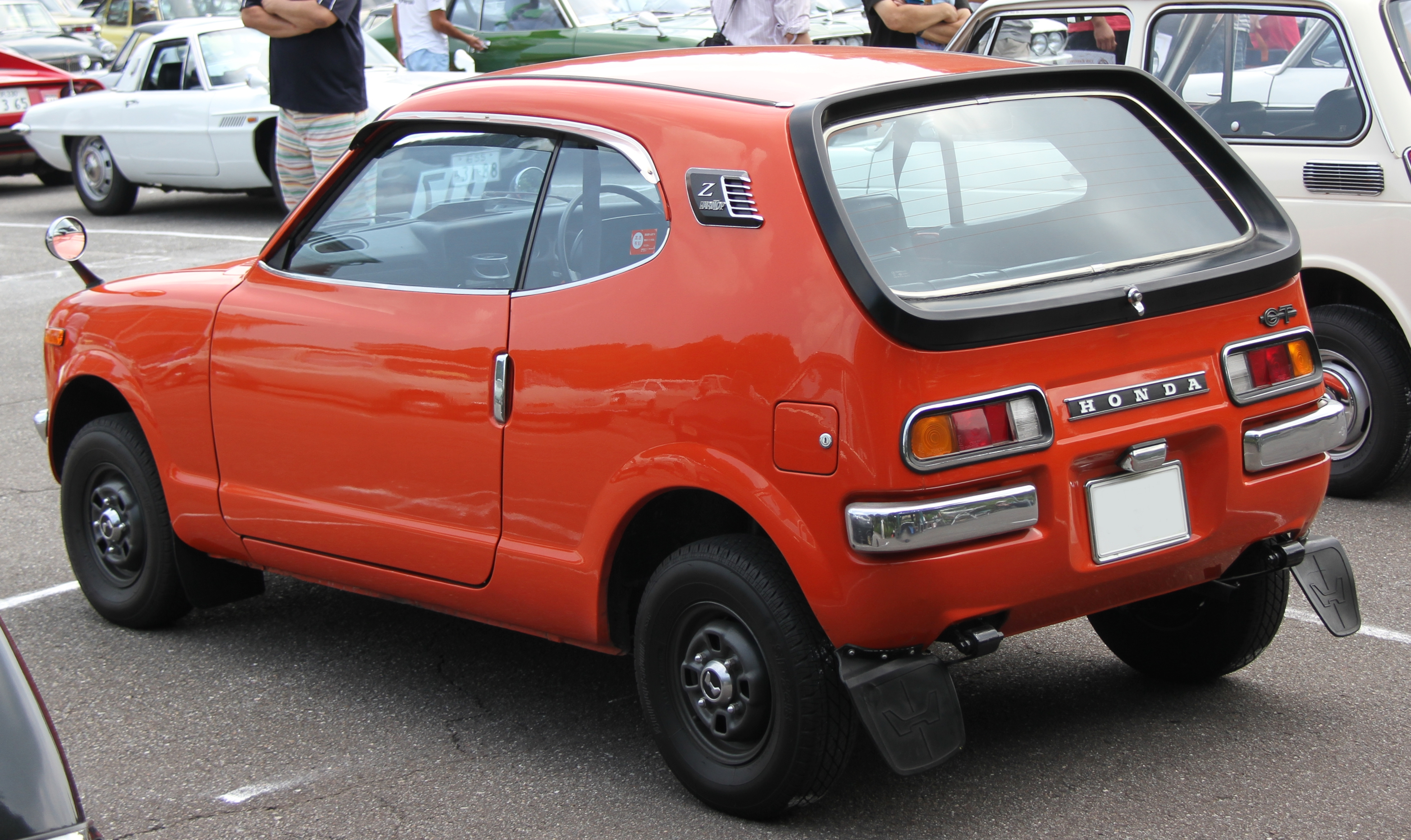
Late Honda Z360 GT, note pillarless design

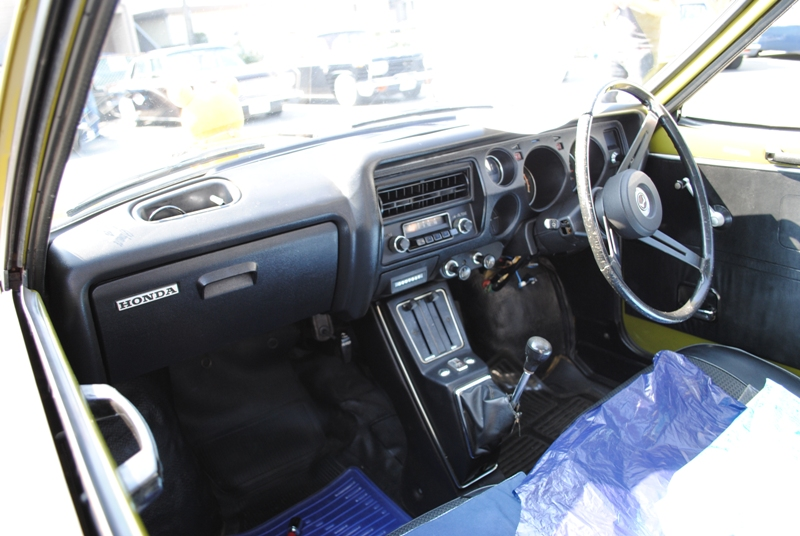
Interior

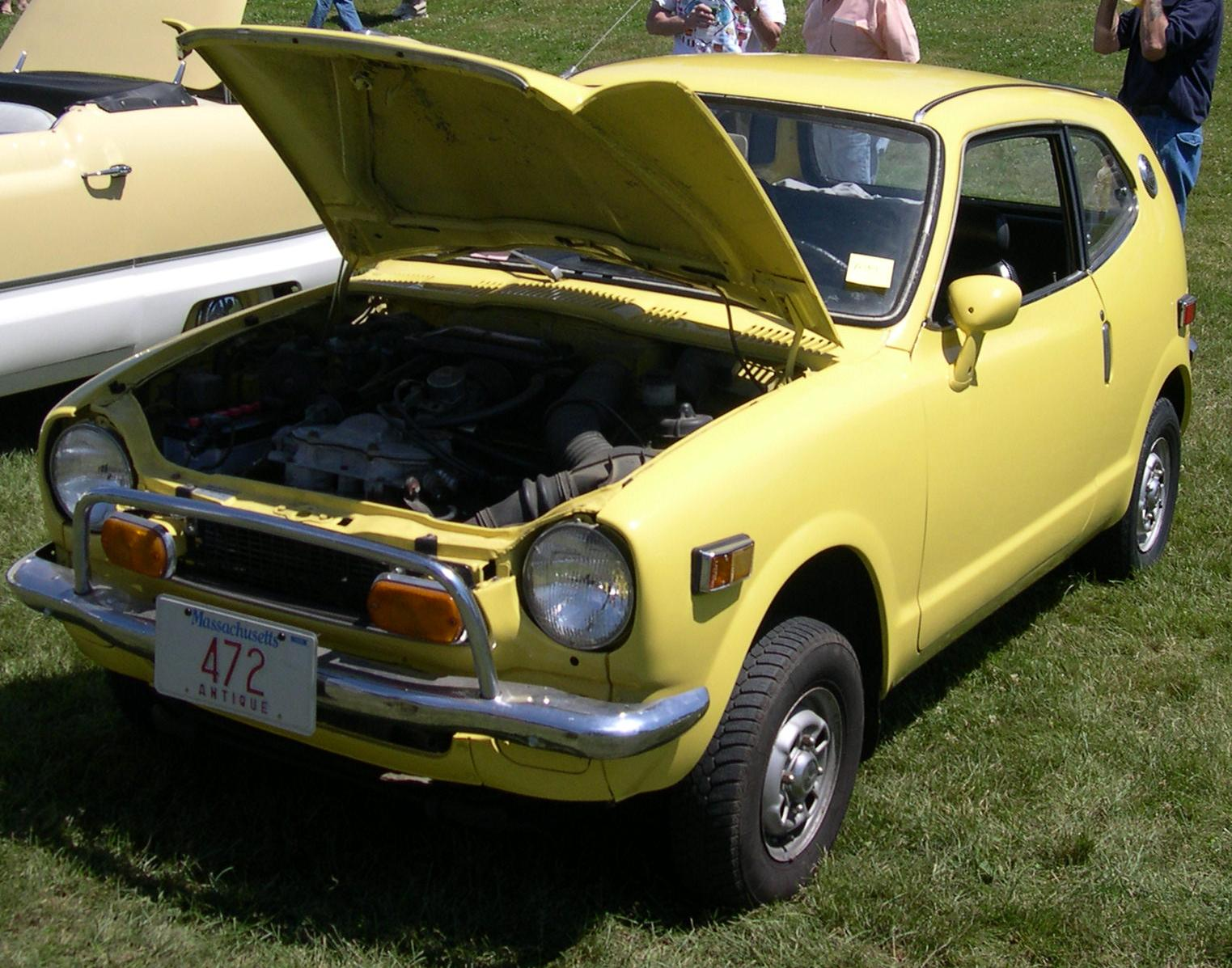
1972 Honda Z360

== 1998–2002 ==
Honda Z
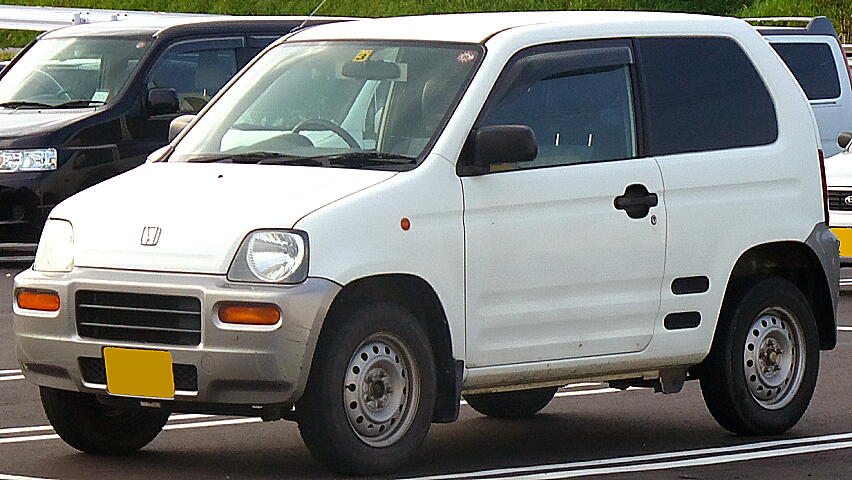

Overview
- Manufacturer: Honda
- Production: 1998–2002

Body and chassis
- Class: Kei car
- Body style: 2-door Mini SUV
- Layout: M4 layout / AWD
- Related: Honda Life

Powertrain
- Engine: 656 cc E07Z NA/turbo I3
- Transmission: 4-speed automatic

Dimensions
- Wheelbase: 2,360 mm (92.9 in)
- Length: 3,395 mm (133.7 in)
- Width: 1,475 mm (58.1 in)
- Height: 1,675 mm (65.9 in)
- Curb weight: 960–970 kg (2,116–2,138 lb)

Chronology
- Successor: Honda Life Dunk; Honda That's; Honda HR-V (as an SUV)

The Honda Z was a retro-styled subcompact (656 cc) SUV by Honda Motor Company, introduced in 1998 at Honda Primo Japanese dealerships, and discontinued in autumn 2002. It was a two-door version of the Honda Life with the engine installed in the center of the vehicle.

Launched on October 9, 1998, the PA1 Honda Z was manufactured for Honda by Yachiyo Industry Co, a Honda subsidiary manufacturing light trucks. The basic structure of the Z, including its midship-mounted engine placement and 4WD drivetrain was shared with its Honda Acty sibling. Unlike the Acty though, it was a four-seater passenger car which also meant that it had to pass passenger car safety standards. The 656 cc E07Z three-cylinder engine was available in a naturally aspirated as well as in a turbocharged variant.

The Z was only ever available with a four-speed automatic transmission, the same that was used on the EF Honda Civics. The centrally mounted engine was placed in an upright position underneath the rear seat, a layout called "UM-4" (stands for Under Midship 4WD) by Honda. Engine oil changes and minor maintenance work is done through an interior door. As with other mid-engined, four-wheel-drive vehicles, such as the Lamborghini Diablo VT, a viscous center differential was used. Some noteworthy and unusual design features of the Z included the comparatively large-diameter tires, chunky "grip-style" door handles, and the adoption of perspex double-cover headlights.

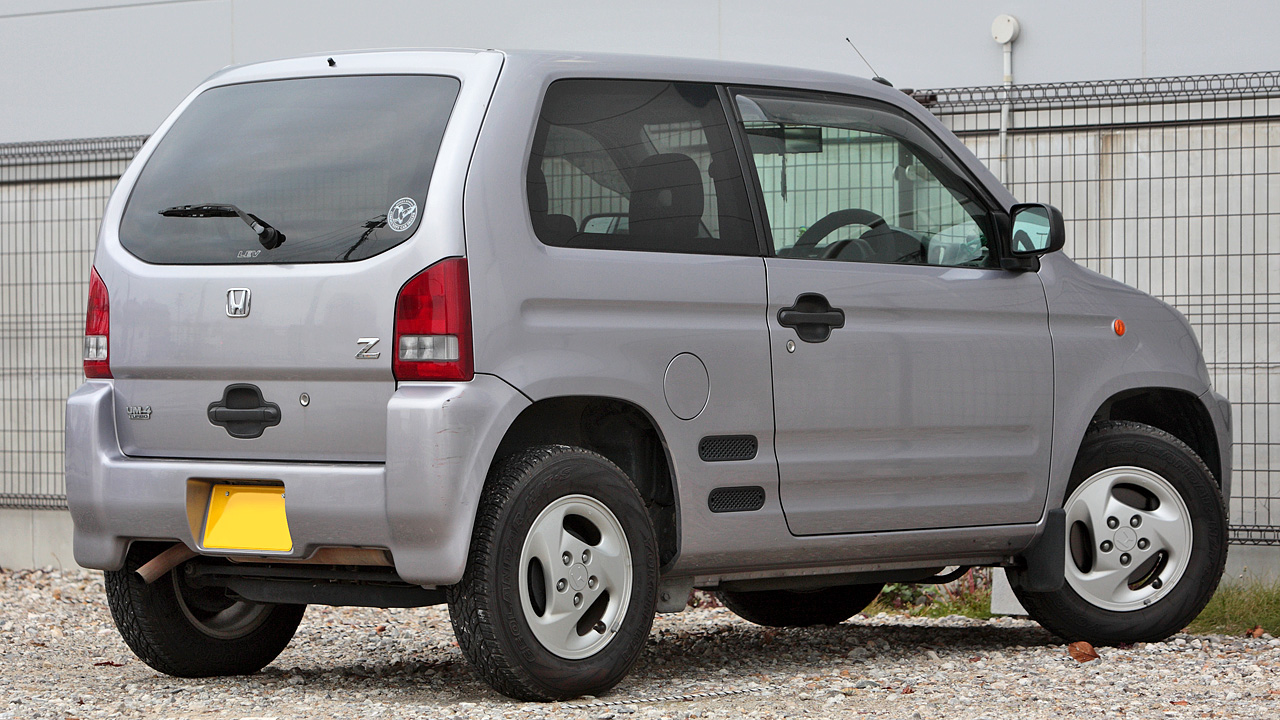
Fully equipped Z Turbo

While the Honda Capa was the first car in the "J-Mover" series, the third generation Life and new Honda Z made up the "K-Mover" series. Famous rock group ZZ Top made the introductory commercial, including a song and video ("ZZ Top on the Z"). Since the car's name has always been pronounced "zed" (ゼット) by Honda, in the British fashion, the Americans in ZZ Top had to follow suit.

In June 2000 a special "Super Emotion" package appeared, with body-colored bumpers, CD player with speakers and tinted glass for a small extra cost. This proved so popular that body-colored bumpers were soon made standard on turbo models. In August 2002, with stricter exhaust emission about to take effect, Honda ended production of the Z. This was to be Honda's first and last SUV Kei-car. Honda also sold a side-mounted step and wheel-arch protector, but these were only for after-market fitment as they made the car too wide for kei regulations and were not crash tested. The naturally aspirated version had 52 PS (38 kW) at 7,000 rpm, while the turbocharged and intercooled version pushed out 64 PS (47 kW) at 6,000 rpm. The engine had four valves per cylinder, Honda's PGM-FI fuel injection system, and were classified as LEVs.

== Land speed record ==
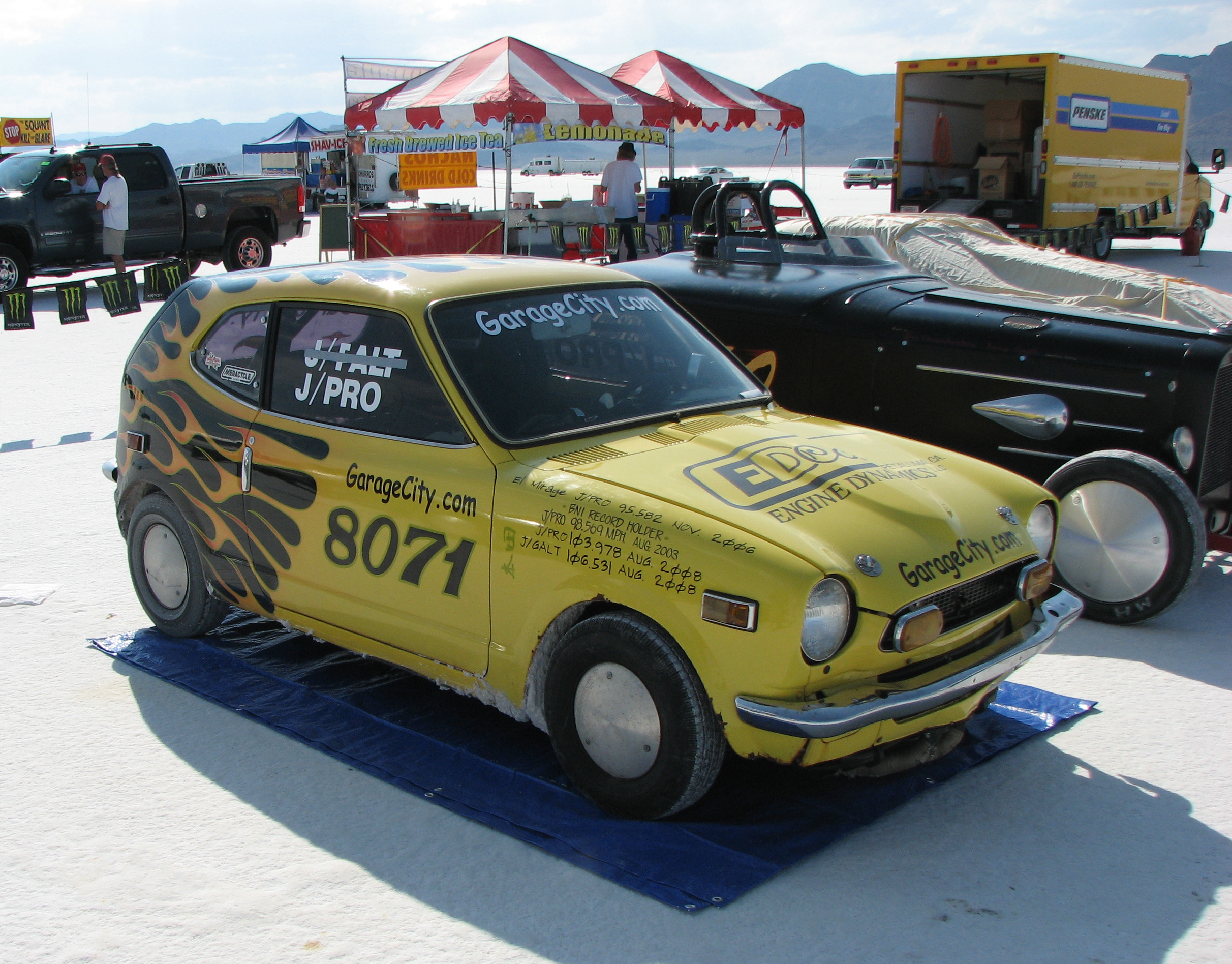
1971 Honda Z600 Evil Tweety at the Bonneville Salt Flats for Speed Week 2009.

On August 19, 2008, a 1971 Z600 coupe named Evil Tweety set a new speed record for stock body production cars with 750 cc (46 cu in) engines at 167.336 km/h (103.978 mph), with a stock 600 engine bored to 700 cc (43 cu in). The record was set by Eric Burns at the Bonneville Salt Flats. The next day Chris Clay took Evil Tweety to a new record for altered gas cars with 750 cc (46 cu in) engines at 171.445 km/h (106.531 mph) These records were beaten three years later, the production car record by a Saab 96.
