= Honda N-WGN =

Kei car produced by Honda

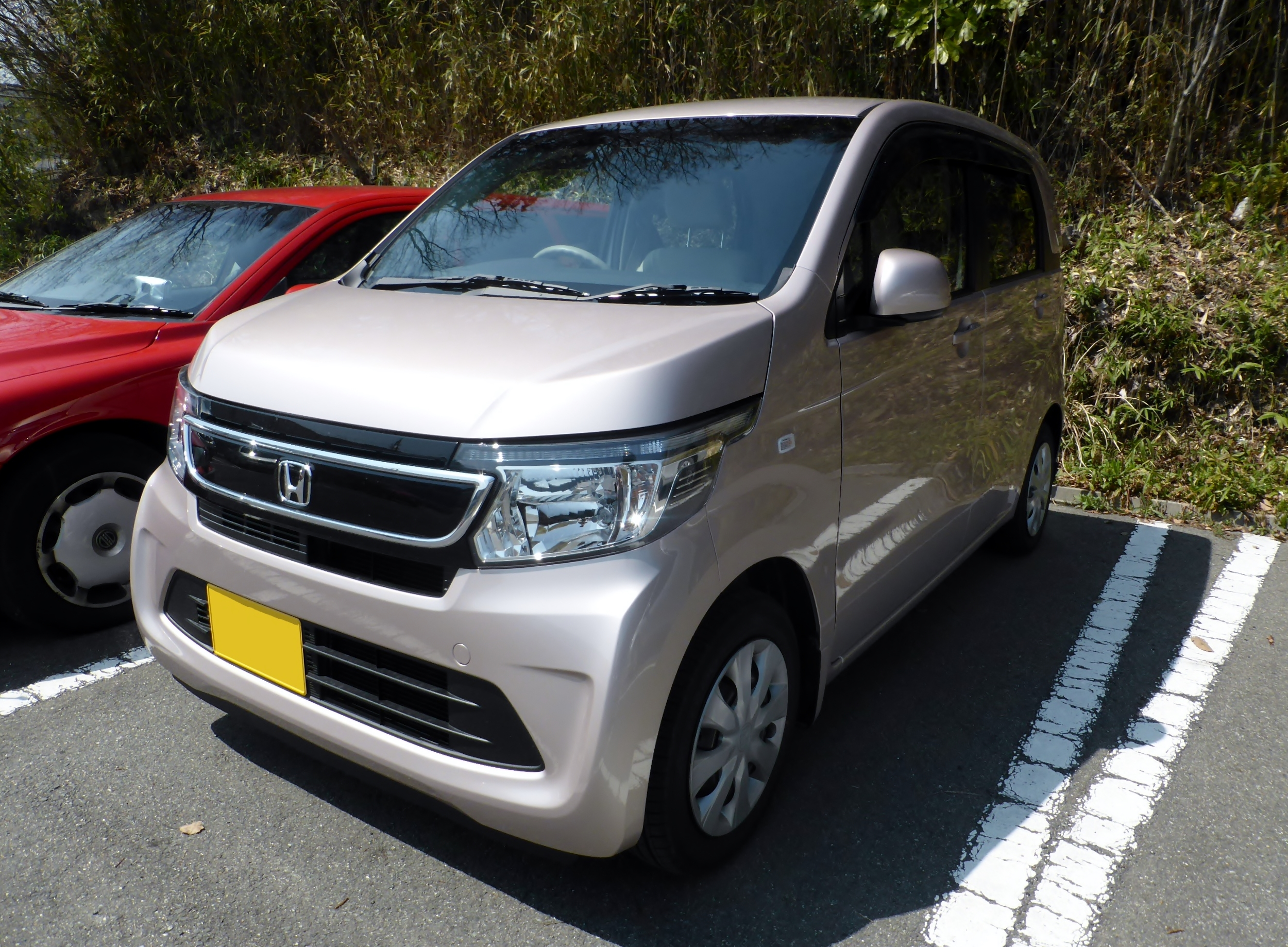
- Honda N-WGN G (JH1)

Overview
- Manufacturer: Honda
- Production: November 2013 – present
- Assembly: Japan: Suzuka, Mie (Suzuka plant)

Body and chassis
- Class: Kei car
- Body style: 5-door hatchback
- Related: Honda N-One; Honda N-Box; Honda N-Van

Chronology
- Predecessor: Honda Life; Honda Zest

The Honda N-WGN (Japanese: ホンダ・N-WGN, Hepburn: Honda Enuwagon) is a kei car produced by Honda since 2013 over two generations. A Japanese market model, the N-WGN is a five-door hatchback with a front-mounted engine and either front-wheel drive or four-wheel drive. Together with the N-Box, N-One and N-Van, is part of the renewed N lineup of kei class city cars from Honda. The "N" prefix was previously used for the late 1960s and 1970s N360; originally it stood for norimono which loosely translates to vehicle. For the new N lineup, the "N" represented New, Next, Nippon, and Norimono.

== First generation (JH1/2; 2013) ==
First generation
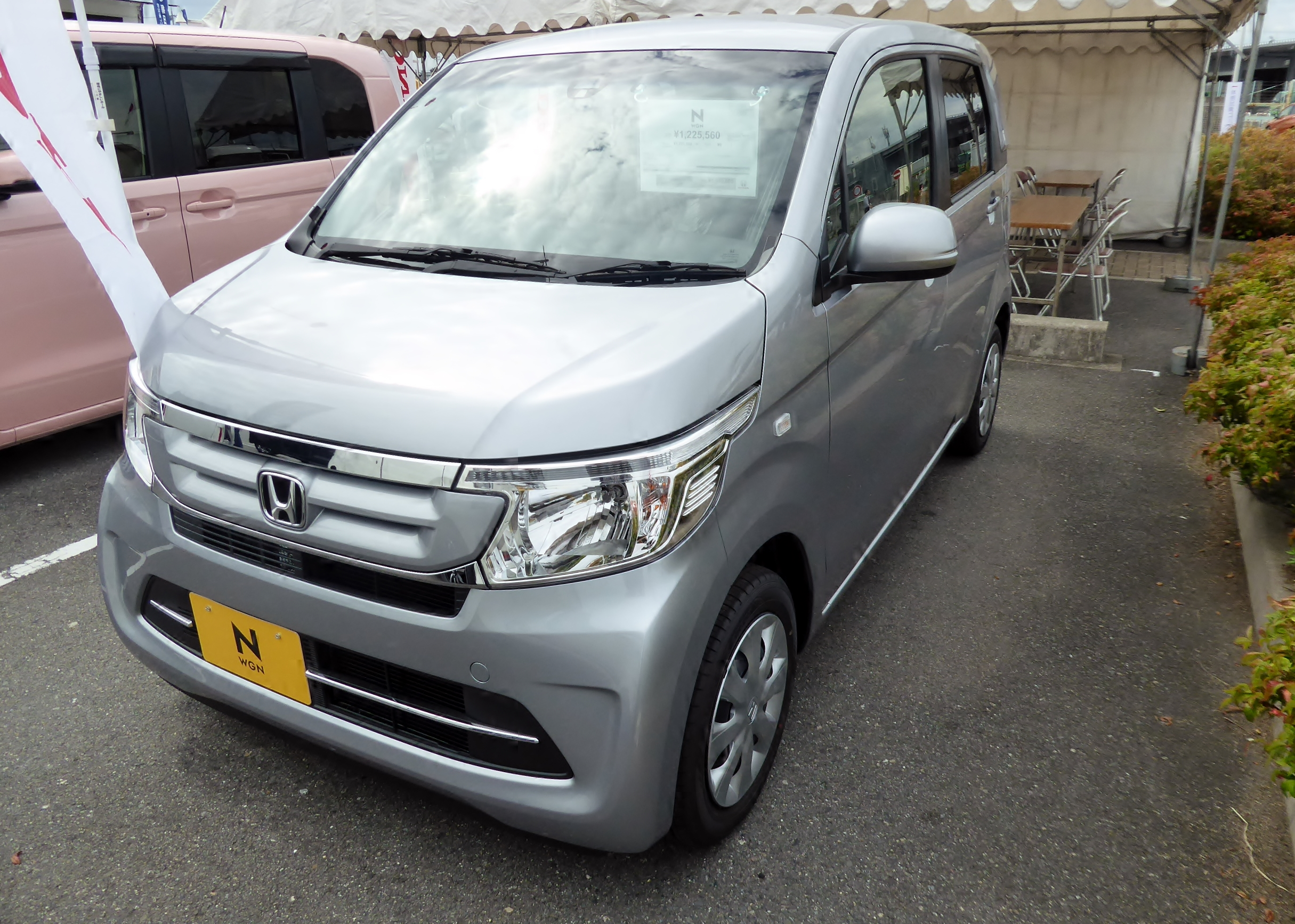
- Honda N-WGN G (JH1; 2016 facelift)

Overview
- Model code: JH1/2
- Production: November 2013 – July 2019

Body and chassis
- Layout: Front-engine, front-wheel-drive (JH1); Front-engine, four-wheel-drive (JH2)

Powertrain
- Engine: 658 cc S07A I3; 658 cc S07A Turbo turbo I3
- Power output: 43 kW (58 PS) (S07A); 47 kW (64 PS) (S07A Turbo)
- Transmission: CVT

Dimensions
- Wheelbase: 2,520 mm (99.2 in)
- Length: 3,395 mm (133.7 in)
- Width: 1,475 mm (58.1 in)
- Height: 1,655 mm (65.2 in) (FWD); 1,675 mm (65.9 in) (4WD)
- Kerb weight: 820–920 kg (1,808–2,028 lb)

The N-WGN was first announced on 26 September 2013. The teasers of the car were revealed on 21 October 2013. The car went on sale on 22 November 2013. An innovative feature was the sliding rear seat, which could be moved 200 mm (7.9 in) longitudinally, allowing users to choose whether to allocate more space for luggage or passengers. Both engines feature idling-stop.

The initial range consisted of the standard N-WGN G model, also available with the better equipped Anshin Package or the Turbo Package or. The sportier N-WGN Custom lineup mirrored the regular line. Later, the Anshin Package was replaced by the G-L Package, joined by the Stylish Package. In July 2015, a decontented, lower-priced variant called the N-WGN C was introduced, only available in three colours. In July 2016, the N-WGN was facelifted and given a more traditional, body-coloured grille with two horizontal bars. The N-WGN Custom also received a new grille with two bars, as well as an additional chrome strip along the top.

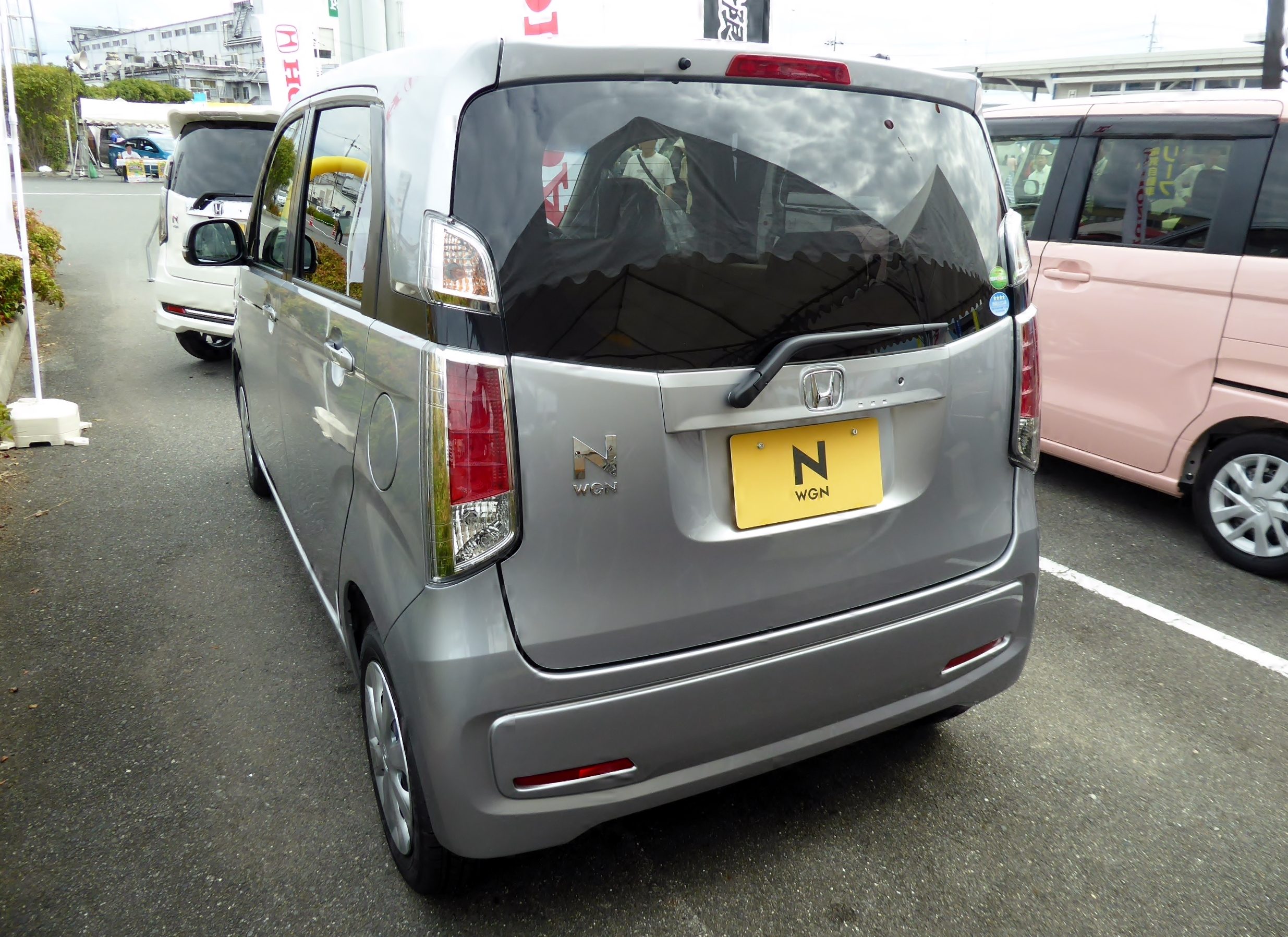
Rear view (facelift)

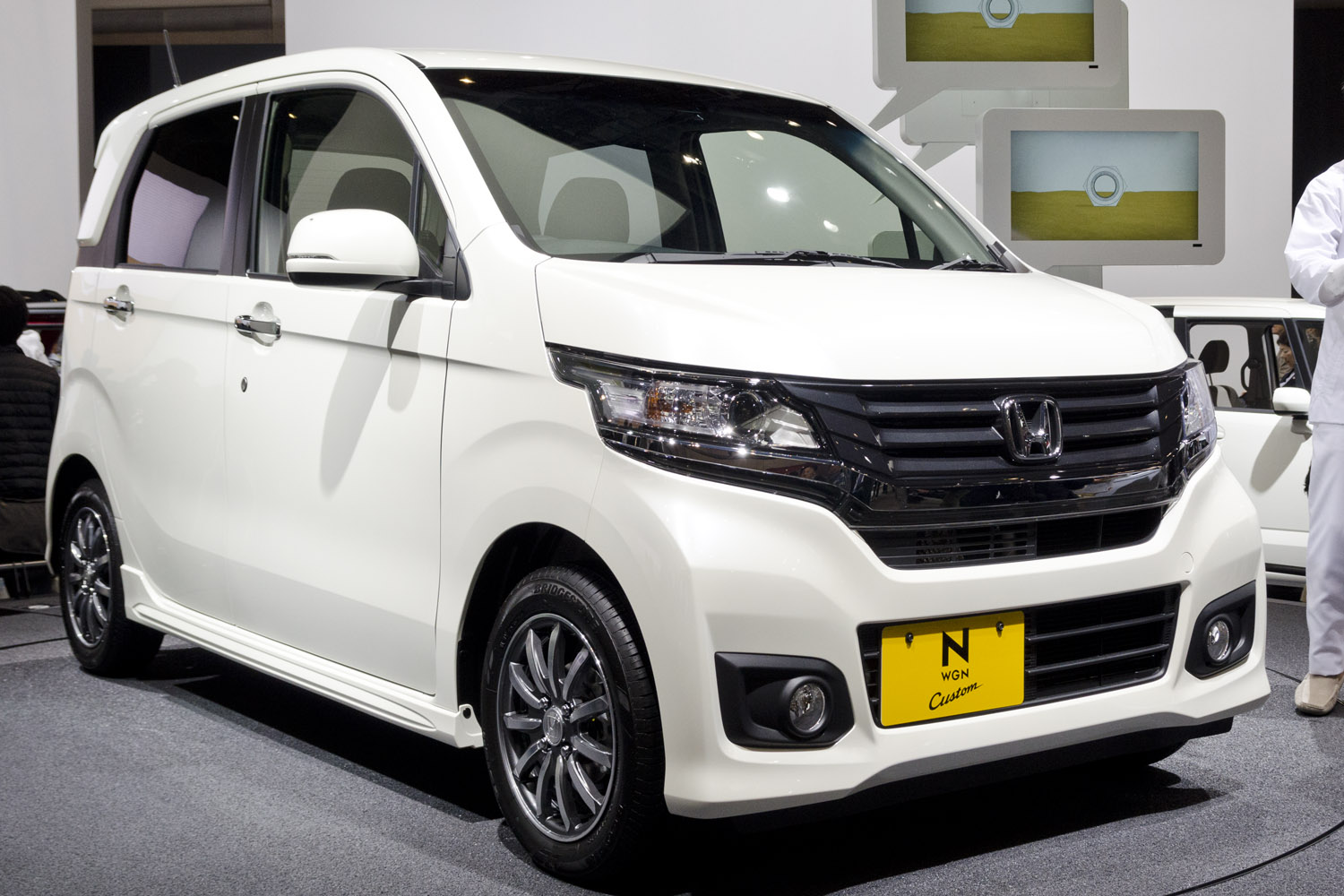
Honda N-WGN Custom (pre-facelift)

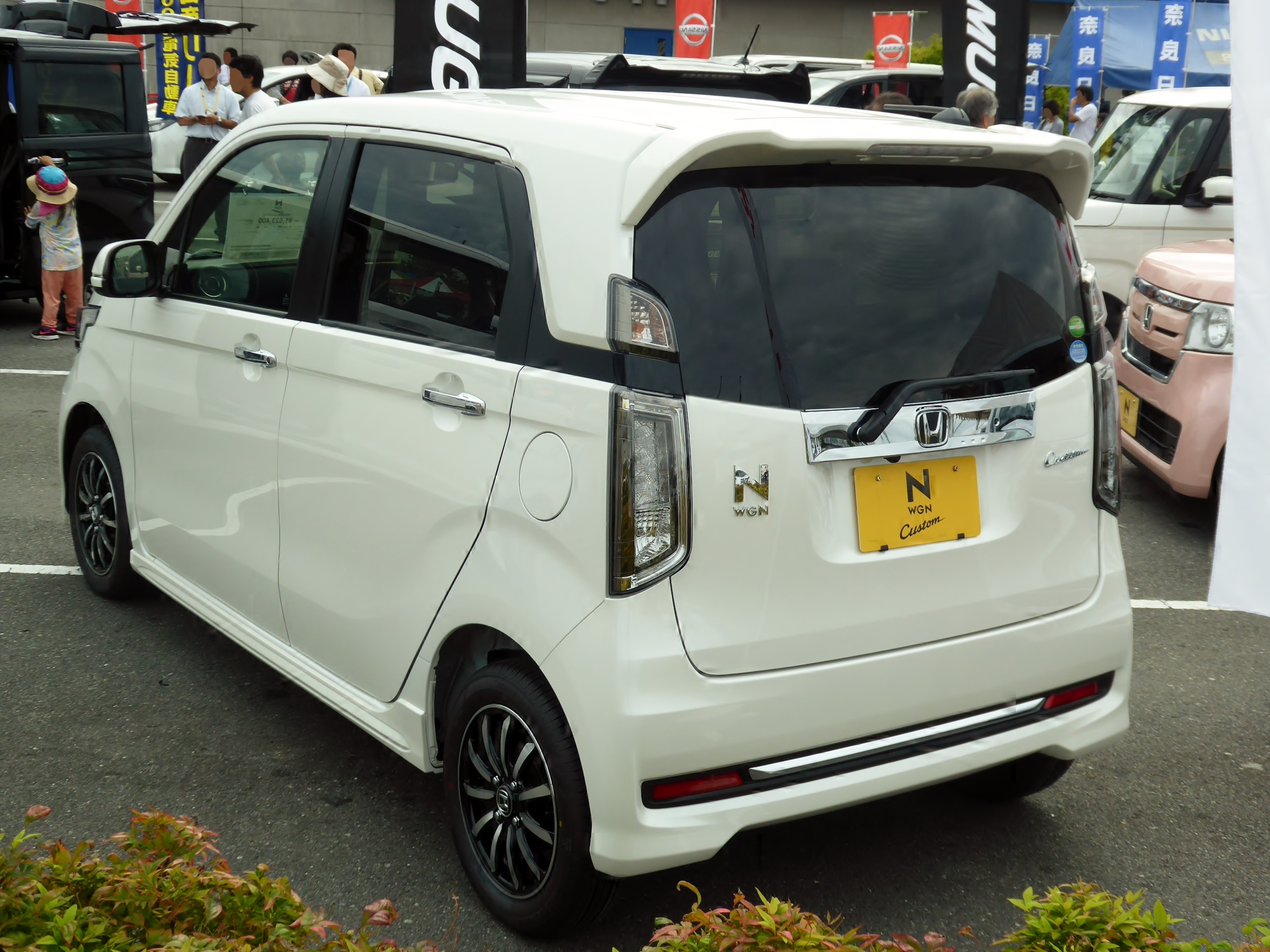
Honda N-WGN Custom rear view

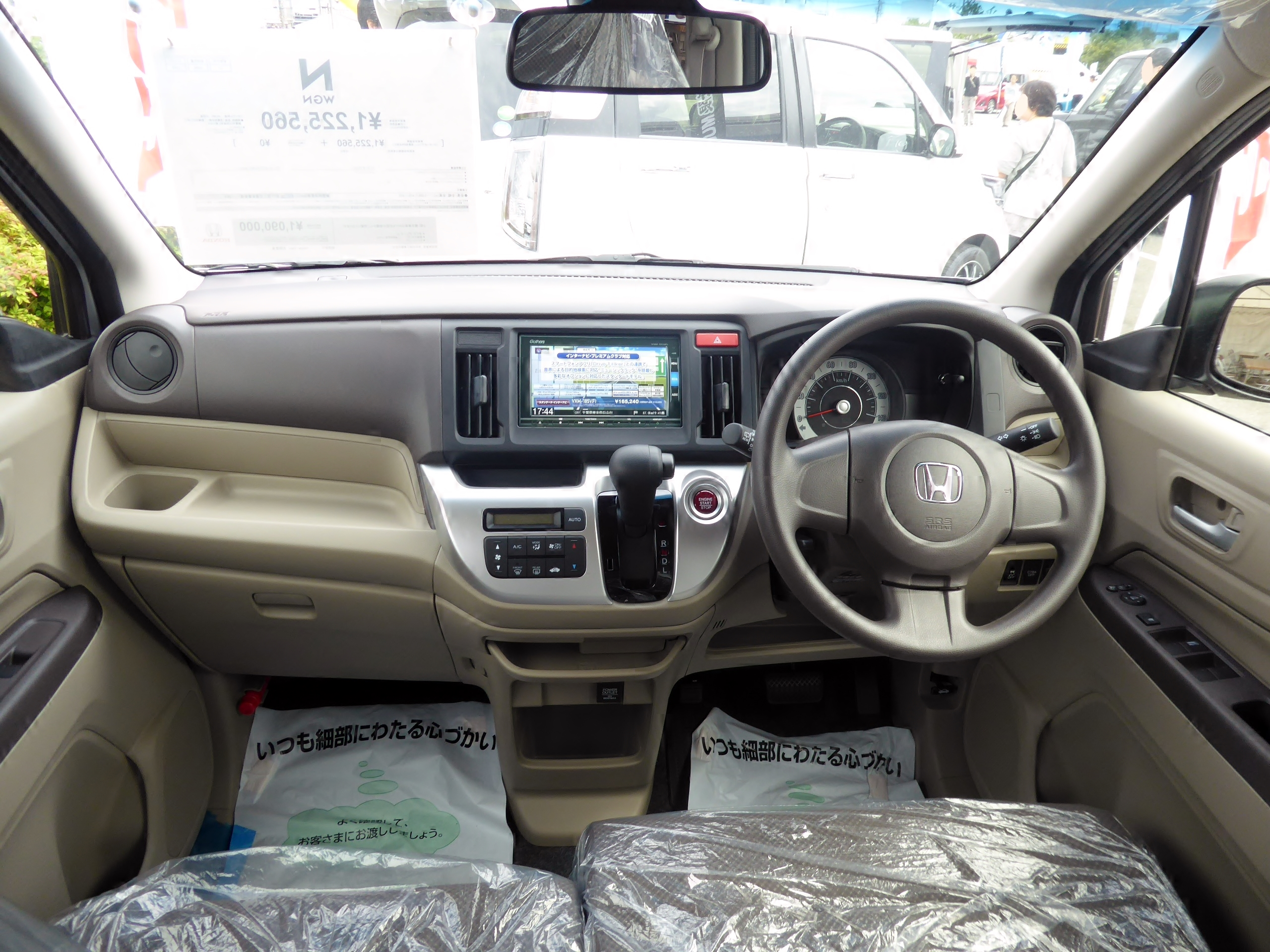
Interior

== Second generation (JH3/4; 2019) ==
Second generation
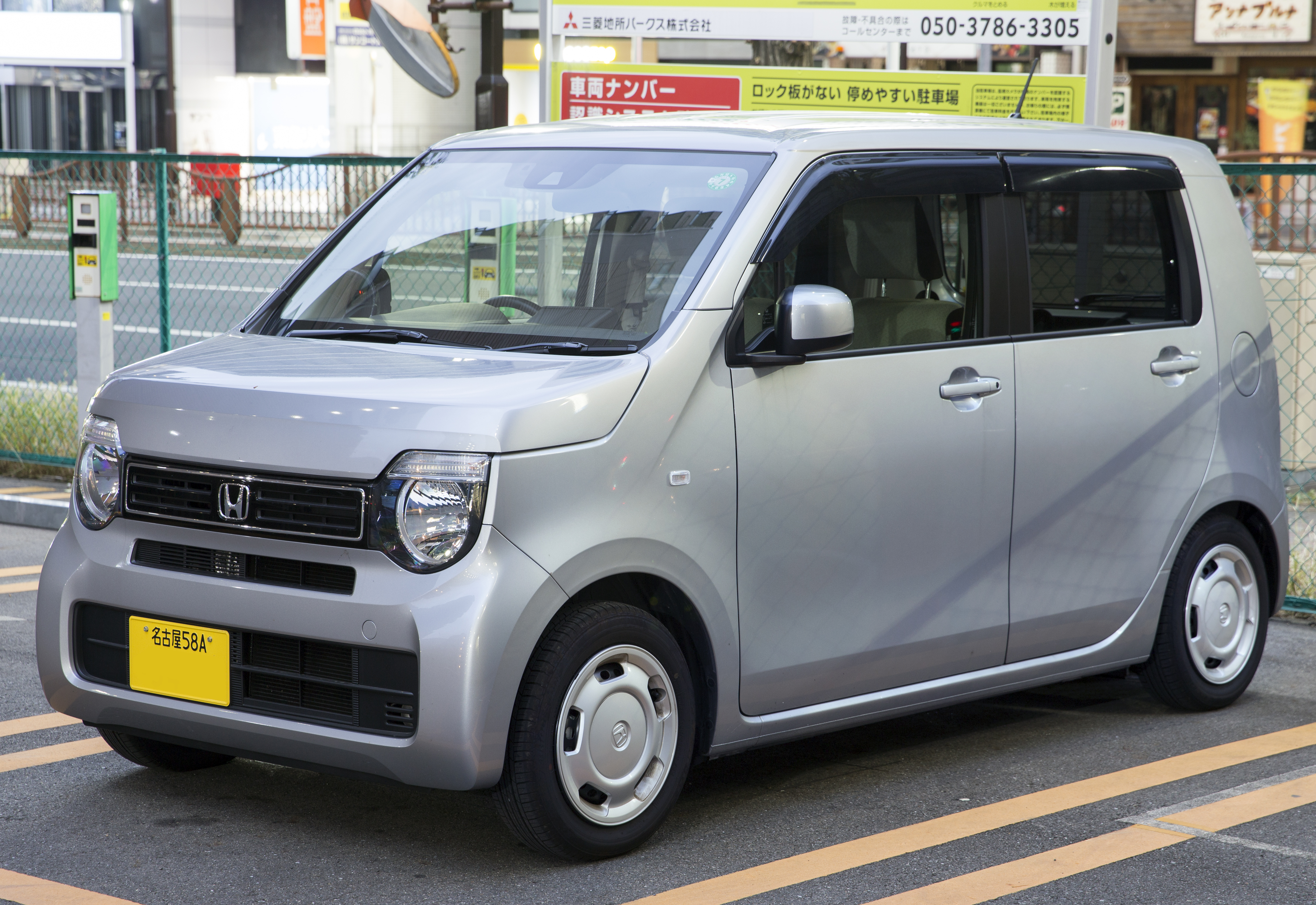
- Honda N-WGN (JH3)

Overview
- Model code: JH3/4
- Production: August 2019 – present

Body and chassis
- Layout: Front-engine, front-wheel-drive (JH3); Front-engine, four-wheel-drive (JH4)

Powertrain
- Engine: 658 cc S07B I3; 658 cc S07B turbo I3
- Power output: 43 kW (58 PS) (S07B); 47 kW (64 PS) (S07B Turbo)
- Transmission: CVT

Dimensions
- Wheelbase: 2,520 mm (99.2 in)
- Length: 3,395 mm (133.7 in)
- Width: 1,475 mm (58.1 in)
- Height: 1,675–1,725 mm (65.9–67.9 in)
- Kerb weight: 850–930 kg (1,874–2,050 lb)

The second-generation N-WGN was unveiled on 18 July 2019 and went on sale on 9 August 2019. It is also available in a version with a rotating seat, specifically for handicapped drivers.

A facelifted model went on sale on 22 September 2022. This marked the end of the turbocharged engine option for the regular N-WGN; this is now restricted to the N-WGN Custom model. External differences were limited to the Custom model, which received a new grille with a honeycomb element, and a new alloy wheel design. The two-tone color scheme which had been available on the N-WGN L was discontinued, while the side marker lights on the L were moved from the fenders into the rear view mirrors.

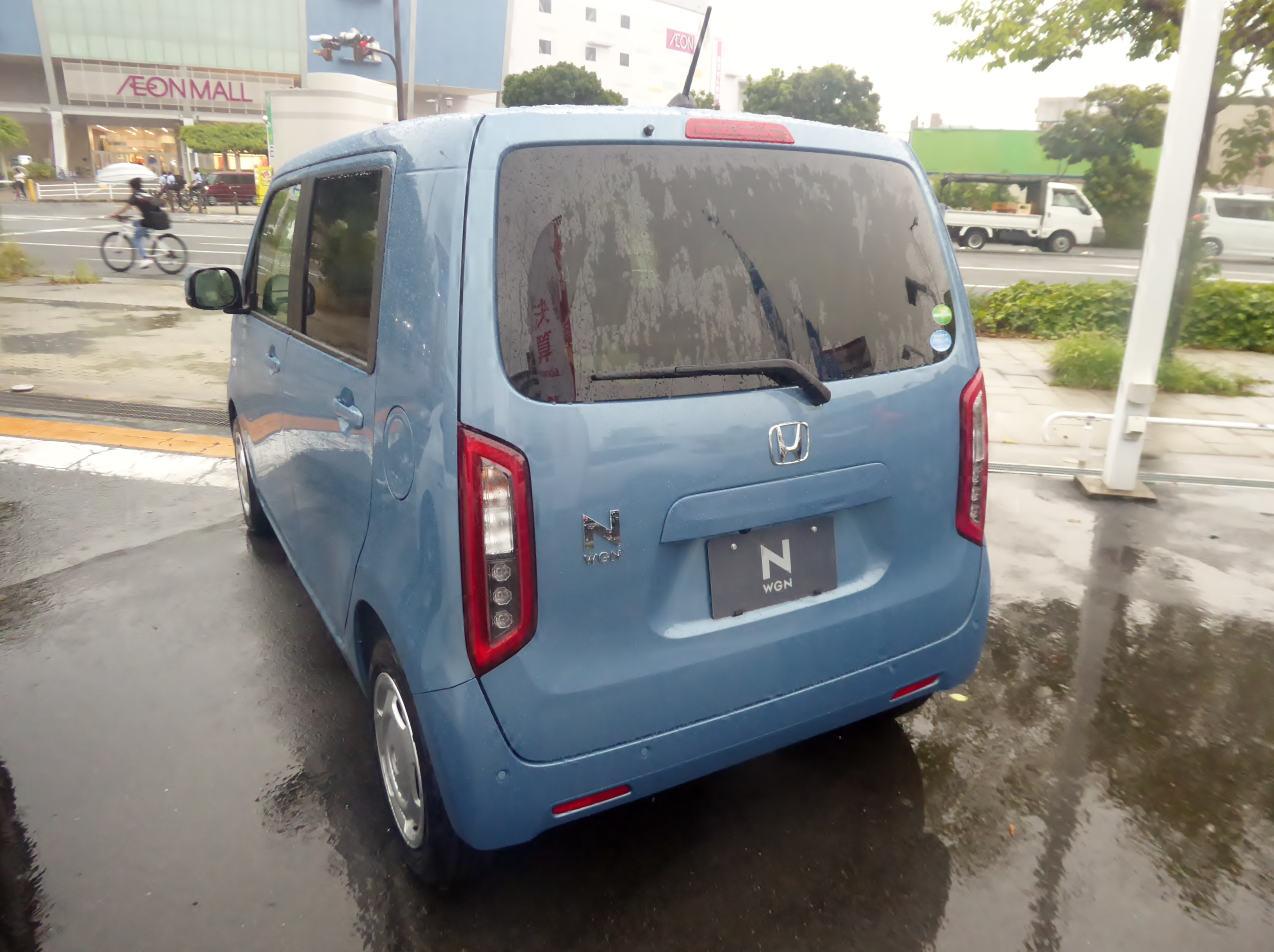
Rear view

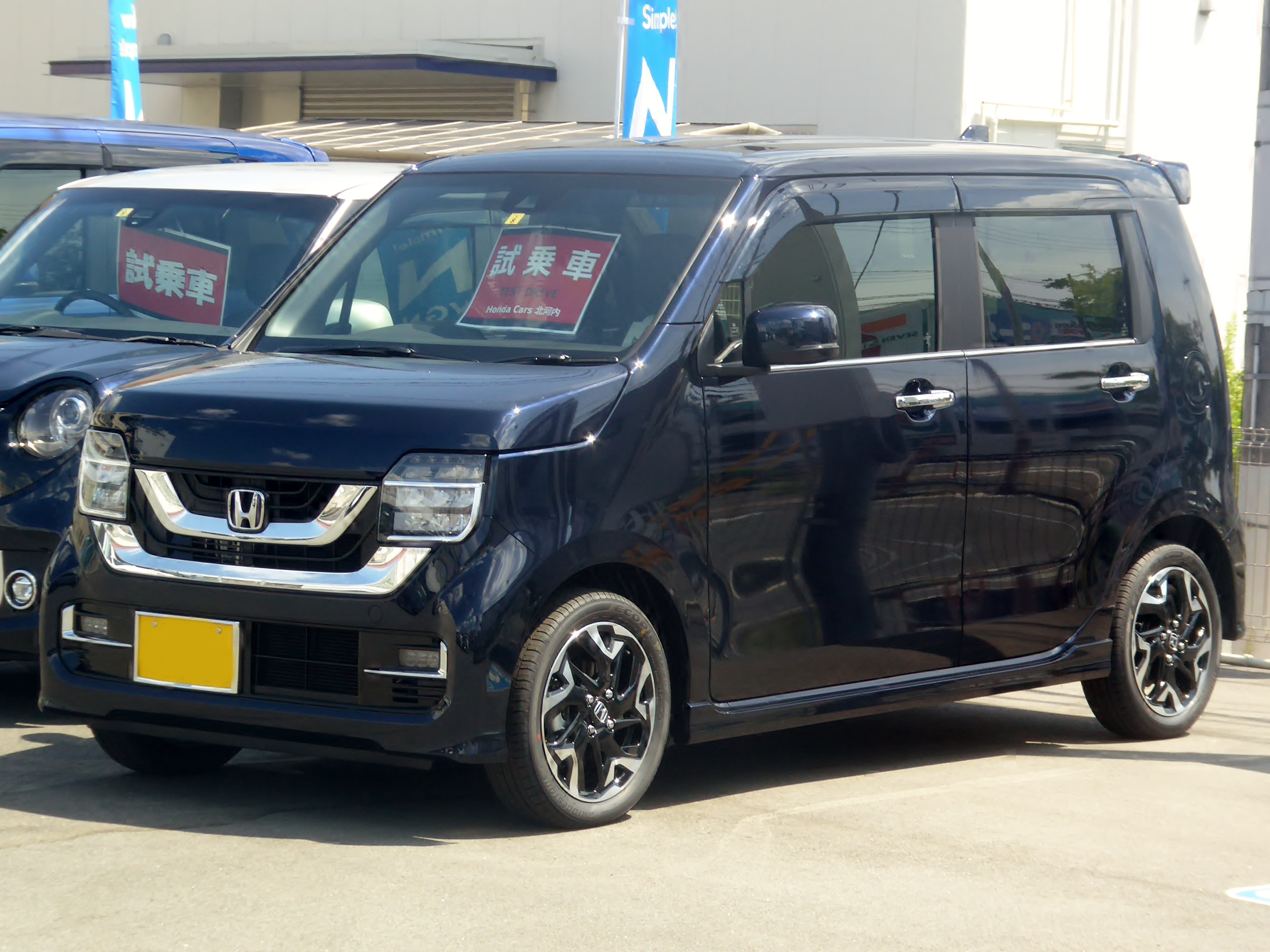
Honda N-WGN Custom (pre-facelift)

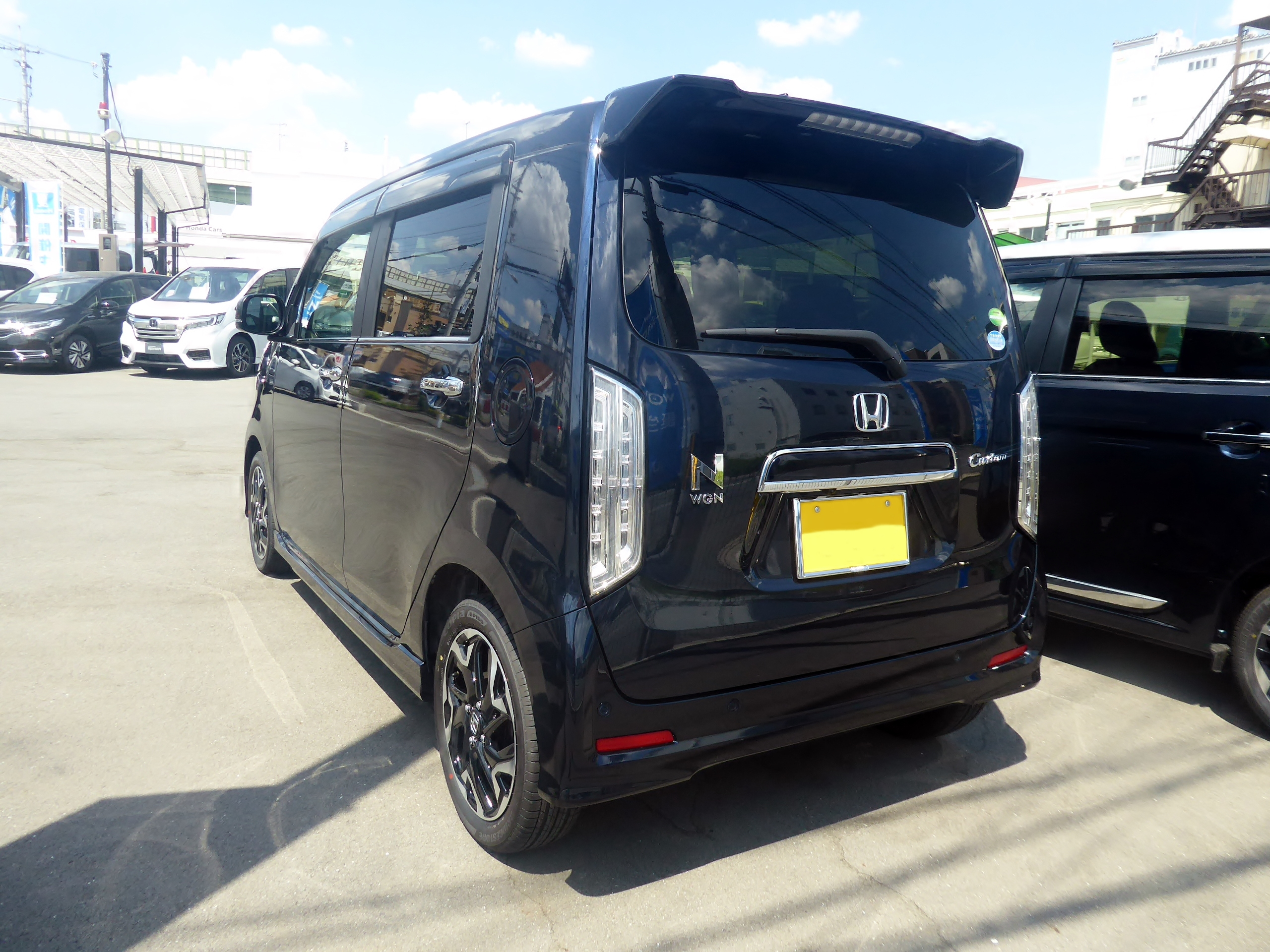
Honda N-WGN Custom rear view

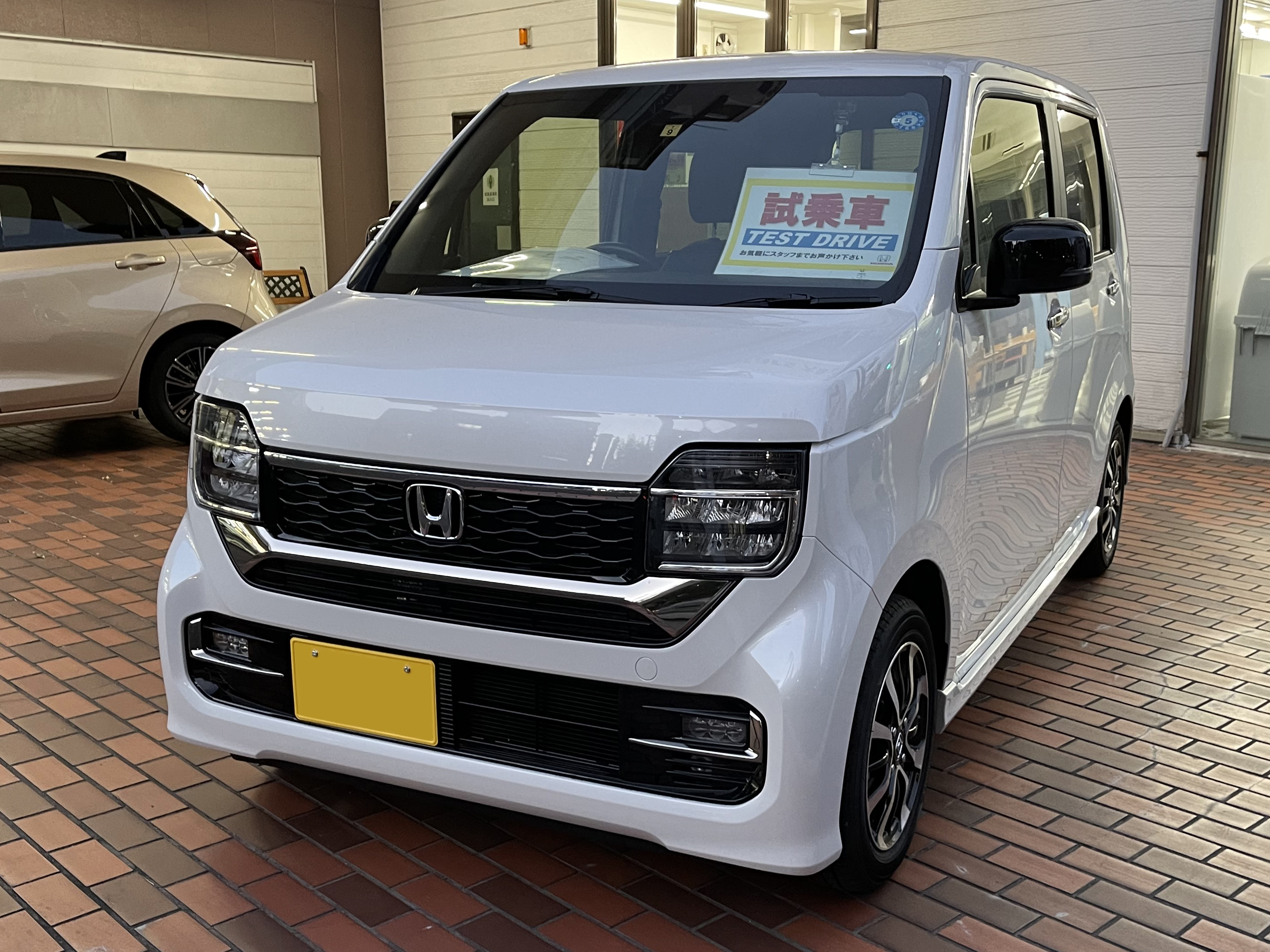
Honda N-WGN Custom (facelift)

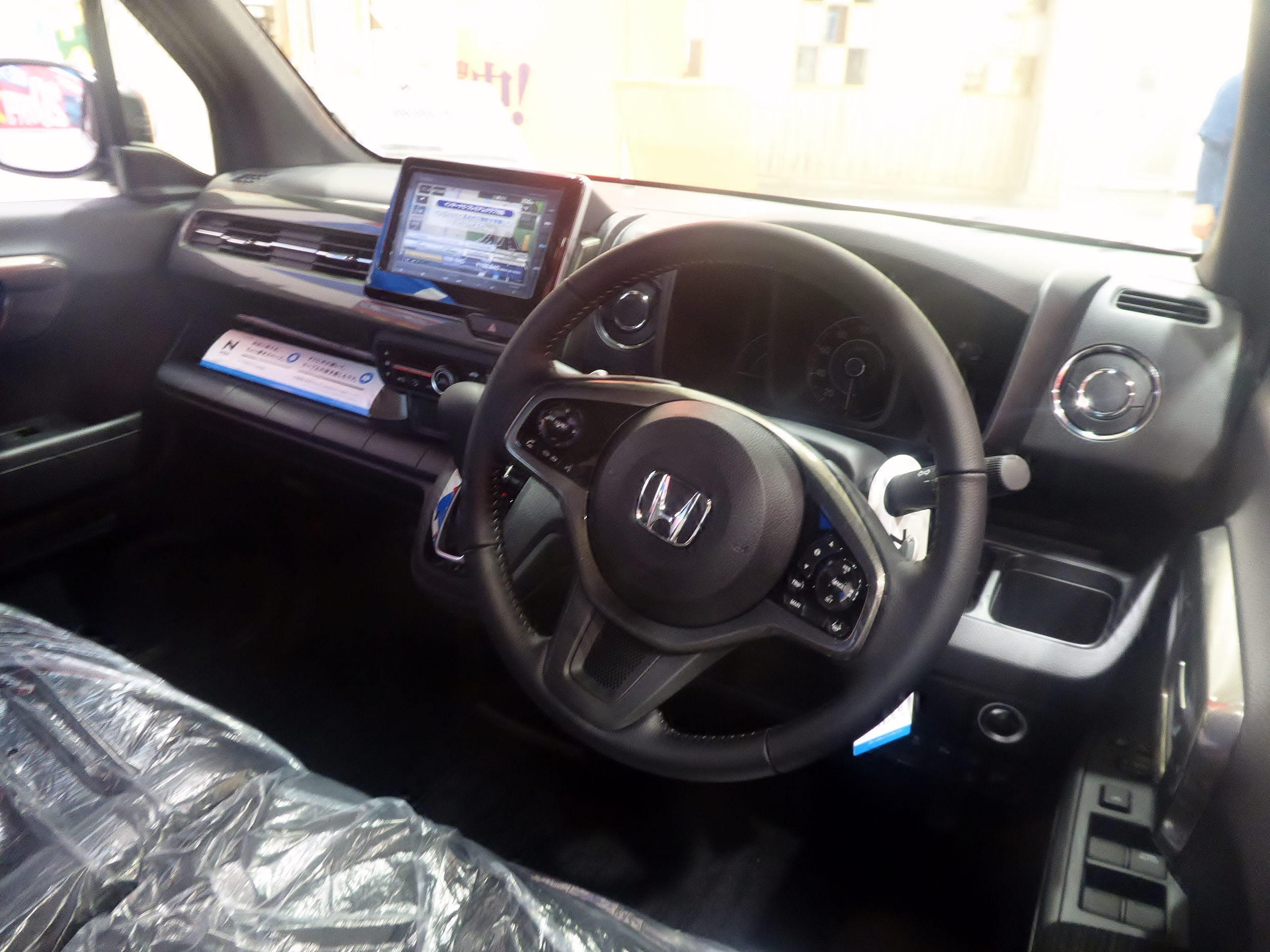
Interior

== Sales ==
Year	Japan
2013	11,510
2014	146,717
2015	96,038
2016	86,707
2017	75,591
2018	63,009
2019	32,382
2020	69,353
2021	50,728
2022	42,330
2023	37,779
2024	33,537
