= Honda E0 engine =

Small Japanese gasoline engines

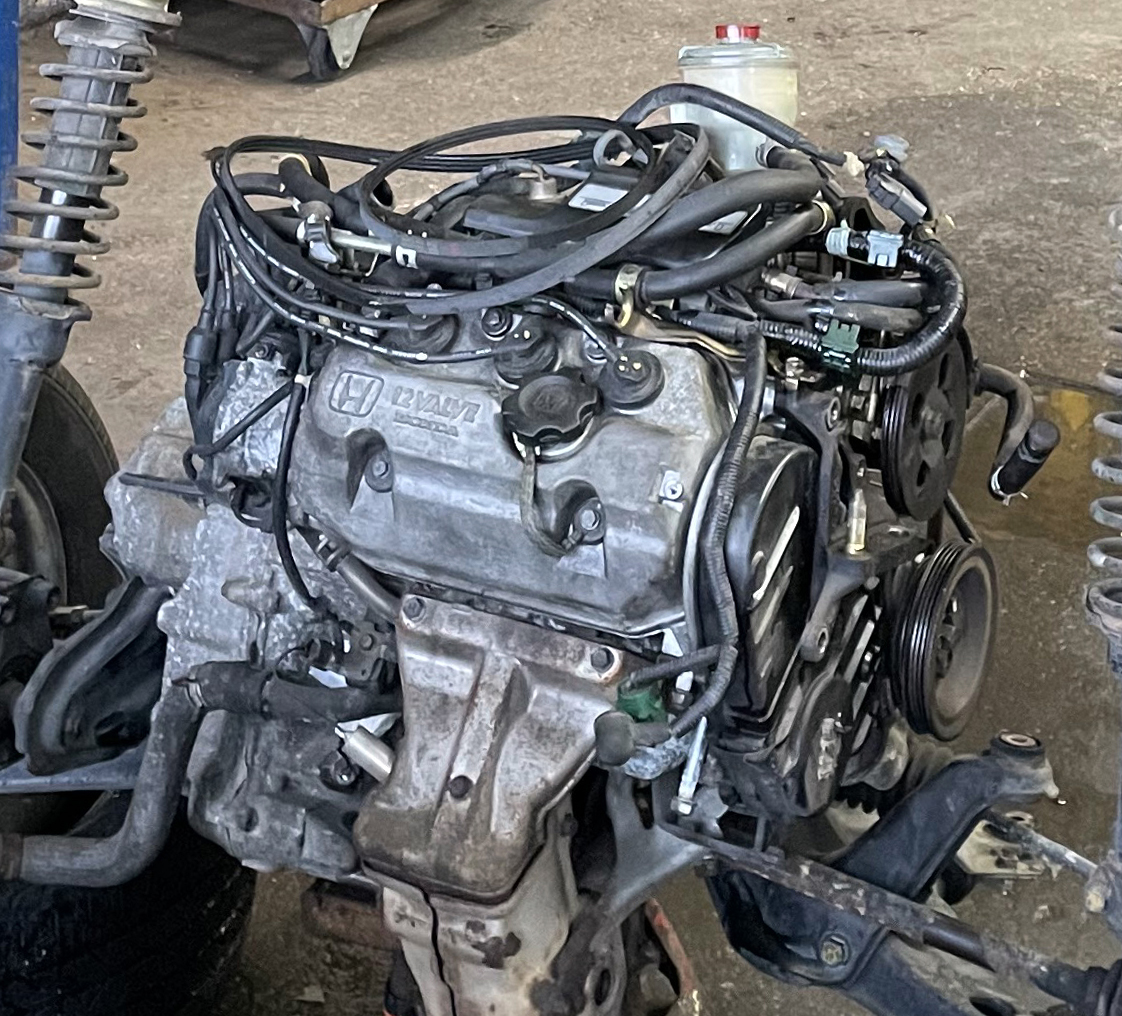
E07A engine (PGM-FI) from a JA4 Honda Today

The E0 series is a three-cylinder gasoline engine developed and manufactured by Honda, with a total displacement of 656 cc. The engine is intended for kei car applications. The E05A and E07A were partially replaced by the Honda P engine but as of 2020 the E07Z engine still saw use in the Acty truck.

The E0 is based on the Honda EH Engine, a SOHC 2-cylinder engine. Like the Honda D engine, it rotates anti-clockwise from the timing belt side. The engine was available with either a computer-controlled variable venturi-type side draft carburetor (PGM-CARB) or a multi-point fuel-injected (PGM-FI) version.

Utilizing a cross-flow design, the intake and exhaust valves are opened and closed by the rocker arm driven by a camshaft timing belt. The two intake and two exhaust valves are positioned on either side of the spark plug which is mounted on the top center of the combustion chamber. The cylinder block and cylinder bore are made of die-cast aluminum, as are the valve covers and oil pan. Early Japanese emissions requirements for passenger automobiles required that exhaust gas purification be accomplished by means of a three-way catalyst. The requirement was later amended to include commercial vehicles as well.

== E05A ==
=== CARBURETED ===
- SOHC 12 valve CV carburetor
- Displacement: 547 cc
- Bore & stroke: 62.5 mm × 59.5 mm
- Compression ratio: 9.8:1
- Power: 26 kW (35 hp; 35 PS) / 6,500 rpm
- Torque: 4.5 kg⋅m (33 lb⋅ft; 44 N⋅m) / 5,200 rpm
- Applications:
  - 1988–1990 Honda Today
  - 1988–1990 Honda Acty

== E07A Basic specifications ==
- Water-cooled 3-cylinder
- Gasoline Fuel
- 656 cc (40.0 cu in) total displacement
- 2 belt drive mechanism of the intake and exhaust valve SOHC 2
- Bore & stroke: 66.0 mm × 64.0 mm
- There were three versions of fuel supply systems for this motor: Carburetor (PGM-CARB), fuel injection (PGM-FI) and MTREC (Multi Throttle Responsive Engine Control). The MTREC version of this engine has the highest power output of the various configurations.

=== E07A (PGM-CARB) ===
- SOHC 12 Valve CV carburetor
- Displacement: 656 cc
- Bore & stroke: 66.0 mm × 64.0 mm
- Power: 31 kW (42 PS; 41 hp) / 6,000 rpm
- Torque: 5.4 kg⋅m (53 N⋅m; 39 lb⋅ft) / 5,000 rpm
- Applications:
  - JA2/JA3 Honda Today
  - JW3/JW4 Honda Today

=== E07A (PGM-FI) ===
The fuel injected version was standard fitment to the second generation Honda Today (JA4/JA5), which was only available as a passenger car version. The previous generation Today remained on sale and offered a fuel injected engine in some models (XTi, QXi). These earlier versions were tuned for more top-end power than the ones installed in the more comfort-oriented JA4 models.

- SOHC 12 Valve PGM-FI
- Displacement: 656 cc
- Bore & stroke: 66.0 mm × 64.0 mm
- Power: 38 kW (52 PS; 51 hp) / 7,500 rpm (early)

35 kW (48 PS; 47 hp) / 6,300 rpm (late)

- Torque: 5.6 kg⋅m (55 N⋅m; 41 lb⋅ft) / 4,500 rpm (early)

5.8 kg⋅m (57 N⋅m; 42 lb⋅ft) / 5,500 rpm (late)

- Applications:
  - JA2/JA3 Honda Today (first generation)
  - JA4/JA5 Honda Today (second generation)

=== E07A (MTREC) ===
In order to extract higher power from a naturally aspirated engine, Honda modified the E07A with a MTREC (Multi Throttle Responsive Engine Control) system, placing individual throttle-bodies on each of the three cylinders.

The system modified the air-fuel ratio of individual cylinders based on rpm to give sharper throttle response while also maintaining a stable idle. When fitted to the Today, the engine was tuned for somewhat less peak power in favor of more low-down torque.

- SOHC 12 valve MTREC
- Displacement: 656 cc
- Bore & stroke: 66.0 mm × 64.0 mm
- Power: 43 kW (58 PS; 57 hp) / 7,300 rpm (Today)

47 kW (64 PS; 63 hp) / 8,100 rpm (Beat)

- Torque: 6.1 kg⋅m (60 N⋅m; 44 lb⋅ft) / 6,200 rpm (Today)

6.1 kg⋅m (60 N⋅m; 44 lb⋅ft) / 7,000 rpm (Beat)

- Applications:
  - PP1 Honda Beat
  - JA4 Honda Today

== E07Z ==
=== E07Z ===
- PGM-FI SOHC 12 Valve
- Displacement: 656 cc
- Bore & stroke: 66.0 mm × 64.0 mm
- Power: 33 kW (45 PS; 44 hp) / 5,500 rpm (Acty truck)

38 kW (52 PS; 51 hp) / 7,000 rpm (Life, Vamos)

- Torque: 59 N⋅m (6.0 kg⋅m; 43 lb⋅ft) / 6,200 rpm (Acty truck)

62 N⋅m (6.3 kg⋅m; 46 lb⋅ft) / 4,000 rpm (Life, Vamos)

- Applications:
  - Honda Acty truck (HA6 / 7)
  - Honda Acty van (HH5 / 6)
  - Honda Vamos / Honda Vamos Hobio (HM1 / 2)
  - Honda Vamos Hobio (commercial grade HJ1 / 2)
  - Honda Life (JB1 / 2)
  - Honda Z (PA1)
  - Honda That's (JD1/2)

=== E07Z (turbo version) ===
- PGM-FI SOHC 12 valve turbo
- Displacement: 656 cc
- Bore & stroke: 66.0 mm × 64.0 mm
- Power: 47 kW (64 PS; 63 hp) / 6,000 rpm
- Torque: 9.5 kg⋅m (69 lb⋅ft; 93 N⋅m) / 3,700 rpm (HM1 Vamos)
- Applications:
  - Honda Vamos / Vamos Hobio (HM1 / 2)
  - Honda Life Dunk (JB3 / 4)
  - Honda Z (PA1)
  - Honda That's (JD1/2)

== ECA1 ==
The ECA1 engine was used in the first-generation Honda Insight, as part of the car's Integrated Motor Assist gasoline-electric hybrid drive system. A three-cylinder engine, it displaces 995 cc and features a SOHC 12-valve head. The engine is supplemented in various circumstances by a 10 kW permanent magnet DC electric motor adding 9.7 kW (13.0 hp; 13.2 PS) and 2.2 kg⋅m (16 lb⋅ft; 22 N⋅m) torque throughout the entire RPM range.

- SOHC 12 valve VTEC PGM-FI
- Displacement: 995 cc
- Bore & stroke: 72.0 mm × 81.5 mm
- Compression ratio: 10.8:1
- Power: 50 kW (67 hp; 68 PS) / 54 kW (72 hp; 73 PS) (with IMA) at 5,700 rpm
- Torque: 9.4 kg⋅m (68 lb⋅ft; 92 N⋅m) / 4,800 rpm & 12.6 kg⋅m (91 lb⋅ft; 124 N⋅m) / 2000 rpm (with IMA) (ZE1 Honda Insight)
- Applications:
  - 2000-2006 Honda Insight
