= Honda Zest =

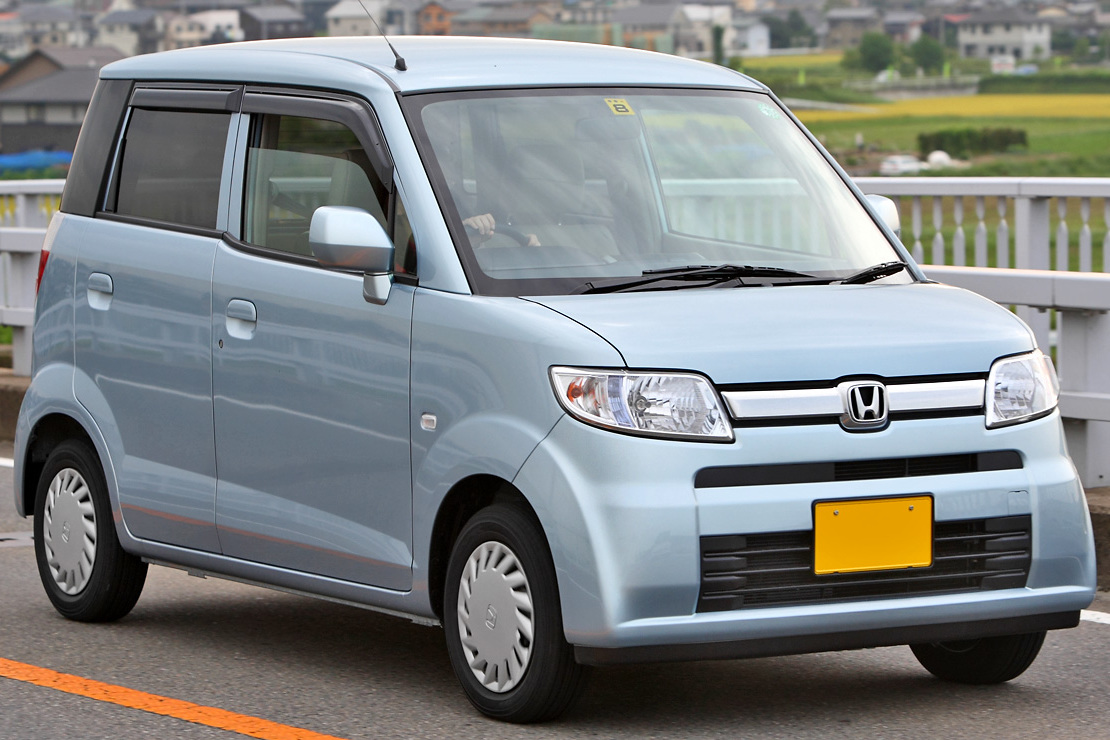

Overview
- Manufacturer: Honda
- Production: 2006-2012

Body and chassis
- Class: Kei car
- Body style: 5-door hatchback
- Related: Honda Life fifth generation

Powertrain
- Engine: 659 cc P07A I3

Chronology
- Predecessor: Honda That's; Honda Life Dunk
- Successor: Honda N-One; Honda N-WGN

The Honda Zest is a kei car released in 2006 by Honda. It is mechanically identical to the fifth-generation Honda Life. Equipped with a turbocharged engine, 3 cylinders, and 4 doors, it was the first kei car available with optional side curtain airbags. It was available in two distinct versions — Zest and Zest Sports. During the fall/winter 2008, the Zest Sports was replaced with the Zest Spark. Honda enlisted J-Pop mega-star Ayumi Hamasaki ("Ayu") to promote the Zest Spark with a special (dealer installed) "A Style Package" edition. The Ayu x Zest Spark collaboration replaced the "A" in the Spark logo with Ayu's stylized "A" and also included a dashboard garnish and a revised front grille.

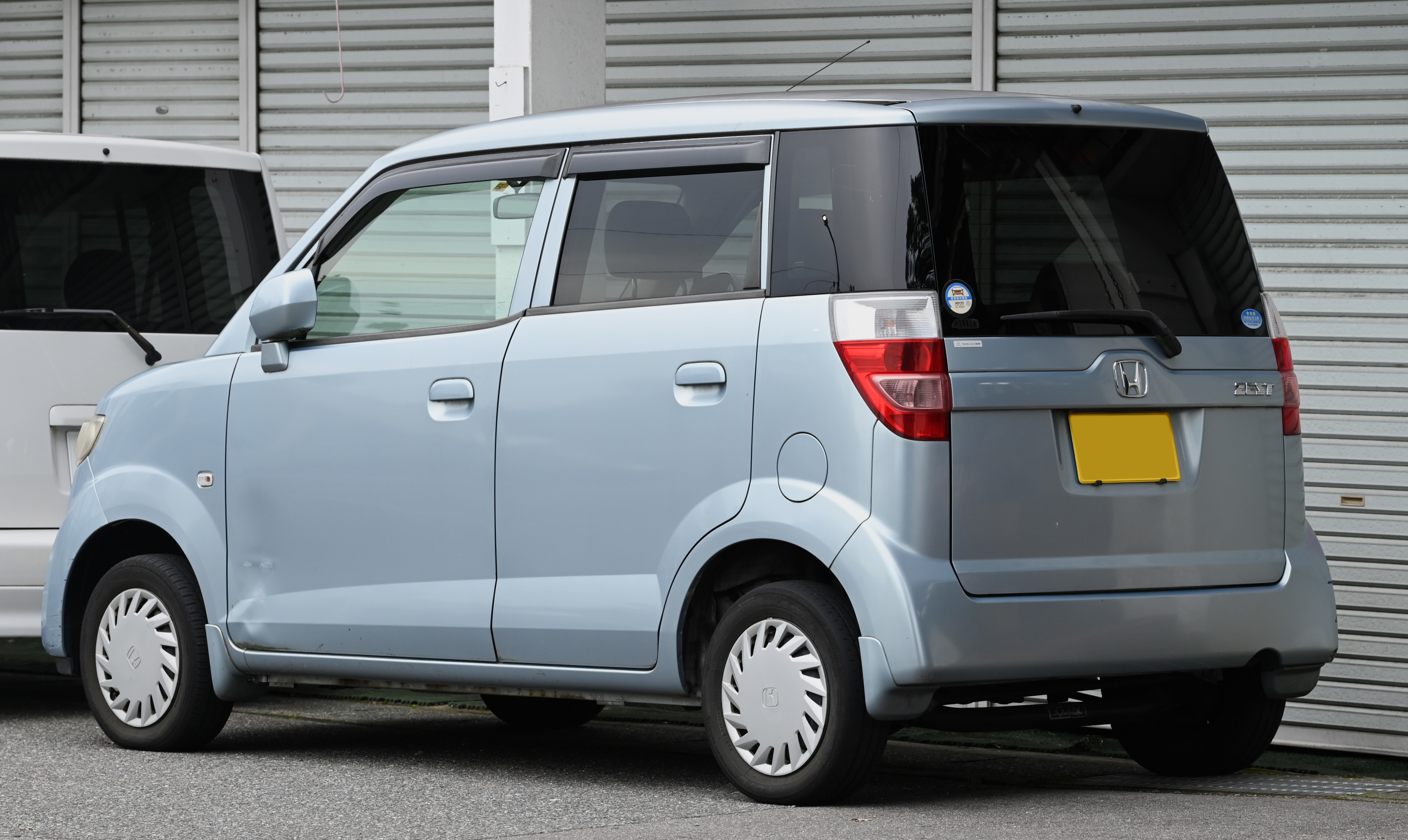
Rear view

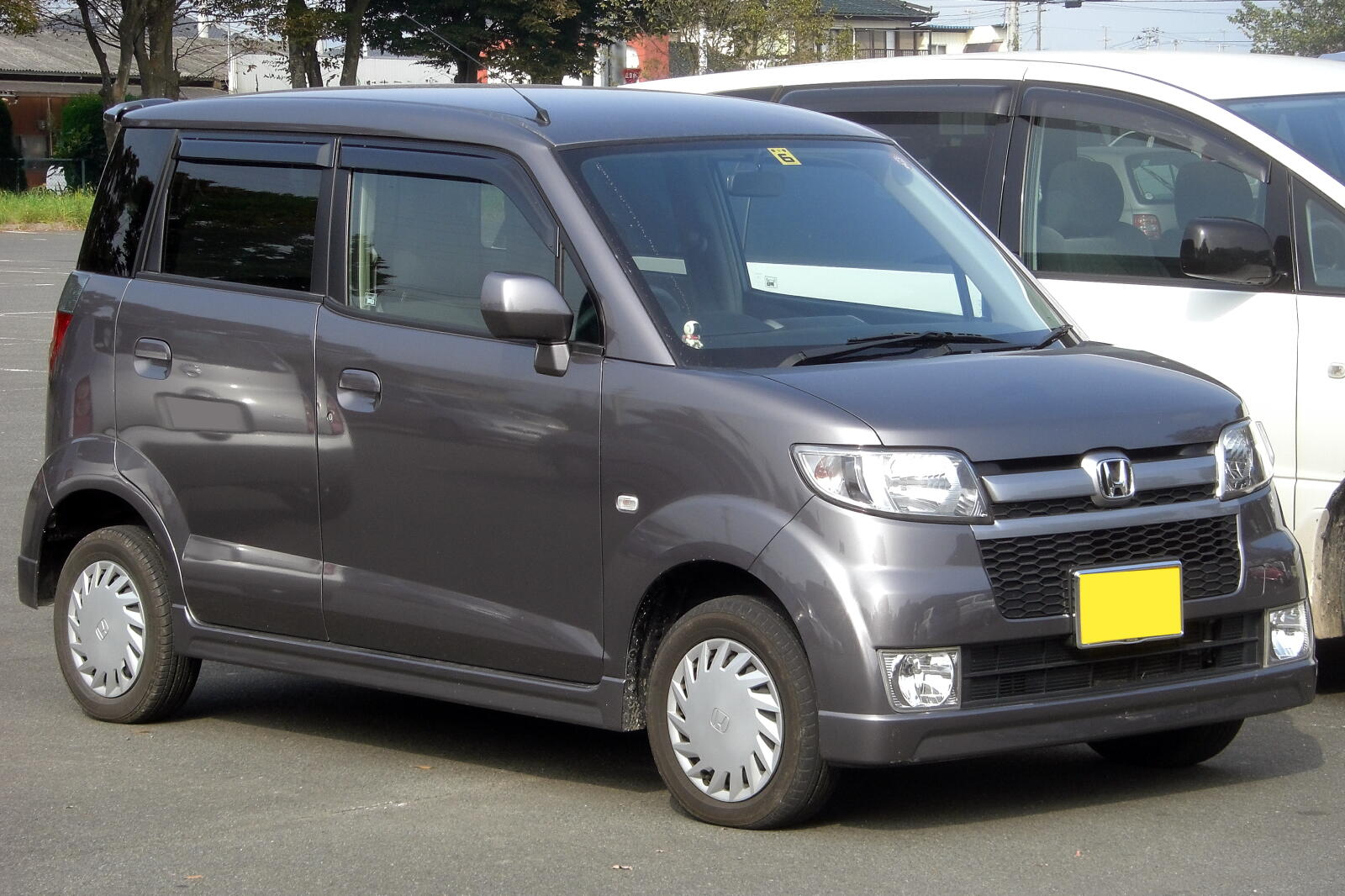
Honda Zest Sports

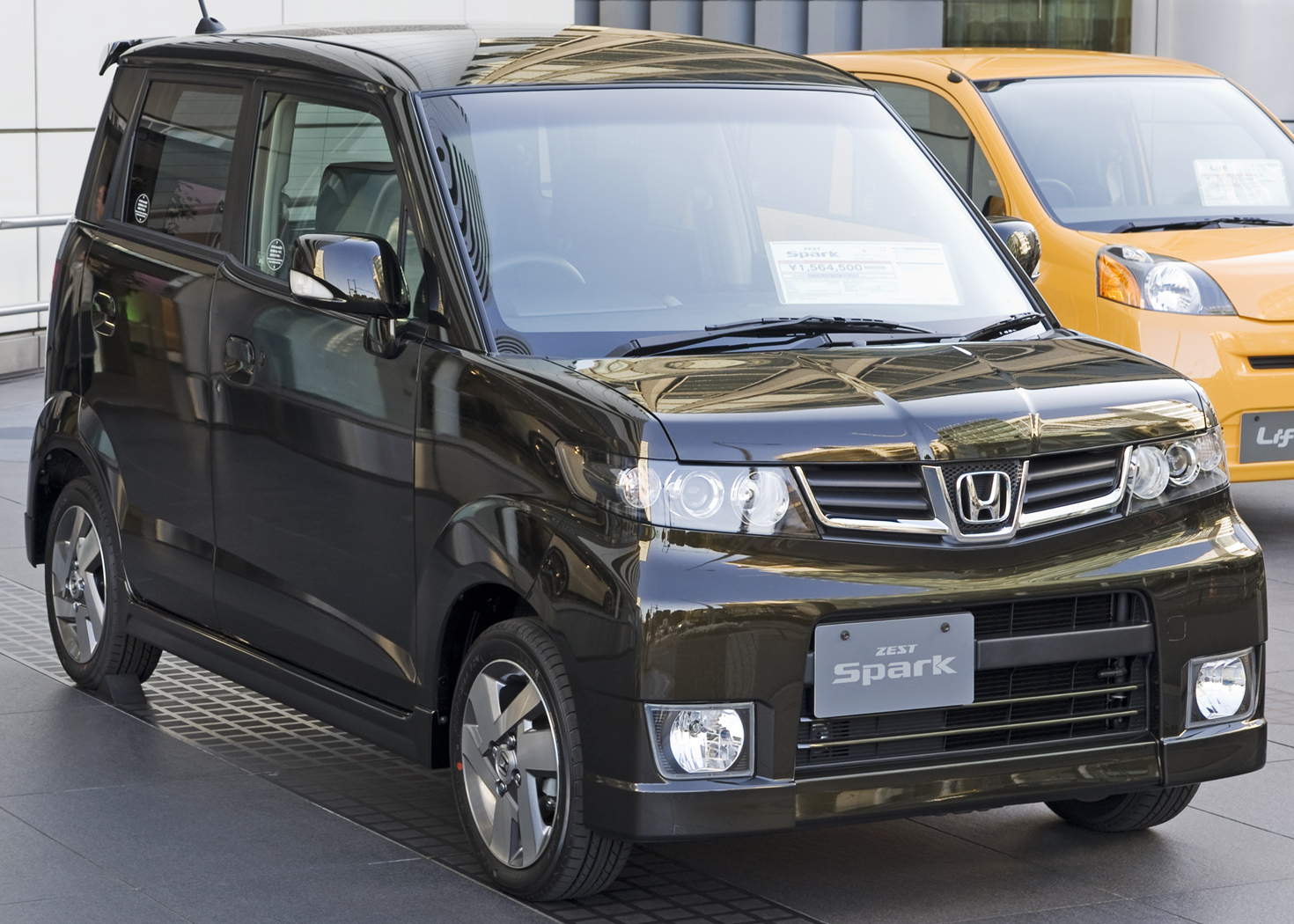
Honda Zest Spark
