= Honda That's =

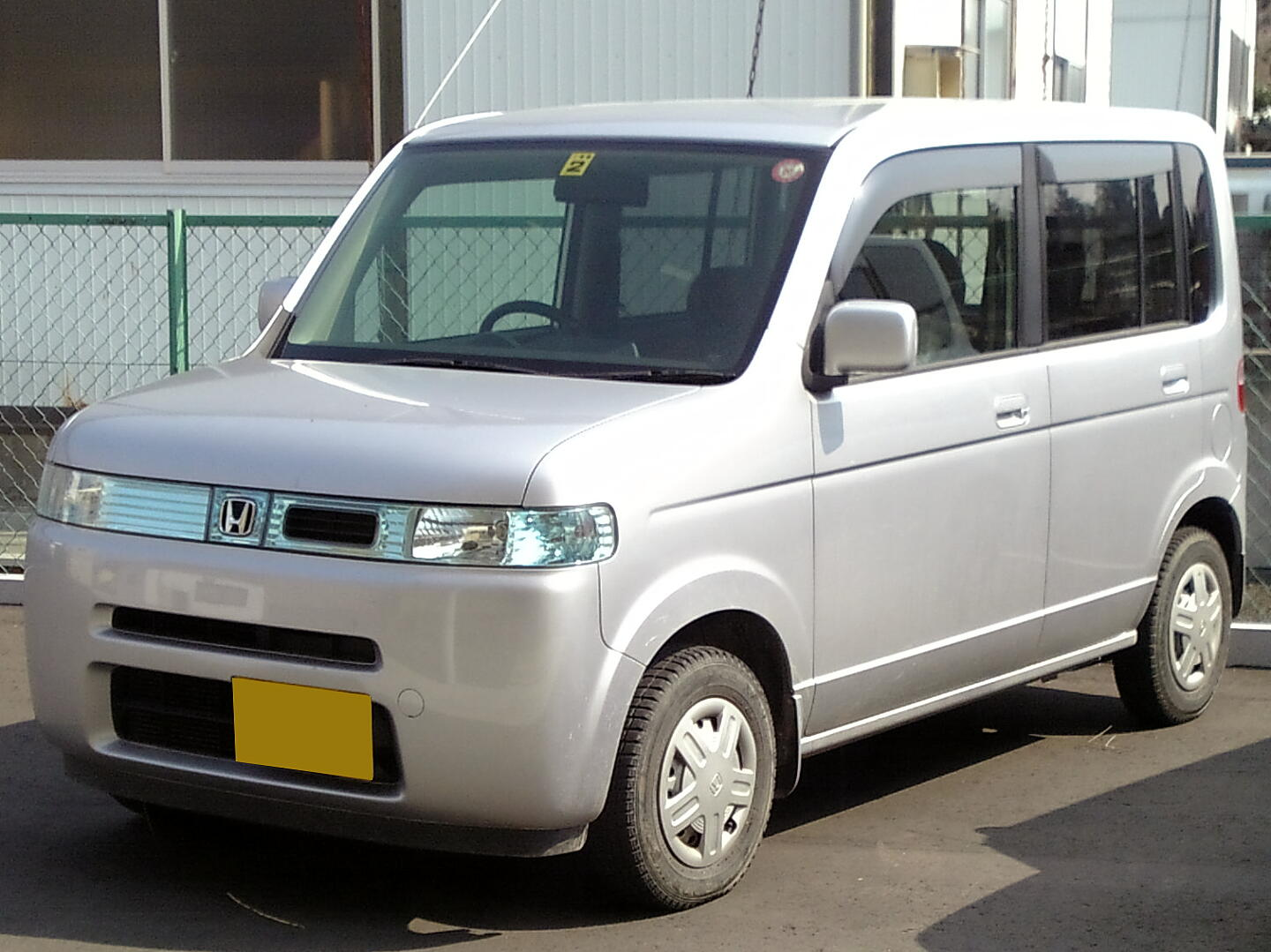
- Pre-facelift model

Overview
- Manufacturer: Honda
- Production: February 2002– November 2007
- Assembly: Japan: Yokkaichi, Mie (Yachiyo Plant)

Body and chassis
- Class: Kei car
- Body style: 5-door hatchback
- Layout: Front-engine, front-wheel-drive
- Related: Honda Life

Powertrain
- Engine: Petrol: 656 cc E07Z I3; 656 cc E07Z turbo I3
- Power output: 38 kW (51 hp; 52 PS); 47 kW (63 hp; 64 PS)
- Transmission: 3-speed automatic

Dimensions
- Wheelbase: 2,360 mm (92.9 in)
- Length: 3,395 mm (133.7 in)
- Width: 1,475 mm (58.1 in)
- Height: 1,620 mm (63.8 in)
- Curb weight: 820–920 kg (1,808–2,028 lb)-920 kg (2,028 lb)

Chronology
- Successor: Honda Zest

The Honda That's (Japanese: ホンダ・ザッツ, Hepburn: Honda Zattsu) is a kei car manufactured by Honda between 2002 and 2007 for the Japanese market. The That's is based on the third-generation Honda Life kei car platform with a five-door "tall wagon" hatchback body, with considerable height.

The name "That's" was chosen in hope that the model could become a familiar car that makes people say "that's it!"

== Overview ==
The design of the That's was previewed by the Honda WIC ("What Is a Car") concept car at the 2001 Tokyo Motor Show in October.

The That's went on sale in Japan on February 8, 2002 with a monthly sales plan of 6,000 units. It was exclusively available at the Honda Primo dealership chain until 2006. It was available in both front-wheel drive and all-wheel drive versions, and it shares the Life's E07Z three-cylinder inline, 656 cc engine, available in either a naturally aspirated, 52 PS (38 kW) variant or a turbocharged iteration with 64 PS (47 kW). The turbo model was dropped in 2006 with the arrival of the turbocharged Honda Zest. All versions only come with a three-speed automatic transmission.

On October 15, 2004, Honda released a special version with a lower price. A minor facelift took place in 2006, with the facelifted That's debuting on March 22; at the same time, the turbocharged version was dropped. Changes to the exterior included the addition of side turn signal lamps at the front of the fender, the removal of ducts from the grille cover to create a unified design, and a change in color from blue to light gray.

Production of the That's ended in September 2007.

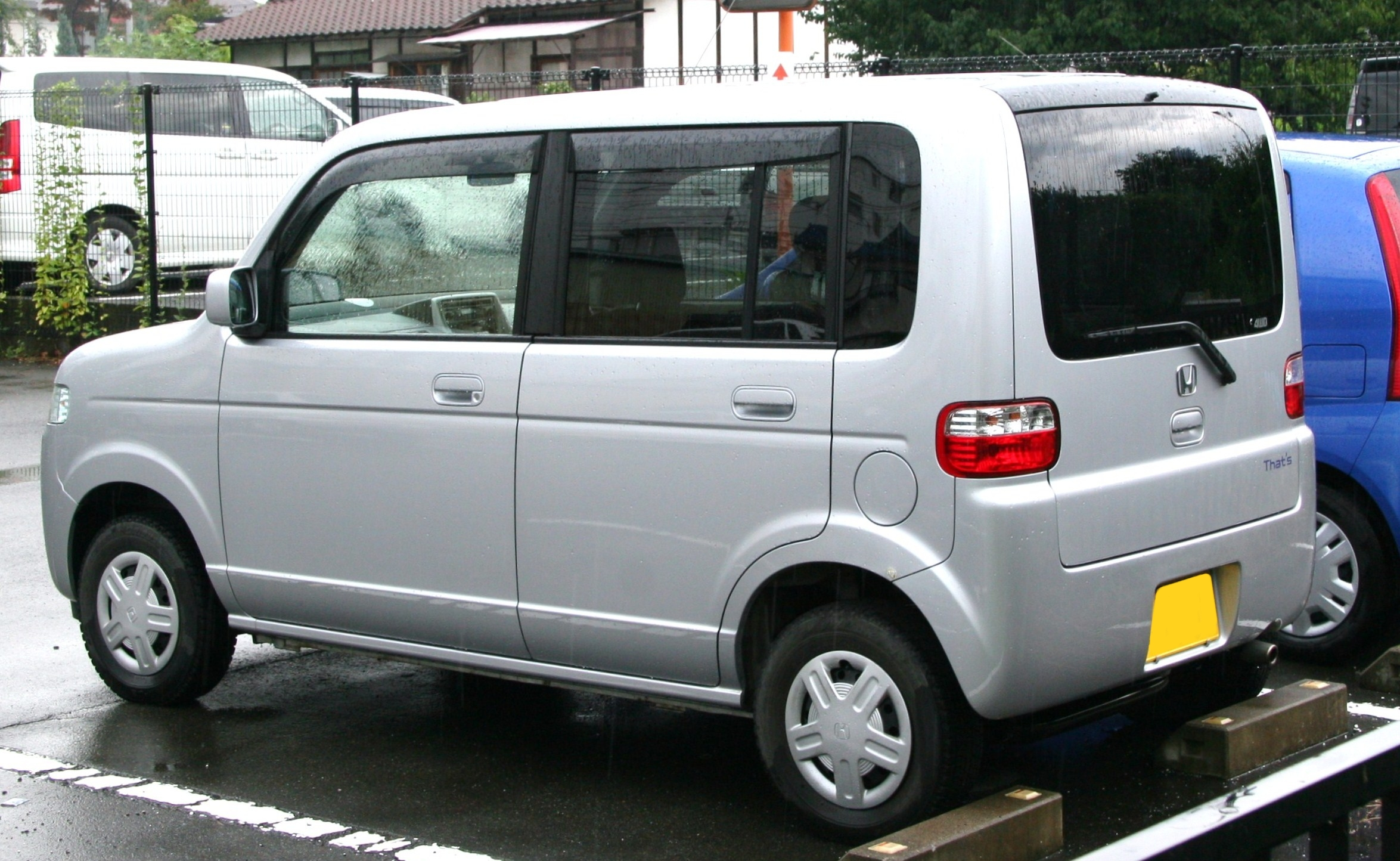
Rear view (pre-facelift)

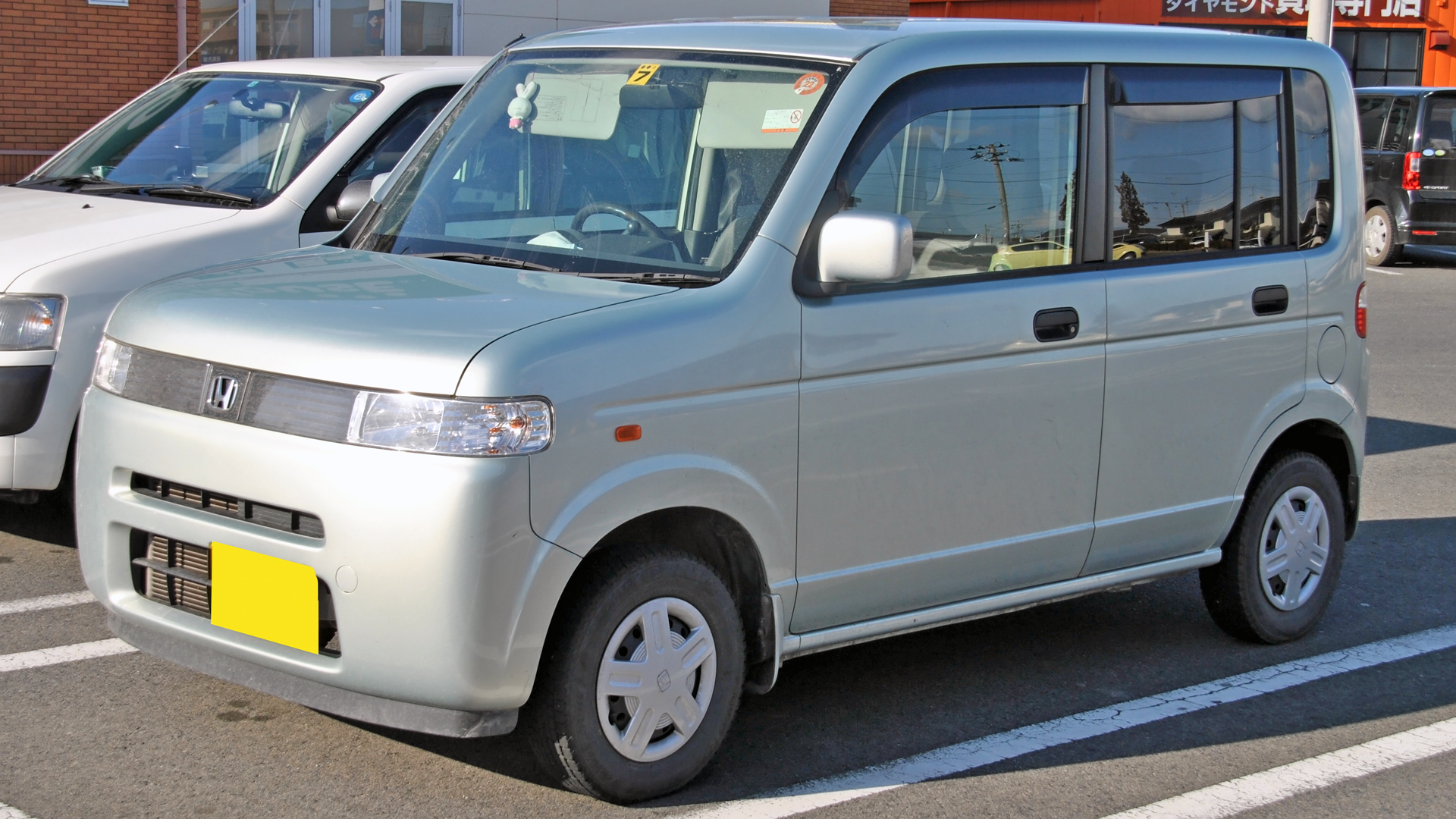
Honda That's (facelift)
