= Airstream (disambiguation) =

Airstream or air stream may refer to:

- Airstream trailers and recreational vehicles
- Ford Airstream concept automobile (2007)
- Chrysler Airstream automobile (1935 to 1936)
- DeSoto Airstream automobile (1935-1936)
- Airstream mechanism (phonetics)
- Air stream (meteorology)

== See also ==
- atmospheric river
- air column
- air current
- Air mass (disambiguation)
- Jet stream (disambiguation)
- Skystream (disambiguation)
- Stream (disambiguation)
- Air (disambiguation)
