= Jet stream (disambiguation) =

The jet stream is a fast-moving high-altitude wind phenomenon.

Jet stream or Jetstream may also refer to:

== Aeronautics ==
- British Aerospace Jetstream, a commuter aircraft
- Handley Page Jetstream, a 1960s twin turboprop aircraft
- BAe Jetstream 41, a "stretched" version of the Handley Page Jetstream
- Jetstream International Airlines, now PSA Airlines, an American regional airline
- Lockheed L-1649 Starliner, called "Jetstream" in TWA service, a four-engine airliner

== Computing ==
- JetStream, a New Zealand internet service brand
- JetStream (software), now Navisworks, a 3D design review package for Microsoft Windows
- JetStream (software test), a browser speed test developed by Apple
- HTC Jetstream, a tablet computer

== Arts and entertainment ==
- Jetstream (comics), a Marvel Comics character
- Jetstream (roller coaster), at Riverview Park, Chicago, Illinois, US
- Jet Stream (Six Flags Magic Mountain), a log flume ride in Santa Clarita, California, US
- "Jetstream" (song), by New Order, 2005
- Jetstream (TV series), a 2008 Canadian documentary series
- Toonami Jetstream, a defunct online broadband streaming service
- Jet Stream, a 2013 film written and produced by Phillip J. Roth
- Jetstream, a superhero character in the 2005 film Sky High
- Jetstream Sam, a character from the video game Metal Gear Rising: Revengeance

== Other uses ==
- Jetstream, a line of hybrid ink ballpoint pens made by Uni-ball
- Roy Green (born 1957), American football player nicknamed Jet Stream

== See also ==
- Contrail, a line-shaped condensation trail produced by aircraft exhaust
- Skystream (disambiguation)
- Airstream (disambiguation)
- Stream (disambiguation)
- Jet (disambiguation)
