= Skystream =

Skystream or sky stream may refer to:

- Skystream Airlines; see List of defunct airlines of the United States (Q–Z)
- SkyStream Networks, an internet video delivery company, a subsidiary of Ericsson Television
- OTC Skystream, an Australian network service of the Overseas Telecommunications Commission
- Sky Stream, a British television streaming service of Sky UK
- Southwest Windpower Skystream, a model line of airborne wind turbines

== See also ==
- Atmospheric river, a linear humid air mass and air current
- Jet stream (disambiguation)
- Airstream (disambiguation)
- Stream (disambiguation)
- Sky (disambiguation)
