= Honda CR-V (fifth generation) =

Compact crossover SUV manufactured by Honda

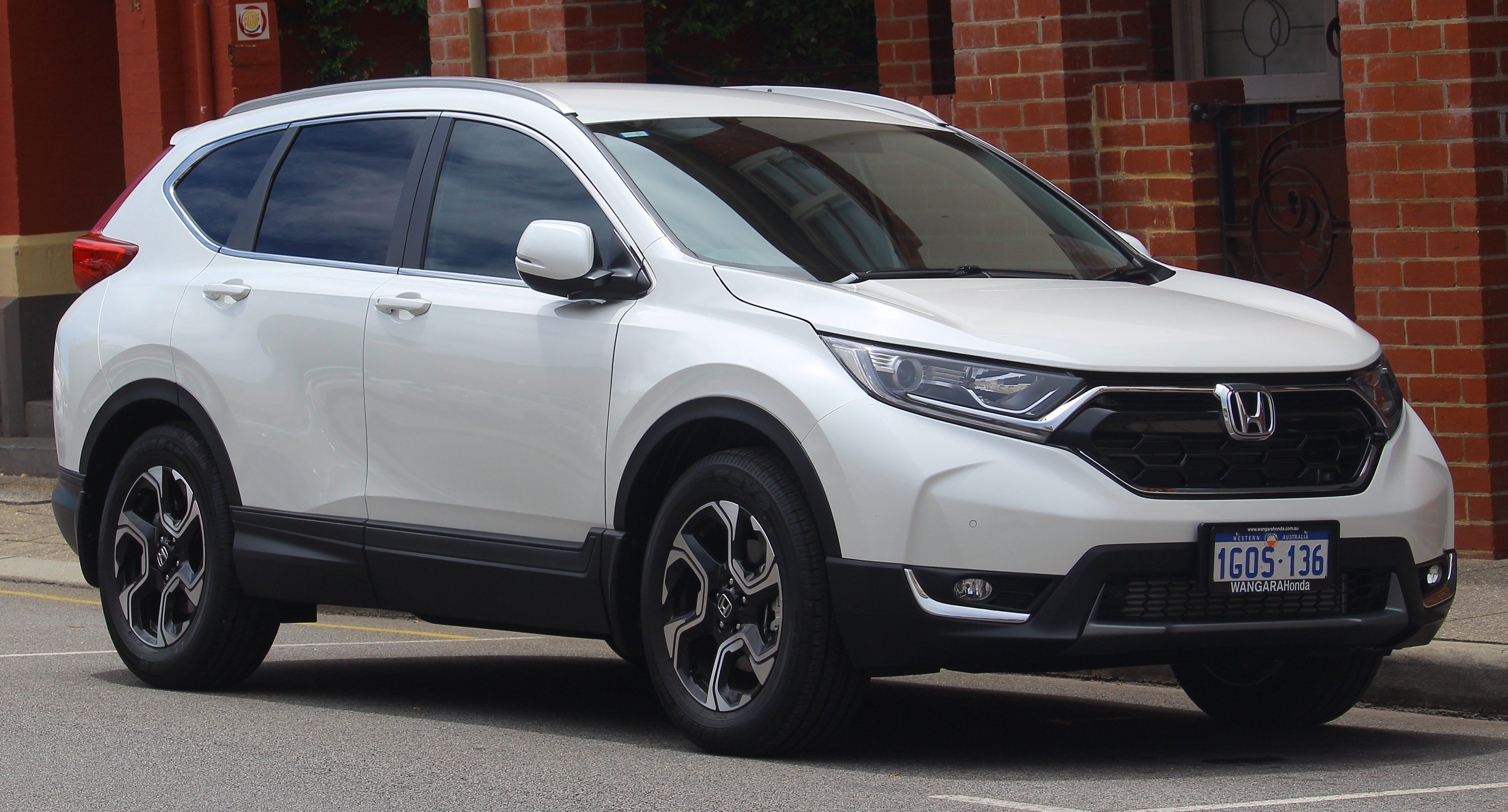
- 2018 Honda CR-V +Sport 2WD (RW1; pre-facelift, Australia)

Overview
- Manufacturer: Honda
- Model code: RW1; RW2; RW3; RW4; RW5; RW6; RW7; RW8; RT5; RT6; RY1; RY2
- Also called: Honda Breeze (China, GAC Honda)
- Production: 2016–2023
- Model years: 2017–2022
- Assembly: Japan: Sayama, Saitama; United States: East Liberty, Ohio (ELAP); Greensburg, Indiana (HMIN); Marysville, Ohio (Marysville Auto Plant); Canada: Alliston, Ontario (HCM); China: Wuhan (Dongfeng Honda); Guangzhou (Guangqi Honda, Breeze); Taiwan: Pingtung; Thailand: Ayutthaya; Malaysia: Alor Gajah, Melaka; Indonesia: Karawang (HPM); India: Greater Noida (HCIL); Vietnam: Vĩnh Phúc
- Designer: Iliya Bridan

Body and chassis
- Class: Compact crossover SUV
- Body style: 5-door SUV
- Layout: Front-engine, front-wheel-drive Front-engine, all-wheel-drive
- Platform: CCA
- Related: Honda Civic (tenth generation)

Powertrain
- Engine: Petrol: 1.5 L L15BE I4 turbo; 2.0 L R20A I4; 2.4 L K24W I4; 2.4 L K24V I4; Petrol hybrid: 2.0 L LFA1 I4; Petrol plug-in hybrid: 2.0 L LFB-13 I4 (CR-V e:PHEV); Diesel: 1.6 L N16A I4 turbo; 1.6 L N16A I4 twin-turbo
- Electric motor: AC synchronous permanent magnet (hybrid)
- Transmission: 6-speed manual CVT; E-CVT (hybrid); 9-speed ZF automatic (diesel)
- Hybrid drivetrain: Honda Sport Hybrid i-MMD (CR-V Hybrid); Honda Sport Hybrid e+ (CR-V PHEV)

Dimensions
- Wheelbase: 2,660 mm (104.7 in)
- Length: 4,584–4,631 mm (180.5–182.3 in)
- Width: 1,855 mm (73.0 in)
- Height: 1,657–1,690 mm (65.2–66.5 in)
- Curb weight: 1,500–1,540 kg (3,307–3,395 lb) (FWD); 1,551–1,618 kg (3,419–3,567 lb) (AWD)

Chronology
- Predecessor: Honda CR-V (fourth generation)
- Successor: Honda CR-V (sixth generation); Honda ZR-V (Japan); Honda Avancier (7-Seater model)

The fifth-generation Honda CR-V is a compact crossover SUV manufactured by Honda from 2016 to 2023, replacing the fourth-generation CR-V. It was first unveiled on 13 October 2016 in Detroit, United States. The fifth-generation of CR-V was available in 5-seater and 7-seater variants in markets other than North America.

The fifth-generation CR-V is based on the Compact Car Architecture (CCA) platform shared with the tenth-generation Civic and the Accord.

== Markets ==
=== United States ===
Sales began in the U.S. on 21 December 2016 for the 2017 model year. Honda began producing the CR-V at East Liberty, Ohio at the East Liberty Auto Plant (ELAP) in November 2016 and at Greensburg, Indiana at the Honda Manufacturing of Indiana (HMIN) plant during February 2017. While most North American market cars are made in the ELAP, HMIN or HCM plants, some, albeit relatively very few, were assembled in Saitama, Japan.

=== Southeast Asia ===
The fifth generation CR-V was also launched in Thailand on 24 March 2017 and in Indonesia on 27 April 2017 at the 25th Indonesia International Motor Show. Indonesian models went on sale on 17 June 2017. The Indonesian model top trim (Prestige) is equipped with 5-spoke 18-inch Modulo alloy wheels not seen in other markets.

On 12 July 2017, Honda Malaysia launched the fifth generation CR-V with four trim levels. After two years, Honda Malaysia launched the CR-V Mugen Limited Edition.

In the Philippines, the 1.6-litre i-DTEC diesel engine manages 120 PS and 300 Nm of torque.

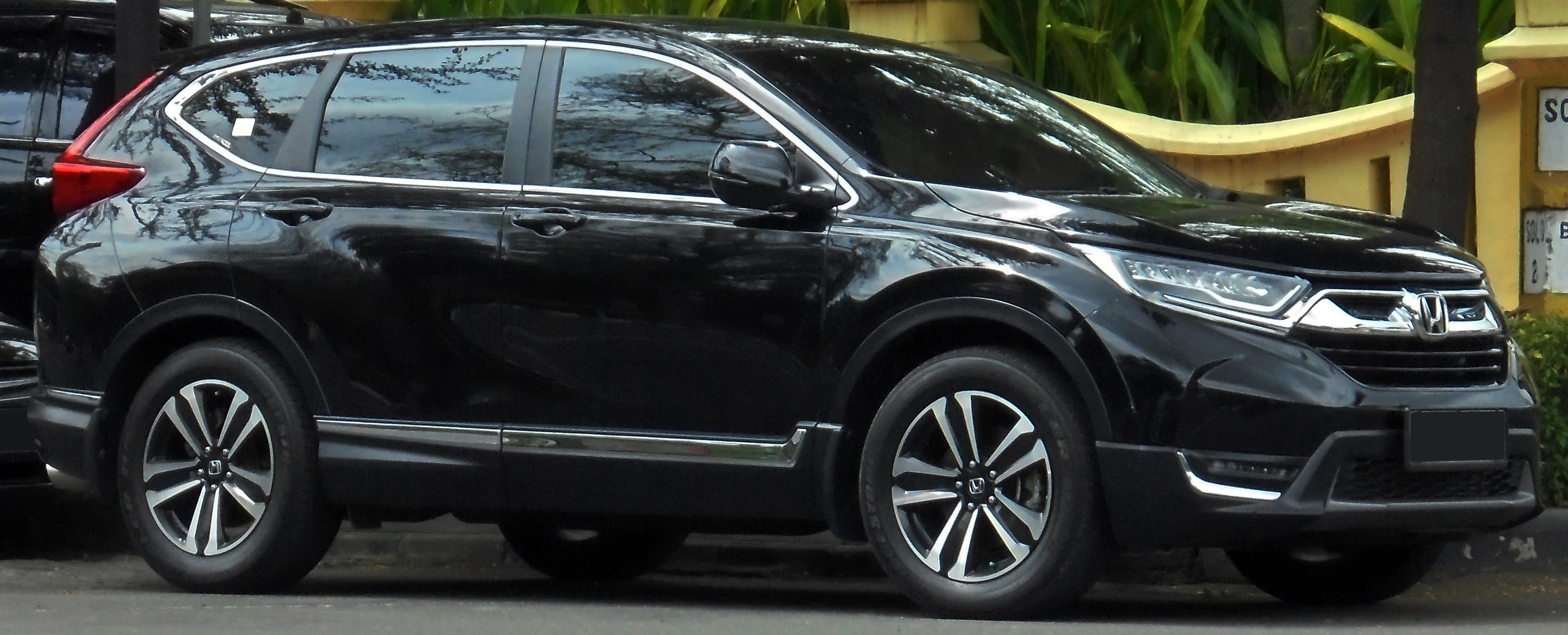
CR-V Prestige with standard Modulo wheels (Indonesia)
Rear view

=== China ===
The 158 kW (212 hp; 215 PS) CR-V Hybrid was unveiled at the 2017 Auto Shanghai in China in April 2017.

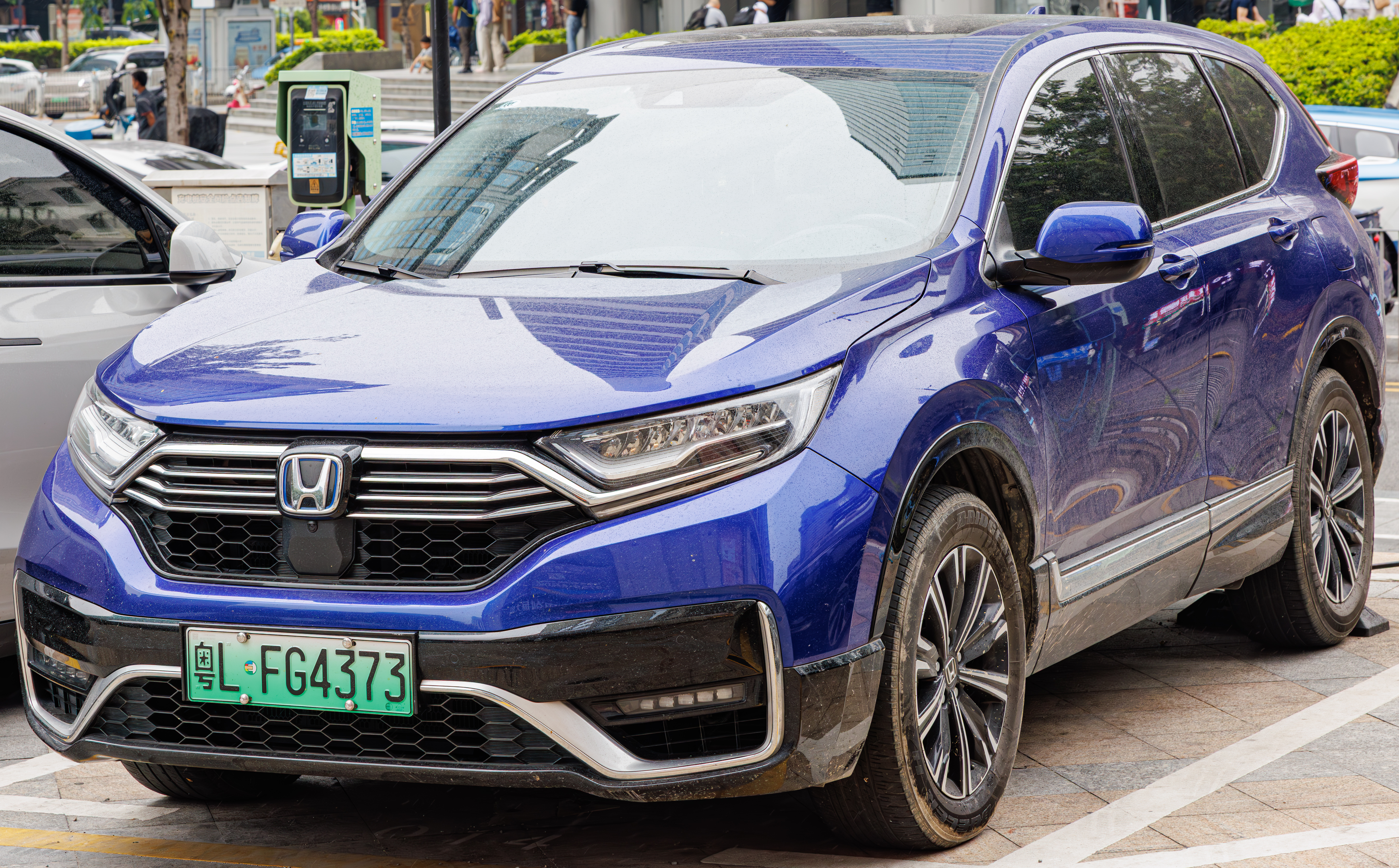
Honda CR-V PHEV (China)

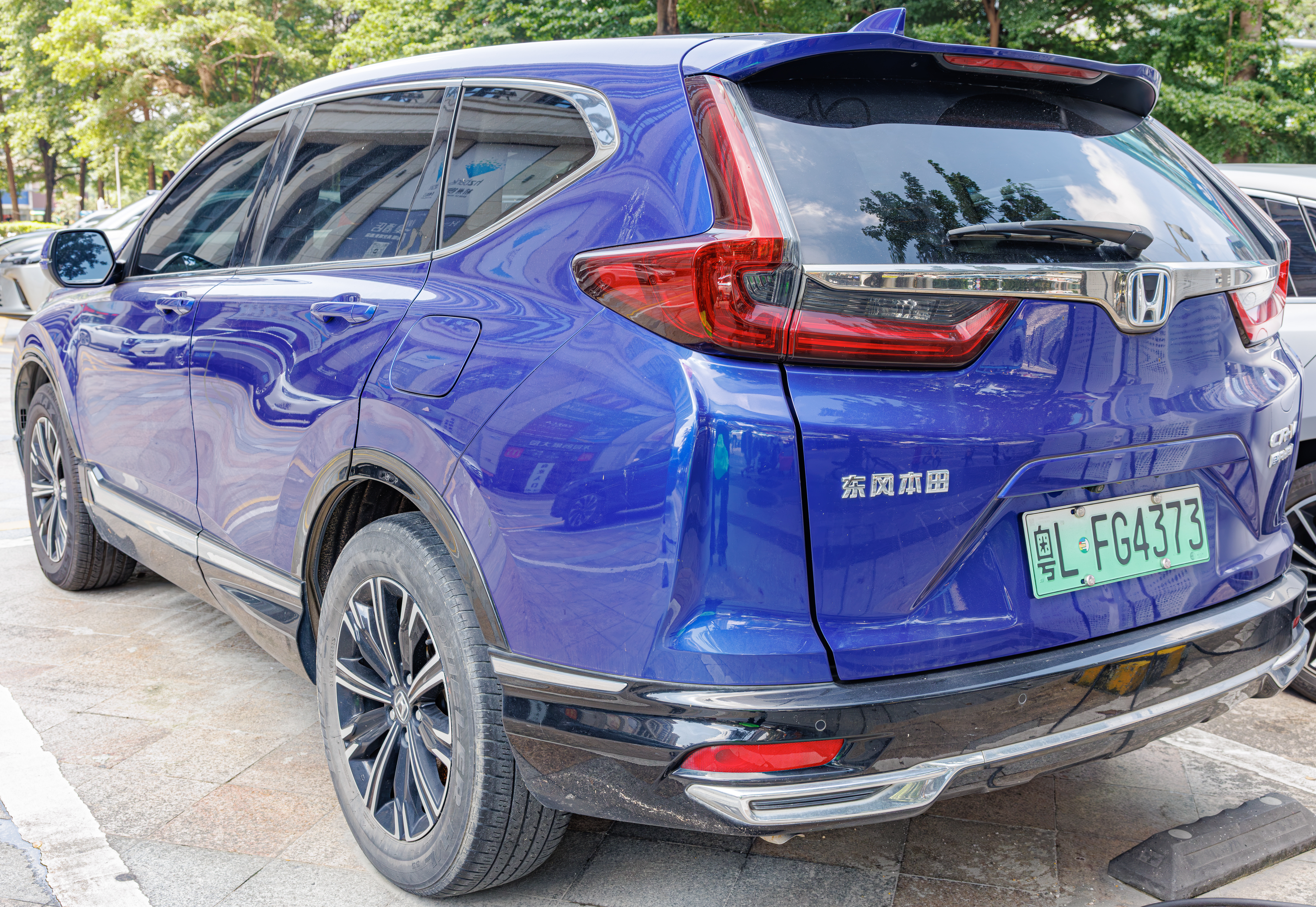
Rear view

=== Japan ===
The fifth generation CR-V was also launched in Japan on 30 August 2018 and went on sale on the following day, making it the return of the CR-V for the Japanese domestic market after a two-year hiatus since the fourth generation CR-V was discontinued there in August 2016. It was previously displayed on 27 October 2017 at the 2017 Tokyo Motor Show, announced on 29 September 2017.

=== Europe ===
The European market CR-V was shown at Geneva Motor Show in March 2018 and went on sale in September, including a seven-seat variant. The CR-V hybrid, which was previewed at the 2017 Frankfurt Motor Show, went on sale in early 2019 with a fuel economy comparable to diesel competitors. Honda expects sales to split equally between petrol and hybrid in three years. The European market fifth-generation CR-V was imported from Japan.

== Equipment ==
In the American market, Honda Sensing package, which includes features like Adaptive Cruise Control (ACC), Collision Mitigation Braking (CMBS) and Lane Keeping Assist (LKAS), is standard on EX and above trims; the package was formerly reserved to the Touring trim prior to the fifth generation release. New safety features introduced include: Blind Spot Information (BSI) with Rear Cross Traffic Monitor (CTM), replacing the LaneWatch system from the previous generation CR-V, and Auto High Beam (HSS) headlights. Honda Sensing is standard on all CR-V trim levels for 2020 and adds traffic sign recognition.

LED daytime running lights, 18" alloy wheels and electronic parking brake with a new auto-hold feature are available. Additional, new features include 4-way driver's seat power lumbar, a power lift-gate, active grille shutter system to reduce aerodynamic drag, Android Auto/Apple CarPlay on a 7-inch touch screen display with volume knob, 7-inch TFT instrument display and LED headlights.

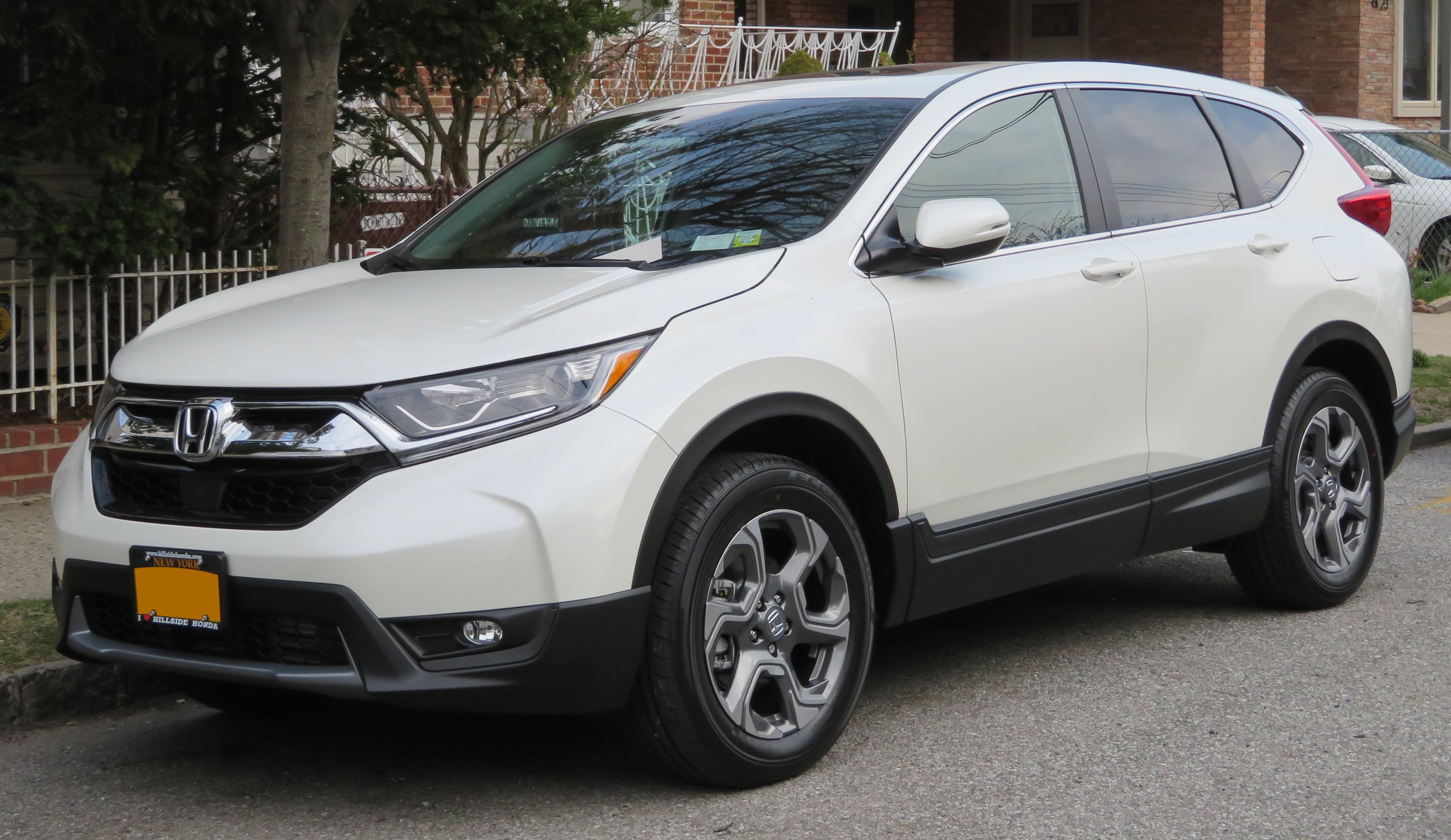
2017 Honda CR-V AWD (RW2; pre-facelift, US)

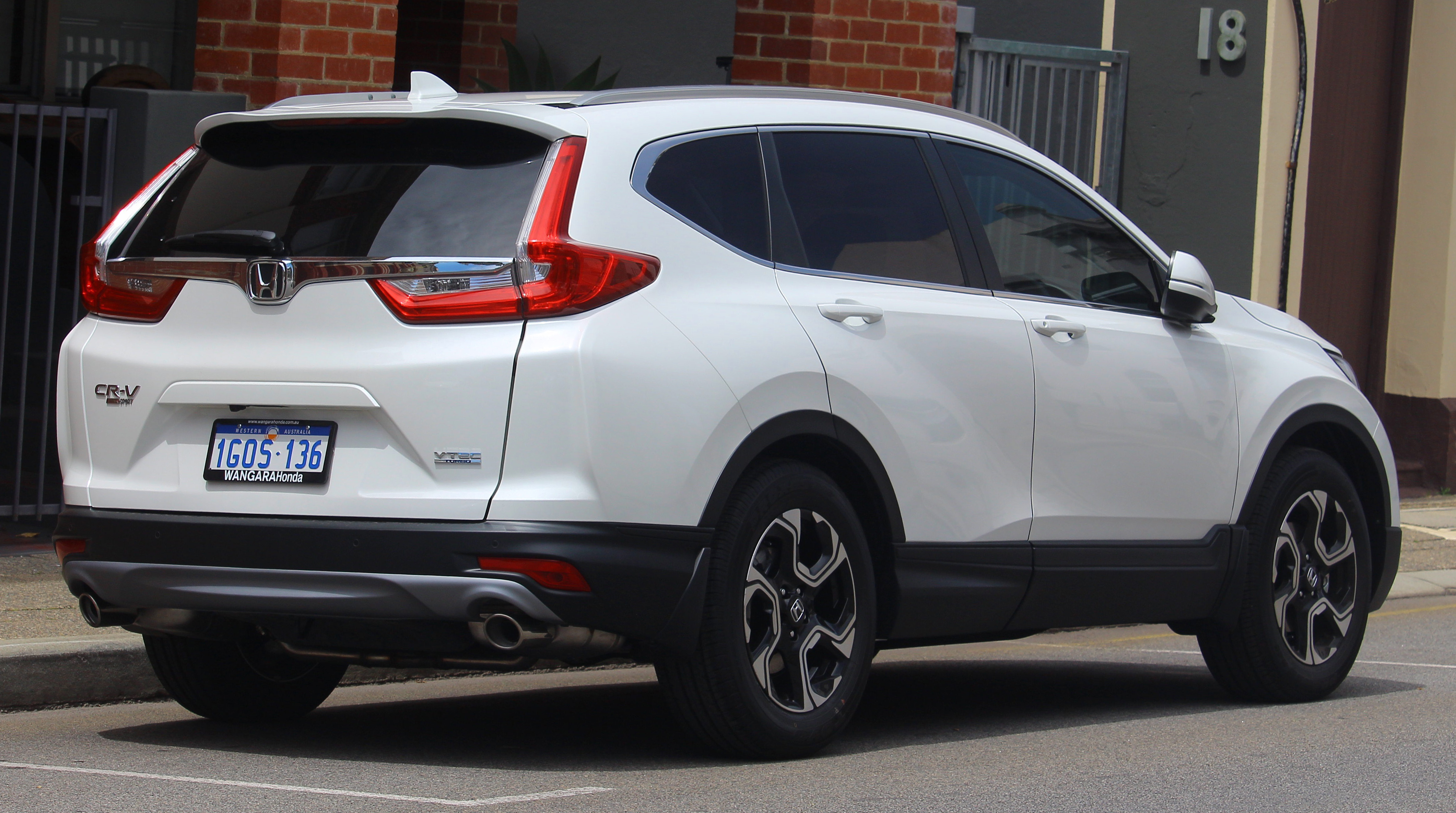
2018 Honda CR-V +Sport 2WD (RW1; pre-facelift, Australia)

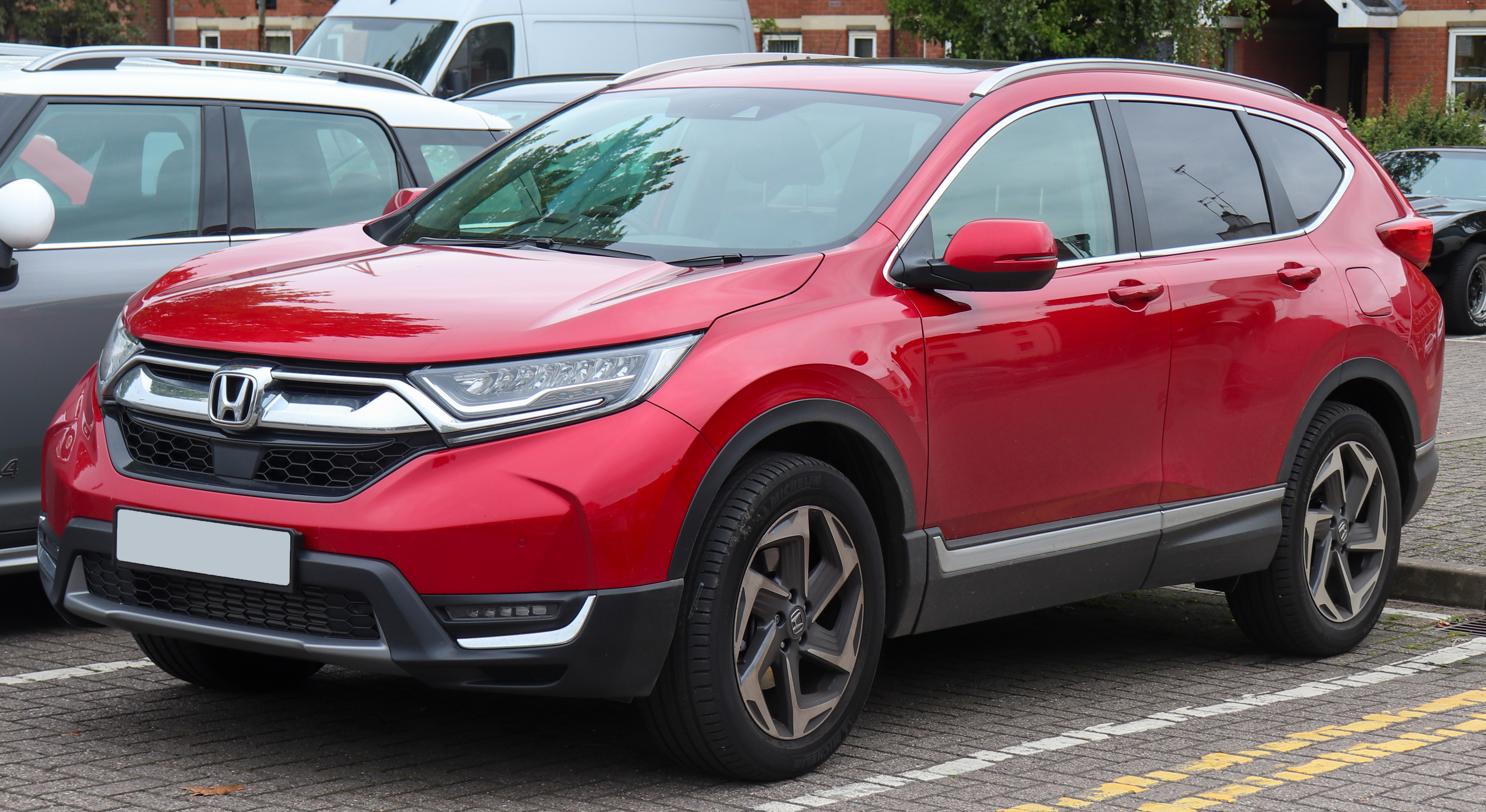
2019 Honda CR-V EX (RW1; pre-facelift, UK)

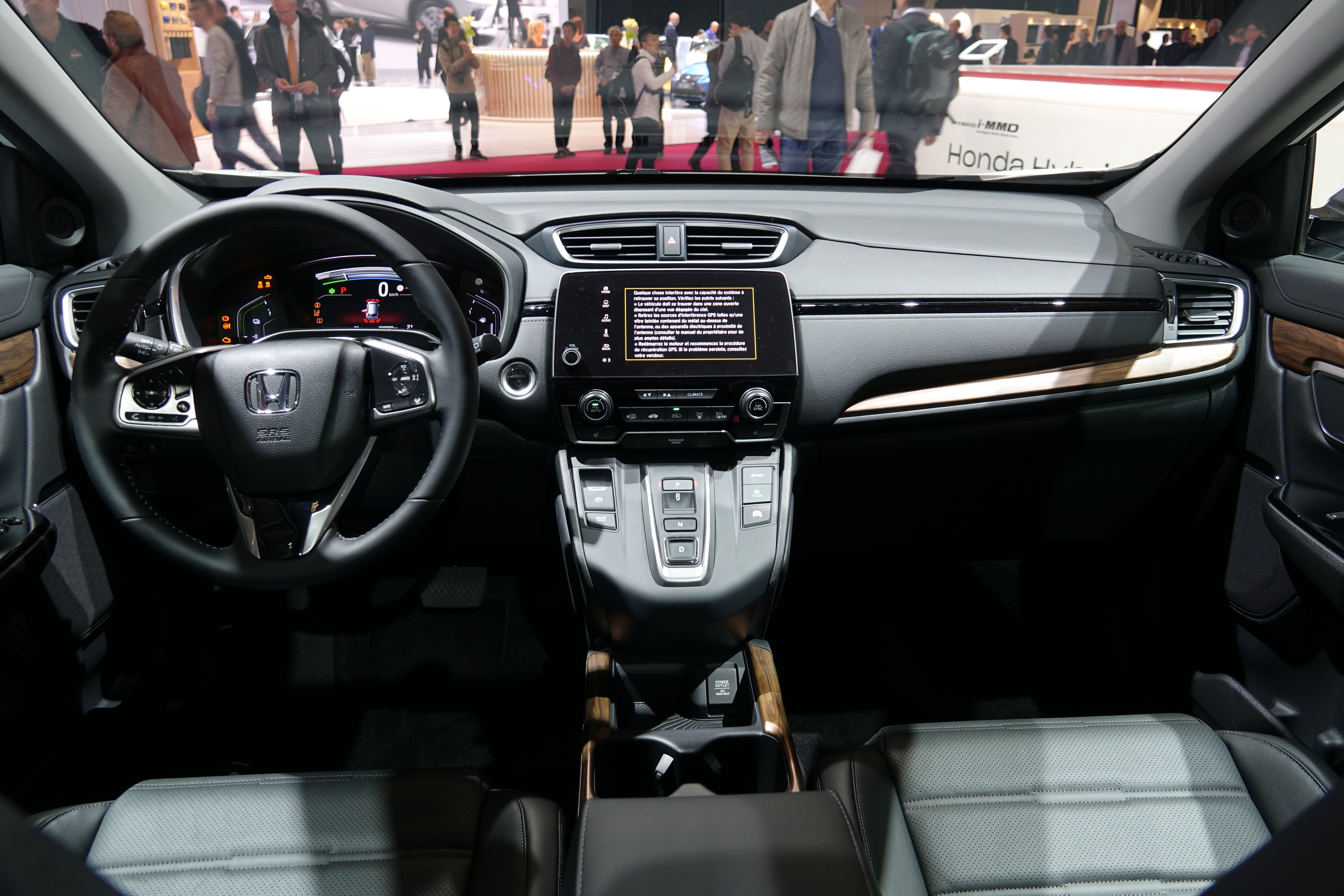
Interior (hybrid)

== Facelift ==
Honda unveiled a refreshed CR-V on 18 September 2019, initially for the North American market. For the first time in North America, the refreshed model introduced a hybrid powertrain as an option. However, the hybrid model was not introduced in Canada. The CR-V Hybrid features a 2.0-litre Atkinson-cycle four-cylinder petrol engine with Honda's i-MMD hybrid system. The hybrid version was assembled at Honda's Greensburg, Indiana assembly plant which also produces the standard petrol-only CR-V, while the powertrain was assembled in Anna, Ohio. The previously-available 2.4-litre naturally-aspirated petrol engine that powered the base LX trim was dropped from the CR-V lineup for 2020. The LX trim is still available in Canada with a 1.5-litre engine. Additionally, the CR-V's suite of advanced safety features are standard on every trim level, meaning even the most affordable CR-V provides adaptive cruise control and the latest crash prevention technology. The petrol-only CR-V went on sale at Honda dealerships across North America starting in late fall 2019, while the CR-V Hybrid went on sale in early 2020.

Other changes for the 2020 CR-V include larger 19-inch alloy wheels on top-line Touring models, redesigned 18-inch alloy wheels for EX and EX-L trims, a revised front fascia with a new upper grille (which also features a blue-outlined Honda 'H' emblem on CR-V Hybrid models), revised side skirts with chrome inserts, a new rear bumper with chrome insert, a push button-controlled CVT for CR-V Hybrid models, LED front fog lamps on most models (except on the base LX trim), new exterior color options and standard Honda Sensing driver assistance technology for all models.

The facelifted CR-V was also released in Thailand on 14 July 2020, including the panoramic sunroof, wireless charger, Honda Sensing, automatic-dimming rear-view mirror and memory seat, and the 1.6 DT-E FWD was discontinued. In August 2021, Honda launched the CR-V Black Edition in Thailand, giving buyers a choice of a fully blacked out variant of the popular family SUV. Power comes from the long-serving 2.4-litre i-VTEC and a CVT combo. The Black Edition loses out on Honda Sensing which is fitted to the top-spec turbo-diesel variant, though still has a panoramic glass roof.

In Malaysia, the facelifted CR-V was launched on 5 November 2020, which gets some minor styling changes and new features. The SUV's variant line-up also sees a revision, with just three options available instead of four previously. The base variant remains the 2.0 2WD. The remaining two variants are both turbocharged, 1.5 TC-P 2WD and the new 1.5 TC-P 4WD as the range-topping variant. In October 2021, Honda Malaysia unveiled a new model for the CR-V called the Black Edition based on the 1.5 TC-P 2WD variant.

The facelifted CR-V was also released in Indonesia on 18 February 2021, including Honda Sensing for Prestige variant, standard LED headlamps and fog lamps for all variants, along with 5-inch TFT instrument cluster and 7-inch touchscreen display for 1.5 Turbo and 1.5 Turbo Prestige variants. The Prestige variant no longer has Modulo wheels and now shares the same new wheel design with the 1.5 Turbo variant while the 2.0 variant retained the pre-facelift wheels. In December 2021, Honda launched the Black Edition variant in Indonesia.

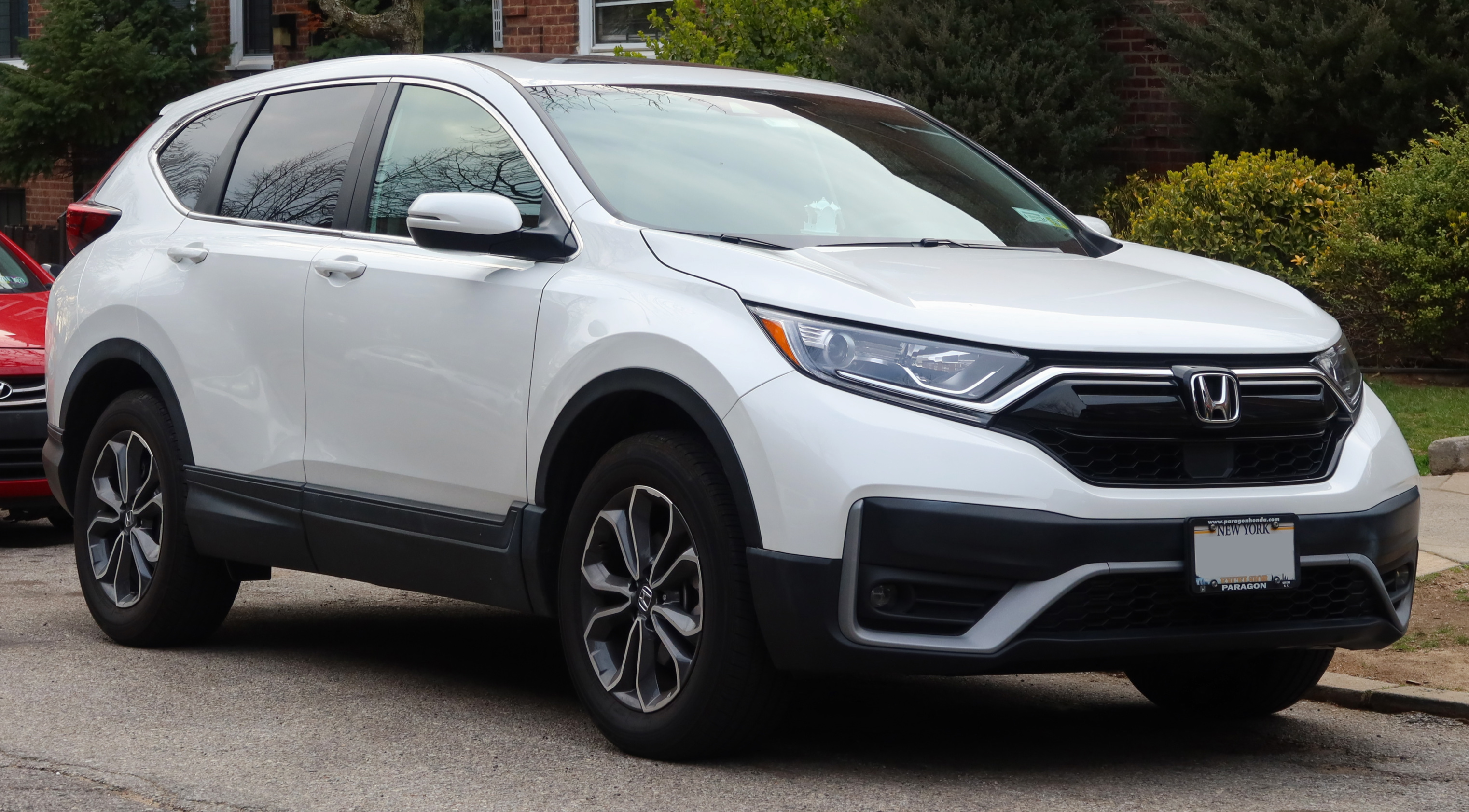
2022 Honda CR-V EX-L (RW1; facelift, US)

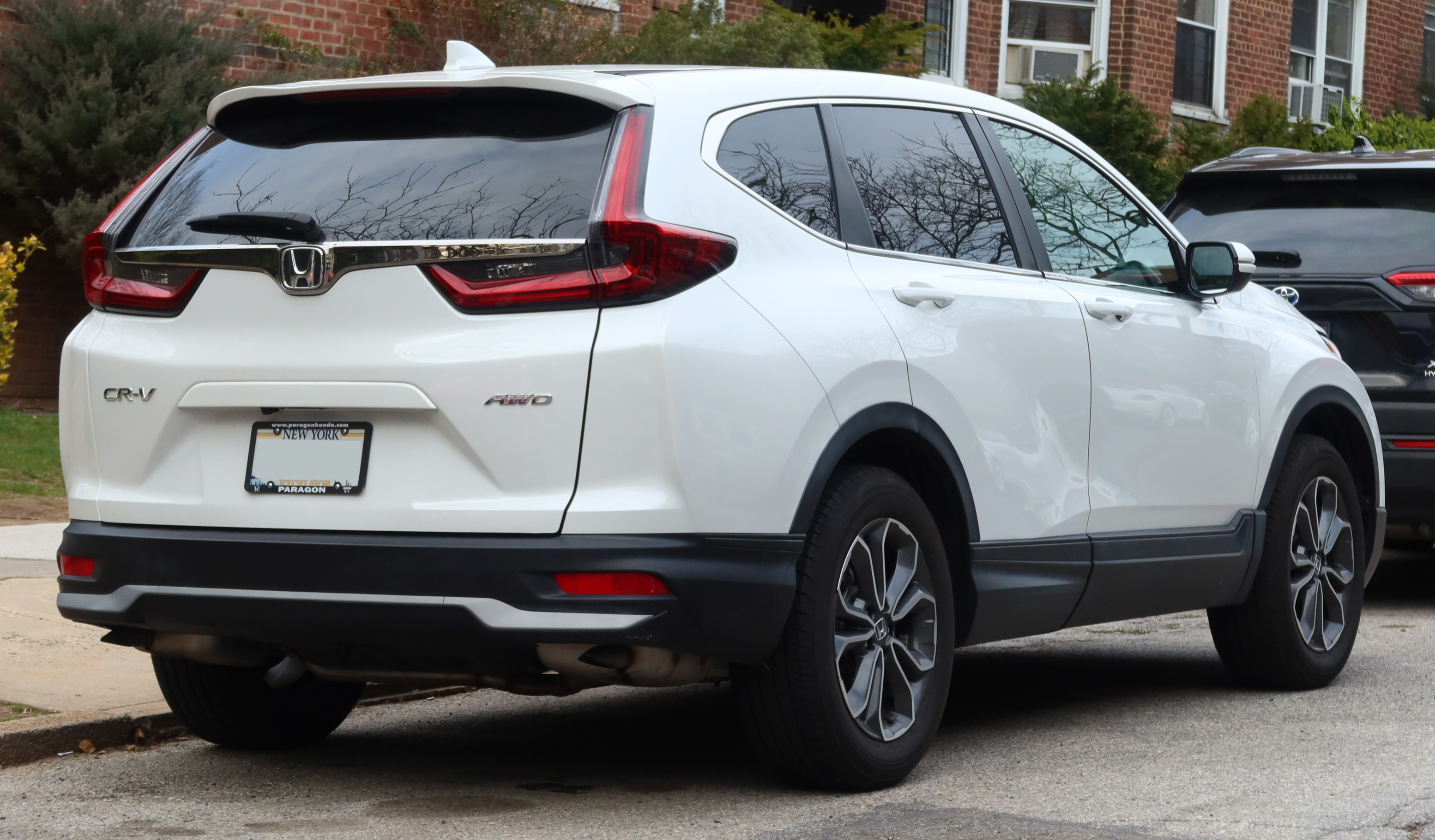
Rear view

== Honda Breeze ==
The Chinese market variant with different front and rear fascias is called the Honda Breeze (Chinese: 皓影; pinyin: Hàoyǐng), produced and sold by Guangqi Honda. It was launched on 18 October 2019. The Breeze was also available as a hybrid and was sold alongside the international facelift version CR-V produced by Dongfeng Honda.

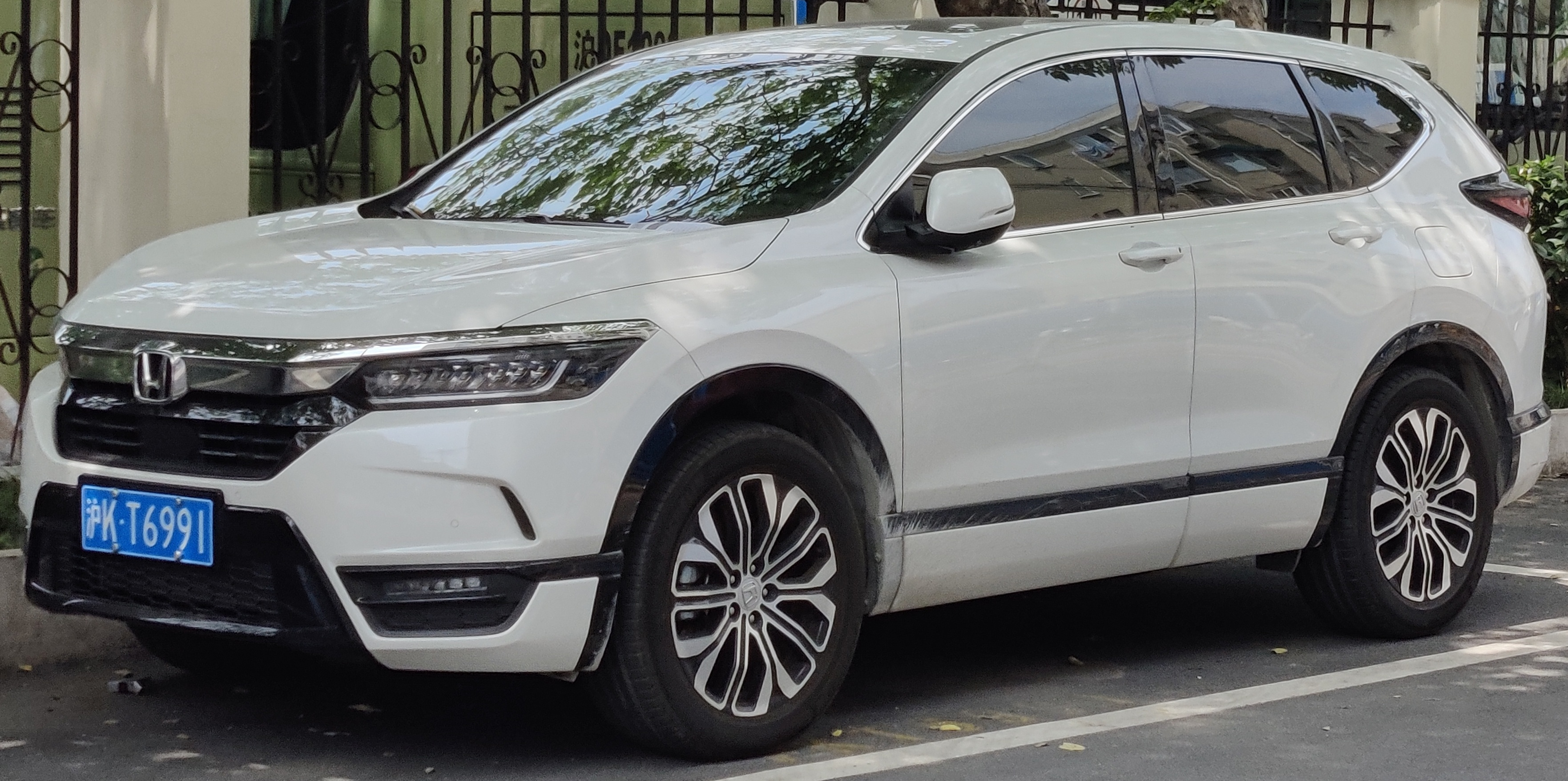
Honda Breeze (China)

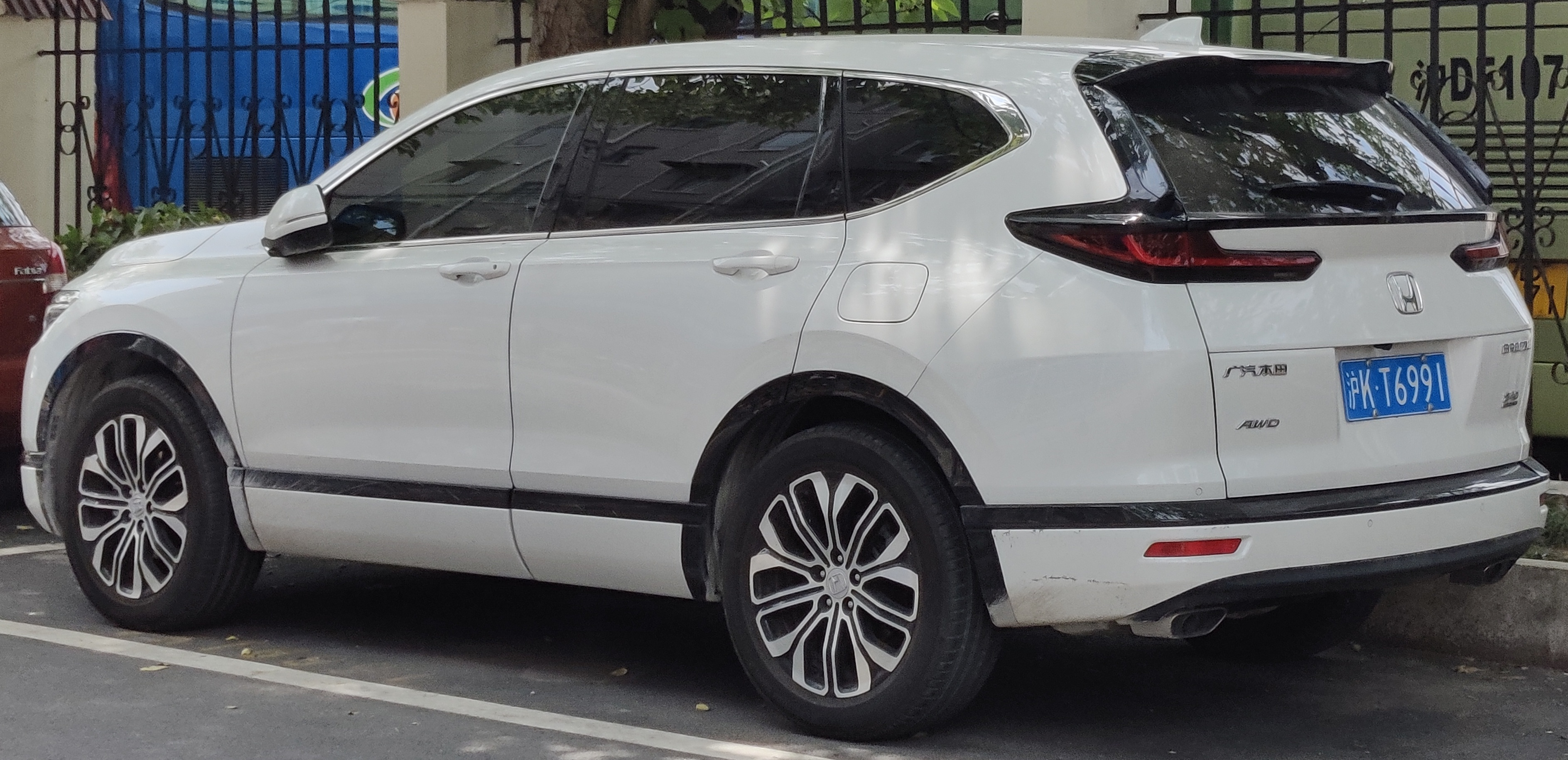
Rear view

== Powertrain ==
The base engine is an Earth Dreams 2.4-litre I4 engine with 184 hp (137 kW; 187 PS); a turbocharged 1.5-litre I4 with 190 hp (142 kW; 193 PS) was offered. The turbocharged engine delivers peak torque between 2,000 rpm and 5,000 rpm whereas the naturally-aspirated engine delivers its peak torque at 3,900 rpm. U.S. and Canada models are only available with continuously variable transmission. In 2019, for the 2020 model year, Honda has made the 1.5-litre engine standard on all CR-V trim levels sold in the United States and Canada.

In some markets, the CR-V was also available with a 1.6-litre Honda i-DTEC turbo-diesel option, producing 160 hp (119 kW; 162 PS) paired to a ZF 9HP transversely-mounted 9-speed automatic transmission. The i-DTEC turbo-diesel engine has been revised from having a single variable-nozzle turbocharger in the earlier version to having two turbochargers - one for low RPMs and the other for high RPMs - to minimize turbo lag. It uses an aluminum cylinder head paired to an open-deck cylinder block, with shorter and thinner piston skirts to reduce mechanical friction to levels comparable to a petrol engine.

Engine	Chassis code	Horsepower	Torque
1.5 L L15BE I4 turbo	RW1 (FWD); RW2 (AWD); RY1 (Breeze)	190 hp (142 kW) at 5,600 rpm	179 lb⋅ft (243 N⋅m) at 2,000–5,000 rpm
2.0 R20Z1 I4	RW3 (FWD); RW4 (AWD)	151 hp (113 kW) at 6,500 rpm	139 lb⋅ft (188 N⋅m) at 4,300 rpm
2.4 L K24V5 I4	RW5 (FWD); RW6 (AWD)	173 hp (129 kW) at 6,200 rpm	165 lb⋅ft (224 N⋅m) at 4,000 rpm
2.4 L K24W9 I4	RW5 (FWD); RW6 (AWD)	184 hp (137 kW) at 6,400 rpm	180 lb⋅ft (244 N⋅m) at 3,900 rpm
1.6 L N16A4 I4 twin-turbo diesel	RW7 (FWD); RW8 (AWD)	160 hp (119 kW) at 4,000 rpm	258 lb⋅ft (350 N⋅m) at 2,000 rpm
1.6 L N16A5 I4 turbo diesel	RW7 (FWD); RW8 (AWD)	120 hp (89 kW) at 4,000 rpm	221 lb⋅ft (300 N⋅m) at 2,000 rpm
2.0 L LFA1 I4 hybrid petrol	RT5 (FWD); RT6 (AWD); RY3 (Breeze)	212 hp (158 kW) (combined output)	129 lb⋅ft (175 N⋅m) gas, 232 lb⋅ft (315 N⋅m) electric; 232 lb⋅ft (315 N⋅m) combined.
2.0 L LFB-13 I4 PHEV petrol	RT7; RY7(Breeze)	212 hp (158 kW) (combined output)	129 lb⋅ft (175 N⋅m) gas, 232 lb⋅ft (315 N⋅m) electric; 232 lb⋅ft (315 N⋅m) combined.

== Safety ==
ANCAP test results Honda CR-V (2017)
Test	Score
Overall	5 /5 stars
Frontal offset	14.76/16
Side impact	16/16
Pole	2/2
Seat belt reminders	3/3
Whiplash protection	Good
Pedestrian protection	Adequate
Electronic stability control	Standard

NHTSA 2017 CR-V:
Overall:	5/5 stars
Frontal Driver:	5/5 stars
Frontal Passenger:	5/5 stars
Side Driver:	5/5 stars
Side Passenger:	5/5 stars
Side Pole Driver:	5/5 stars
Rollover FWD:	/ 16.3%
Rollover AWD:	/ 16.2%

Euro NCAP test results Honda CR-V (2019)
Test	Points	%
Overall:	5 /5 stars	
Adult occupant:	35.7	93%
Child occupant:	40.7	83%
Pedestrian:	33.6	70%
Safety assist:	9.9	76%

ASEAN NCAP test results Honda CR-V (2017)
Test	Points
Overall:	5 /5 stars
Adult occupant:	47.25
Child occupant:	22.84
Safety assist:	18.71

TNCAP (1.0) test result Honda CR-V 1.5 VTi (2023, similar to Euro NCAP 2017)
Test	Points	%
Overall:	3/5 stars	
Adult occupant:	27.747	73%
Child occupant:	25.566	52%
Pedestrian:	30.605	72%
Safety assist:	4.855	40%

Preceded by Honda CR-V (fourth generation)	Honda CR-V (fifth generation); 2016–present	Succeeded by Honda CR-V (sixth generation)
