= Honda R engine =

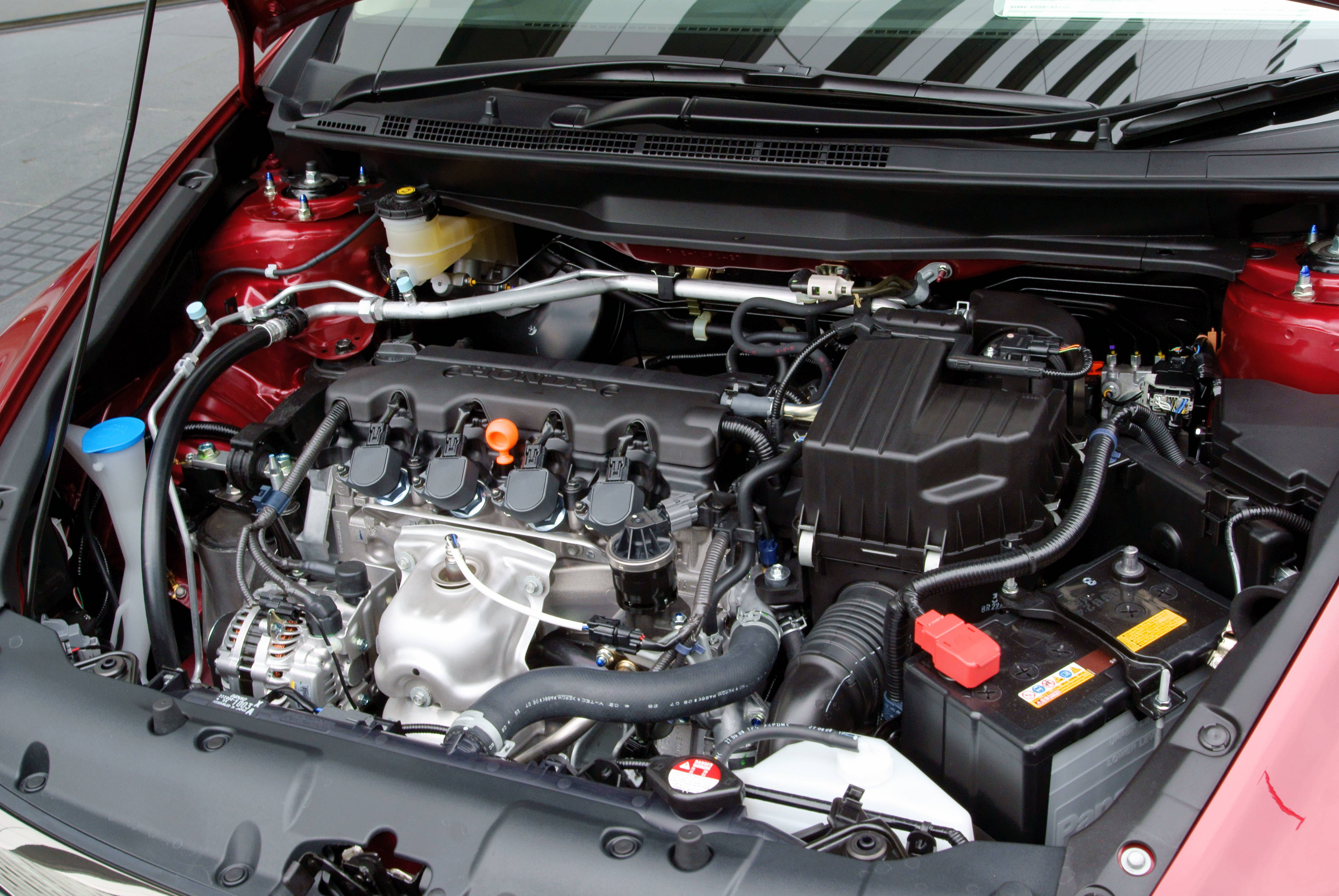

Overview
- Manufacturer: Honda Motor Co Ltd
- Production: 2006–present

Layout
- Configuration: Naturally aspirated Straight-4
- Displacement: 1.6–2.0 L; 97.3–121.9 cu in (1,595–1,997 cc)
- Cylinder bore: 81 mm (3.19 in)
- Piston stroke: 77.4 mm (3.05 in); 87.3 mm (3.44 in); 96.9 mm (3.81 in)
- Cylinder block material: Aluminum alloy
- Cylinder head material: Aluminum alloy
- Valvetrain: SOHC 4 valves x cyl. with i-VTEC; DOHC 4 valves x cyl. with i-VTEC (LF Hybrid engine)
- Compression ratio: 10.5:1-10.7:1

RPM range
- Max. engine speed: 6800

Combustion
- Fuel system: PGM-FI
- Fuel type: Gasoline
- Cooling system: Water-cooled

Output
- Power output: 125–156 PS (92–115 kW; 123–154 bhp)
- Torque output: 15.4–19.4 kg⋅m (151–190 N⋅m; 111–140 lb⋅ft)

The Honda R engine is an inline-four engine launched in 2006 for the Honda Civic (non-Si). It is fuel injected, has an aluminum-alloy cylinder block and cylinder head, is a SOHC 16-valve design (four valves per cylinder) and utilizes Honda's i-VTEC system. The R series engine has a compression ratio of 10.5:1, features a "drive by wire" throttle system which is computer controlled to reduce pumping losses and create a smooth torque curve.

The engine uses many advanced technologies to improve fuel economy and reduce friction. Piston rings are given an ion plating and weight is reduced with plastic and aluminum parts and variable length intake manifolds that maintain ram air at a wide RPM range. The engine also features piston cooling jets, previously available only on high performance engines, and in the ninth-generation 1.8L Civic (2012-2015) the pistons are treated with molybdenum disulfide applied in a polka-dot pattern. The automatic transmission model is rated at California Air Resources Board (CARB) ULEV-2 (Ultra Low Emissions Vehicle) with fuel economy 25 mpg_{‑US} (9.4 L/100 km; 30 mpg_{‑imp}) city, and 36 mpg_{‑US} (6.5 L/100 km; 43 mpg_{‑imp}) highway. It also uses the same computer (engine control unit) controlled distributorless coil-on-plug ignition as the Honda K-series engines. As of September 2019, the R series engines were only offered outside of Japan.

== R16 ==
The R16 engines all have a bore and stroke of 81 mm × 77.4 mm (3.19 in × 3.05 in), for an overall displacement of 1.6 L (1,595 cc; 97.33 cu in).

=== R16A ===
- Found in:
  - 2006 Honda Civic (Singapore, Egypt, Turkey Market – FA1/FD series)
  - 2012 Honda Civic (Singapore, Egypt, Turkey Market – FB series)
    - SOHC iVTEC (Chain driven cam)
    - Compression: 10.5:1
    - Power: 125 PS (92 kW; 123 bhp) at 6,500 rpm
    - Torque: 15.4 kg⋅m (151 N⋅m; 111 lb⋅ft) at 4,300 rpm
    - Transmission: 5-speed
    - Redline: 6800 rpm

=== R16B ===
- Found in:
  - 2016 Honda Civic (Mauritius, Singapore, Egypt, Turkey, Cyprus, South Africa, Ukraine and Brunei – FC series)
    - SOHC iVTEC (Chain driven cam)
    - Compression: 10.7:1
    - Power: 125 PS (92 kW; 123 bhp) at 6,500 rpm
    - Torque: 15.6 kg⋅m (153 N⋅m; 113 lb⋅ft) at 4,300 rpm
    - Transmission: CVT-7, manual-5
    - Redline: 6700 rpm

== R18 ==
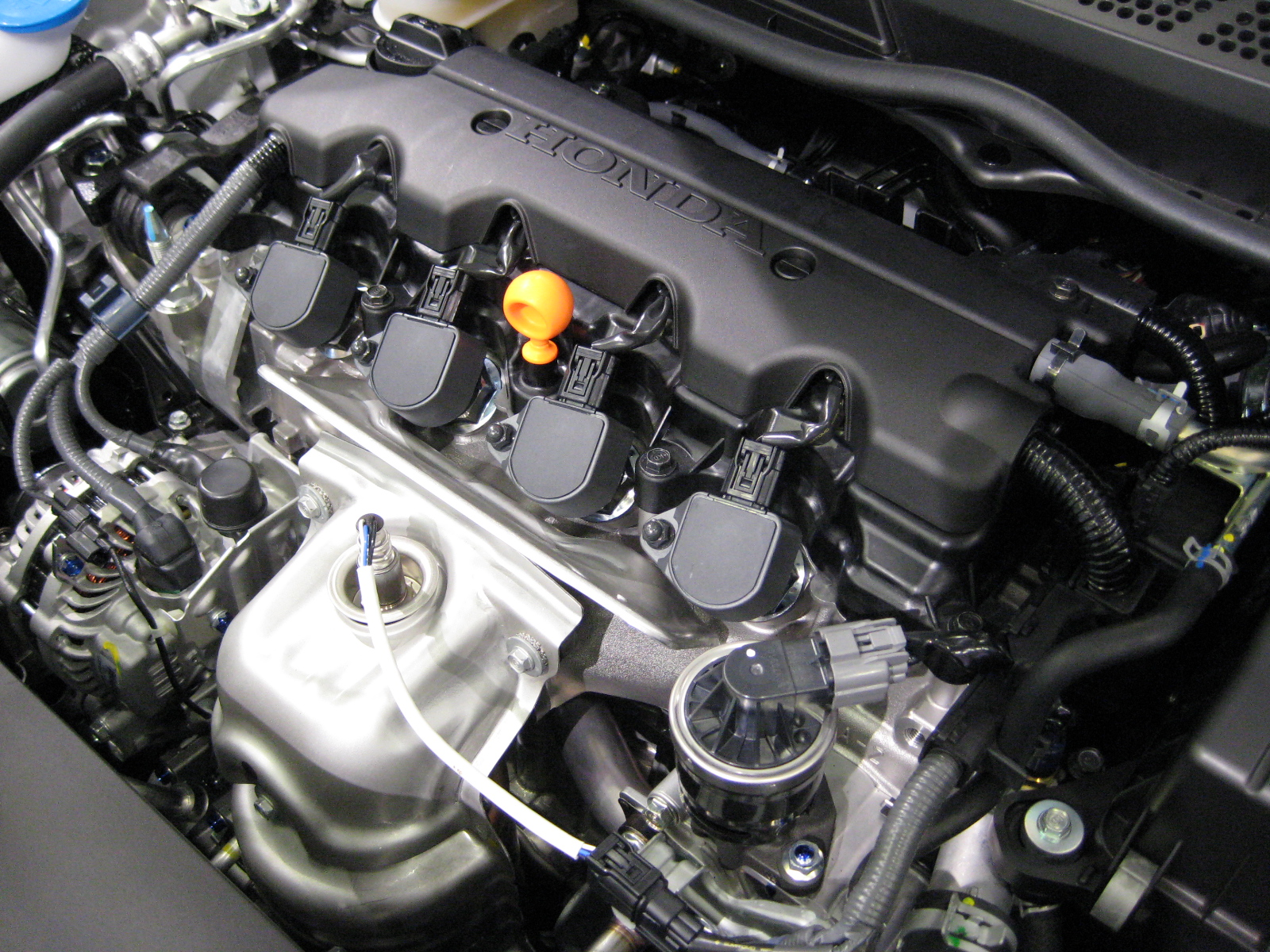
R18A

The R18 engines have a bore and stroke of 81 mm × 87.3 mm (3.19 in × 3.44 in), for an overall displacement of 1.8 L (1,799 cc; 109.8 cu in).

=== R18A1 ===
- Found in:
  - 2006–2011 Honda Civic (South Africa/Thailand/Malaysia/Indonesia/Philippines/Taiwan/Japan/Indian-market FD1, Brazil, American/Canadian-market FA1 & FG1)
  - 2007–2009 Honda FR-V (European-market BE1)
  - 2008–2015 Honda City
  - 2007–2014 Honda Stream
    - SOHC iVTEC (Chain driven cam)
    - Compression: 10.5:1
    - Power: 141 PS (104 kW; 139 bhp) at 6300 rpm (Japanese Spec)
    - 132 PS (97 kW; 130 bhp) on Indian variant to use lower octane fuel
    - Torque: 17.7 kg⋅m (174 N⋅m; 128 lb⋅ft) at 4,300 rpm
    - Fuel Cut Off: 7150 rpm
    - Redline: 6800 rpm

=== R18A2 ===
- Found in:
  - 2006–2011 Honda Civic (European-market FN1 & FK2)
    - Compression: 10.5:1
    - Power: 140 PS (103 kW; 138 hp) at 6,300 rpm
    - Torque: 17.7 kg⋅m (174 N⋅m; 128 lb⋅ft) at 4,300 rpm
    - cruising/economy happens during VTEC under cruising load only.
    - Redline: 6800 rpm
    - Fuel Cutoff : 7150 rpm

=== R18A6 ===
- Found in:
  - 2006–2011 Honda Civic (Brazil)
  - Local Fuel optimization (FlexFuel - Ethanol or Gasoline)
  - Power: 140 PS (103 kW; 138 hp)
  - SOHC i-VTEC (ECO Version)
  - Redline: 6800 rpm

=== R18Z1 ===
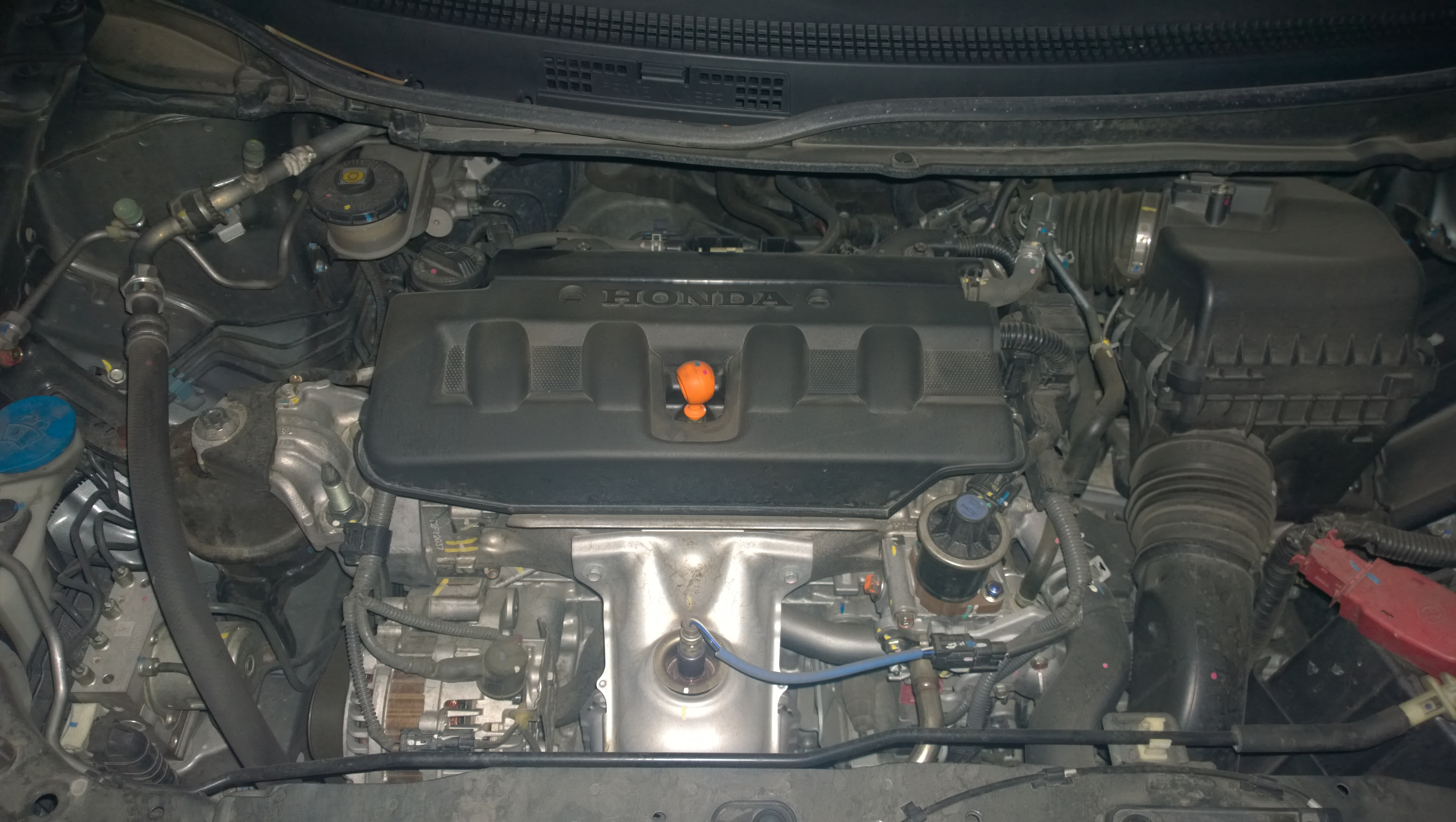
R18Z1 on Honda Civic FB2.

- Found in:
  - 2012–2015 Honda Civic (FB2, FG3)
  - 2016–2020 Honda Civic (FC6, FK5)
    - SOHC iVTEC (Chain driven cam)
    - Compression: 10.6:1
    - Power: 145 PS (107 kW; 143 hp) at 6,500 rpm
    - Torque: 17.8 kg⋅m (175 N⋅m; 129 lb⋅ft) at 4,300 rpm
    - Redline: 6800
    - Fuel cut off: 7100
    - Single valve mode at low RPMs
    - iVTEC engages economy cam profile from 1000 rpm to 3500 rpm, under light engine load. Engine runs on low power cam profile by default.

=== R18Z4 ===
- Found in:
  - 2012–2017 Honda Civic (European-market FK2)
    - Compression: 10.6:1
    - Power: 145 PS (107 kW; 143 hp) at 6,500 rpm
    - Torque: 17.8 kg⋅m (175 N⋅m; 129 lb⋅ft) at 4,300 rpm
    - Redline: 6800 rpm
    - Fuel cut off : 7100 rpm
    - cruising/economy happens during VTEC under cruising load only.
    - Balancer Shaft on this R18.

=== R18Z6 ===
- Found in:
  - 2013–2017 Honda Jade
    - SOHC iVTEC (Chain driven cam)
    - Compression: 10.6:1
    - Power: 141 PS (104 kW; 139 hp) at 6,500 rpm
    - Torque: 17.7 kg⋅m (174 N⋅m; 128 lb⋅ft) at 4,300 rpm

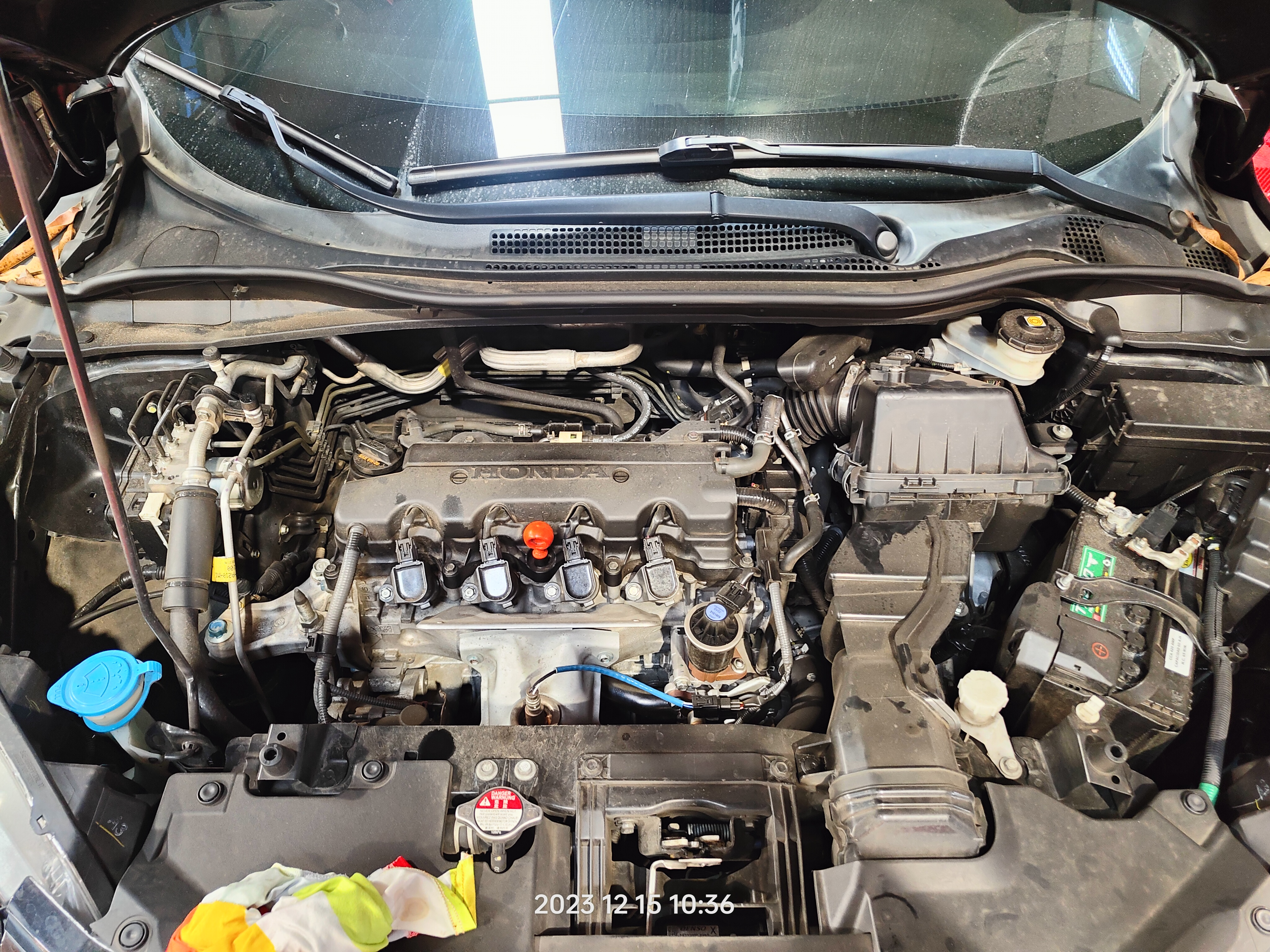
Honda HR-V Engine

=== R18Z9 ===
- Found in:
  - 2016–2022 Honda HR-V
    - Compression: 10.6:1
    - Power: 143 PS (105 kW; 141 hp) at 6,500 rpm
    - Torque: 17.7 kg⋅m (174 N⋅m; 128 lb⋅ft) at 4,300 rpm

=== R18ZC ===
- Found in:
  - 2016–2018 Honda HR-V (Brazil)

=== R18ZF ===
- Found in:
  - 2014–2022 Honda HR-V (Thailand and Indonesia)
    - Compression: 10.6:1
    - Power: 143 PS (105 kW; 141 hp) at 6,500 rpm
    - Torque: 17.5 kg⋅m (172 N⋅m; 127 lb⋅ft) at 4,300 rpm

== R20 ==
The R20 engines all have a bore and stroke of 81 mm × 96.9 mm (3.19 in × 3.81 in), for an overall displacement of 2.0 L (1,997 cc; 121.9 cu in).

=== R20A1 ===
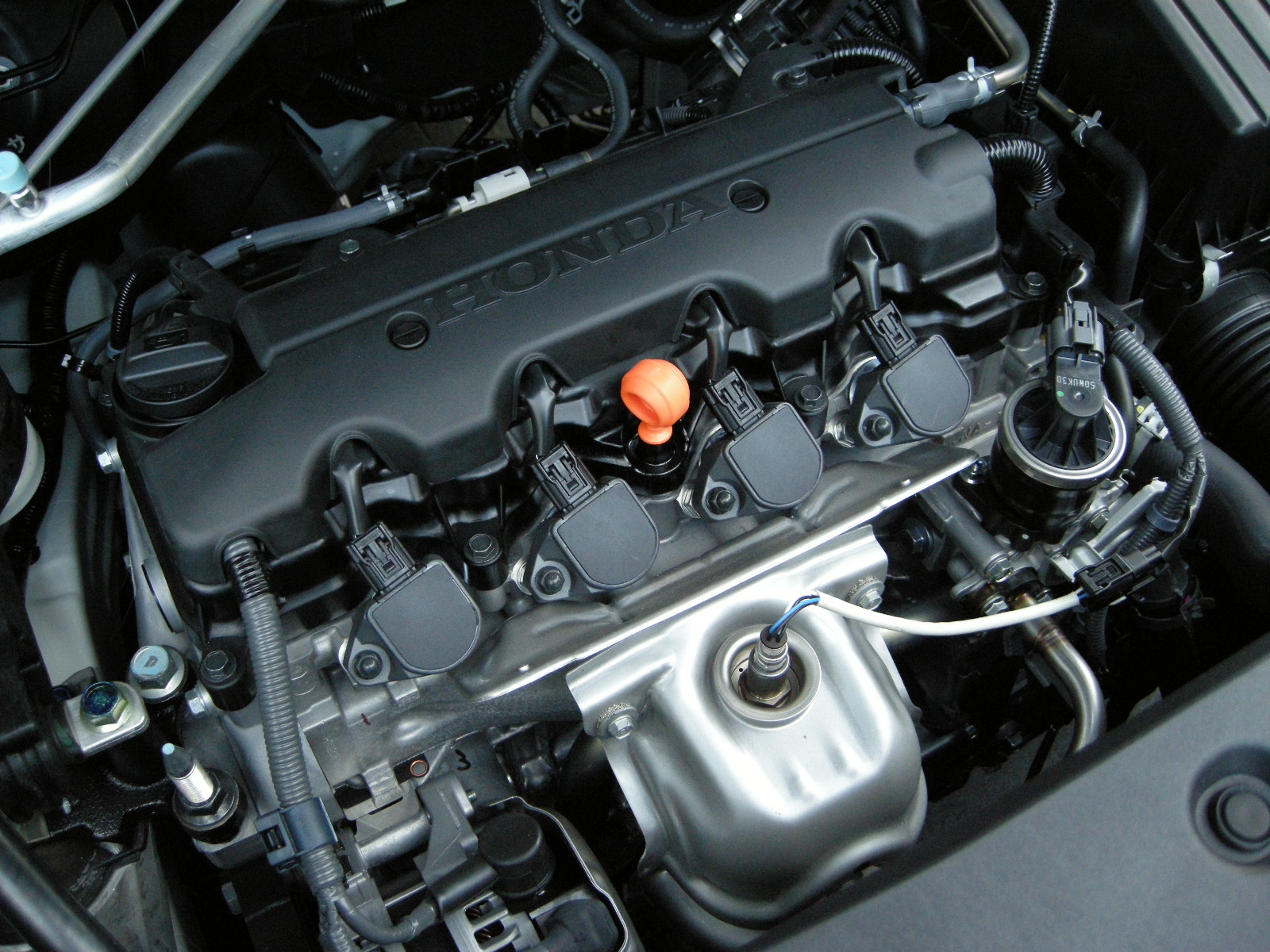
R20A

- Found in:
  - 2007–2011 Honda CR-V (RE1, RE2)
  - 2008 – Honda Stream (RSZ)
  - 2013–2015 Acura ILX (DE1)
    - Compression: 10.5:1
    - Power: 152 PS (112 kW; 150 bhp) at 6,200 rpm
    - Torque: 19.4 kg⋅m (190 N⋅m; 140 lb⋅ft) at 4,200 rpm
    - Redline: 6800 rpm
    - Fuel cut off: 7100 rpm
    - SOHC run by timing chain
    - iVTEC engages economy cam profile from 1000 rpm to 3500 rpm, under light engine load. Engine runs on power cam profile by default

=== R20A2 ===
- Found in:
  - 2007–2011 Honda CR-V (RE5)
    - Compression: 10.5:1
    - Power: 152 PS (112 kW; 150 bhp) at 6,200 rpm
    - Torque: 19.4 kg⋅m (190 N⋅m; 140 lb⋅ft) at 4,200 rpm

=== R20A3 ===
- Found in:
  - 2008–2012 Honda Accord (CP1) (156 hp)
  - 2008–2015 Honda Accord (CU1/CN1/CW1) (156 hp)
  - 2013–2020 Proton Perdana (CP3) (156 hp)
    - Compression: 10.5:1
    - Power: 157 PS (115 kW; 155 bhp) at 6,300 rpm
    - Torque: 19.2 kg⋅m (188 N⋅m; 139 lb⋅ft) at 4,300 rpm

=== R20A5 ===
- Found in:
  - 2012–2015 Honda Civic (Southeast Asian FB3)
    - Compression: 10.6:1
    - Power: 157 PS (115 kW; 155 bhp) at 6,500 rpm
    - Torque: 19.4 kg⋅m (190 N⋅m; 140 lb⋅ft) at 4,300 rpm

=== R20A6 ===
- Found in:
  - 2012–2016 – Honda CR-V (RM1, RM2)
    - Compression: 10.6:1
    - Power: 157 PS (115 kW; 155 bhp) at 6,500 rpm
    - Torque: 19.4 kg⋅m (190 N⋅m; 140 lb⋅ft) at 4,300 rpm

=== R20A9 ===
- Found in:
  - 2012–2016 – Honda CR-V (RE5)
    - Compression: 10.6:1
    - Power: 157 PS (115 kW; 155 bhp) at 6,500 rpm
    - Torque: 19.4 kg⋅m (190 N⋅m; 140 lb⋅ft) at 4,300 rpm

=== R20Z1 ===
- Found in:
  - 2012–2015 Honda Civic (FB3)
    - SOHC iVTEC (Chain driven cam)
    - Compression: 10.6:1
    - Power: 155 PS (114 kW; 153 bhp) at 6,500 rpm
    - Torque: 19.4 kg⋅m (190 N⋅m; 140 lb⋅ft) at 4,300 rpm

=== R20Z2/R20Z3 ===
- Found in:
  - 2013–2017 Honda Accord (CR1)
    - Compression: 10.6:1
    - Power: 155 PS (114 kW; 153 bhp) at 6,500 rpm
    - Torque: 19.4 kg⋅m (190 N⋅m; 140 lb⋅ft)

== LF (R20-based hybrid engine) ==
=== LFA1 (i-VTEC + Sport Hybrid i-MMD) ===
This version includes i-MMD ("Intelligent Multi Mode Drive").

- DOHC 16 valve
  - Displacement: 2.0 L; 121.6 cu in (1,993 cc)
  - Bore x Stroke: 81 mm × 96.7 mm (3.19 in × 3.81 in)
  - Power (Engine): 145 PS (107 kW; 143 hp) / 6,200 rpm
  - Torque (Engine): 175 N⋅m (129 lb⋅ft) / 3,500 rpm
  - Power (Motor): 184 PS (135 kW; 181 hp) / 5,000-6,000 rpm
  - Torque (Motor): 315 N⋅m (232 lb⋅ft) / 0–2,000 rpm
  - Power (Combined): 215 PS (158 kW; 212 hp) / 6,200 rpm
- Honda Odyssey Hybrid/e:HEV (Japan, RC4)
- Honda Stepwgn Hybrid/e:HEV (Japan, RP5)
- Honda Accord Hybrid (N. America) (2014 - 2022)
- Honda CR-V Hybrid (N. America) (2020 - 2022)
- Honda Spirior Hybrid (China) (2017)

=== LFB1 (i-VTEC + Sport Hybrid i-MMD) ===
This version includes i-MMD ("Intelligent Multi Mode Drive").

- DOHC 16 valve
  - Displacement: 2.0 L; 121.6 cu in (1,993 cc)
  - Bore x Stroke: 81 mm × 96.7 mm (3.19 in × 3.81 in)
  - Power (Engine): 145 PS (107 kW; 143 hp) / 6,200 rpm
  - Torque (Engine): 175 N⋅m (129 lb⋅ft) / 3,500 rpm
  - Power (Motor): 184 PS (135 kW; 181 hp) / 5,000-6,000 rpm
  - Torque (Motor): 315 N⋅m (232 lb⋅ft) / 0–2,000 rpm
  - Power (Combined): 215 PS (158 kW; 212 hp) / 6,200 rpm
- Honda Accord Hybrid (Thailand, CV3)
- Honda Odyssey e:HEV Absolute (International, RC4)

=== LFB-13 (i-VTEC + Sport Hybrid i-MMD, e:PHEV) ===
This version includes i-MMD ("Intelligent Multi Mode Drive").

- DOHC 16 valve
  - Displacement: 2.0 L; 121.6 cu in (1,993 cc)
  - Bore x Stroke: 81 mm × 96.7 mm (3.19 in × 3.81 in)
  - Power (Engine): 145 PS (107 kW; 143 hp) / 6,200 rpm
  - Torque (Engine): 175 N⋅m (129 lb⋅ft) / 3,500 rpm
  - Power (Motor): 184 PS (135 kW; 181 hp) / 5,000-6,000 rpm
  - Torque (Motor): 315 N⋅m (232 lb⋅ft) / 0–2,000 rpm
  - Power (Combined): 215 PS (158 kW; 212 hp) / 6,200 rpm
- Honda CR-V Sport Hybrid e+ (China)

=== LFB-H4 (i-VTEC + Sport Hybrid i-MMD) ===
This version includes i-MMD ("Intelligent Multi Mode Drive").

- DOHC 16 valve
  - Displacement: 2.0 L; 121.6 cu in (1,993 cc)
  - Bore x Stroke: 81 mm × 96.7 mm (3.19 in × 3.81 in)
  - Power (Engine): 145 PS (107 kW; 143 hp) / 6,200 rpm
  - Torque (Engine): 175 N⋅m (129 lb⋅ft) / 3,500 rpm
  - Power (Motor): 184 PS (135 kW; 181 hp) / 5,000–6,000 rpm
  - Torque (Motor): 315 N⋅m (232 lb⋅ft) / 0–2,000 rpm
  - Power (Combined): 215 PS (158 kW; 212 hp) / 6,200 rpm
- Honda Accord Hybrid/e:HEV (Japan, CV3)
- Honda CR-V Hybrid/e:HEV (Japan, RT5–RT6)
- Honda Odyssey Hybrid/e:HEV (Japan, RC4)

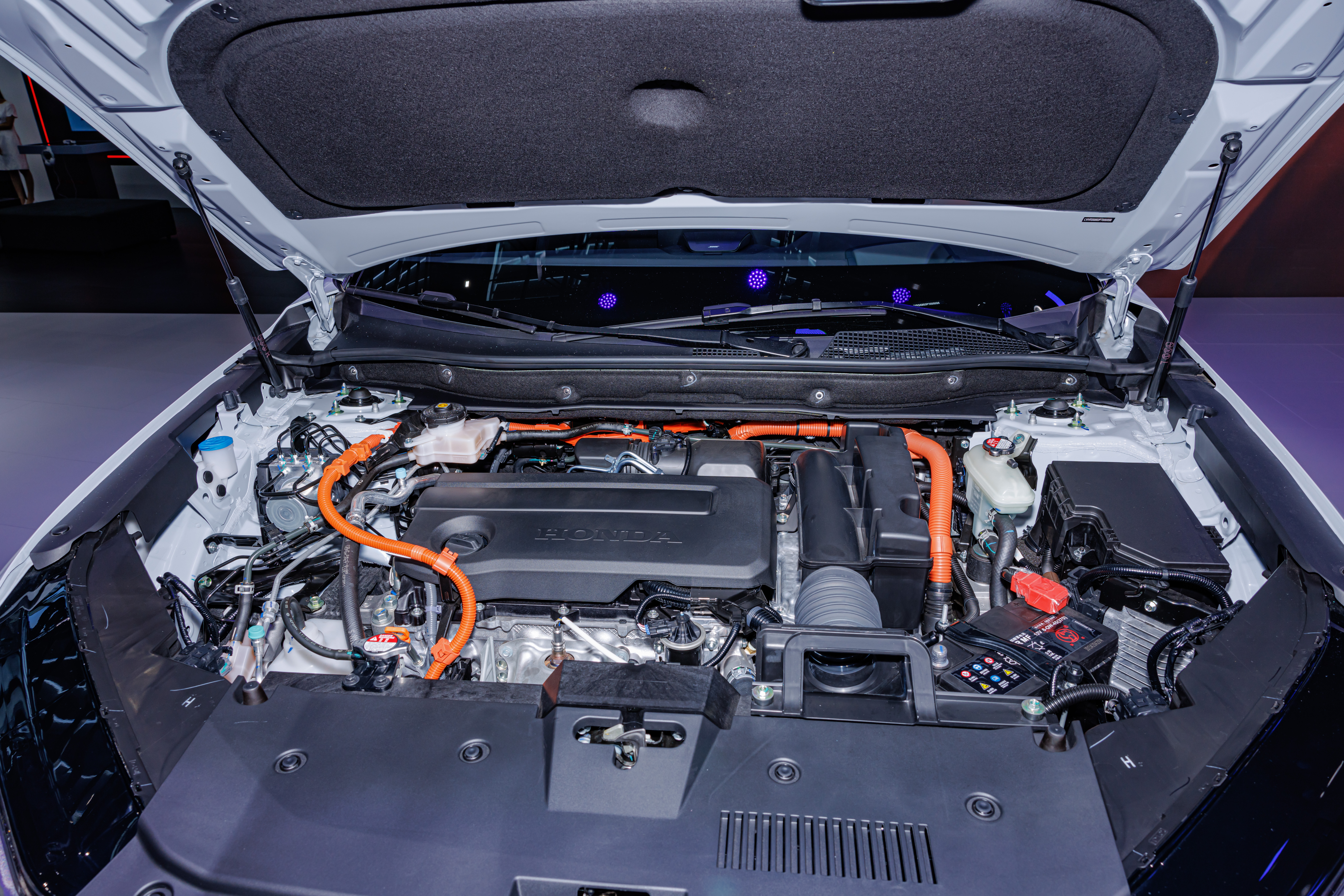
LFC1 Engine in a Honda CR-V e:HEV (RS, China)

=== LFC-H4 ===
- DOHC 16 valve
  - Displacement: 2.0 L; 121.6 cu in (1,993 cc)
  - Bore x Stroke: 81 mm × 96.7 mm (3.19 in × 3.81 in)
  - Power (Engine): 141 PS (104 kW; 139 hp) / 6,000 rpm
  - Torque (Engine): 182 N⋅m (134 lb⋅ft) / 4,500 rpm
  - Power (Motor): 184 PS (135 kW; 181 hp) / 5,000–6,000 rpm
  - Torque (Motor): 315 N⋅m (232 lb⋅ft) / 0–2,000 rpm
- Honda Civic e:HEV (Japan/Europe, FL4 Thailand/malaysia, FE4)
- Honda ZR-V e:HEV (Australia, RZ4/6)
- Honda CR-V e:HEV (Europe/China, RS)
- Honda Prelude e:HEV (BF1)

== See also ==
- Honda Engines
