= Streamer =

Streamer or streamers may refer to:

== Decorative and declarative ==
- Pennon, a small pointed flag
- Streamer, a kind of confetti consisting of strips of paper or other material
- Campaign streamer, flag used by military units
- Serpentine streamer, a party accessory often used as decoration

== Weather and atmospherics ==
- Streamer, a common name for a Lake-effect snow band
- Positive streamer, lightning bolt
- Streamer discharge, a type of electrical discharge
- Wingtip streamer, tubes of circulating air left behind a wing, also called wingtip vortices
- Helmet streamers and pseudostreamers, a bright loop-like structures found over an active regions on the Sun

== Arts and entertainment ==
- Online streamer, a person who streams on an online platform
- "Streamer", a song by Krokus from Metal Rendez-vous
- Streamers (play), a 1976 play by David Rabe
- Streamers (film), adaptation directed by Robert Altman

== Electronics and computing ==
- Streamer bass, a bass guitar produced by the German Warwick company
- A Digital media player, also called a "Media Streamer" or just a "Streamer"
- Streamer (software)
- Streamer (tape drive)
- Streaming media and over-the-top media service

== Other uses ==
- Streamer moth, the geometer moth Anticlea derivata
- Keitek Streamer, an Italian ultralight trike design
- Streamer fly, a type of artificial fly fishing lure, used in fly fishing
- Parachute streamer, a Model rocket parachute

== See also ==
- The Streamer Awards
- Stream (disambiguation)
