= Air mass (disambiguation) =

Air mass or airmass may refer to:

- Air mass (meteorology), a volume of air defined by its humidity and temperature
- Air mass (solar energy), pertaining to the air mass coefficient; the air in path of solar light through the atmosphere
- Airmass (astronomy), the mass of air in the path of observation
- Airmass (company), manufacturer of the Sunburst ultralight

== See also ==
- air column
- air current
- Airstream (disambiguation)
- Mass (disambiguation)
- Air (disambiguation)
