= Honda Stream =

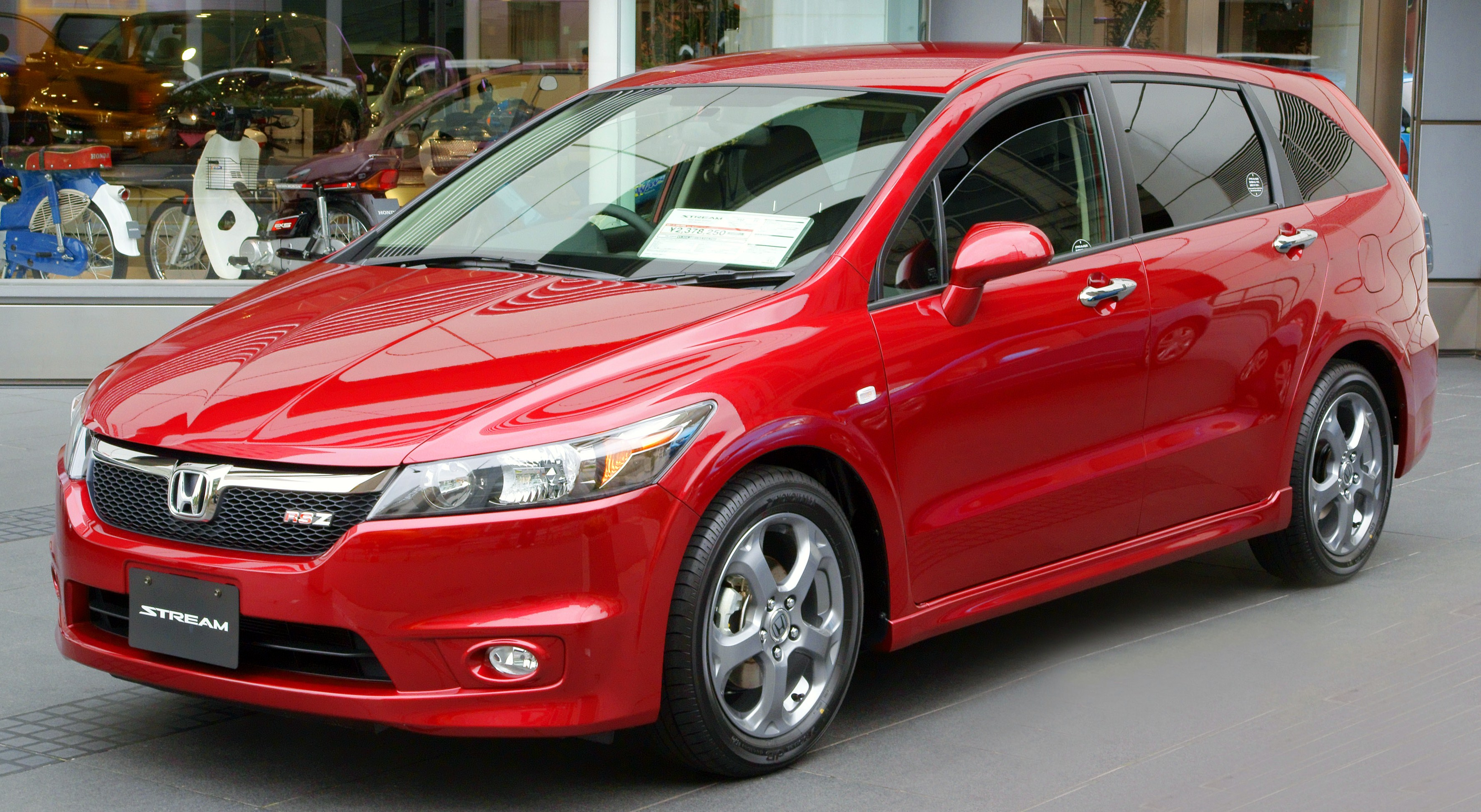
- 2006 Honda Stream RSZ (Japan)

Overview
- Manufacturer: Honda
- Production: 2000–2014

Body and chassis
- Class: Compact MPV
- Body style: 5-door station wagon
- Layout: Front-engine, front-wheel-drive Front engine, four-wheel-drive
- Related: Honda Civic; Honda Odyssey

Chronology
- Predecessor: Honda Orthia
- Successor: Honda Jade (Japan, China and Singapore)

The Honda Stream (Japanese: ホンダ・ストリーム) is a car manufactured by the Japanese automaker Honda from 2000 to 2014. The second generation model was officially presented on 13 July 2006. It has been described as a multi-purpose vehicle (MPV) or as an estate car.

== First generation (RN1–5; 2000) ==
First generation
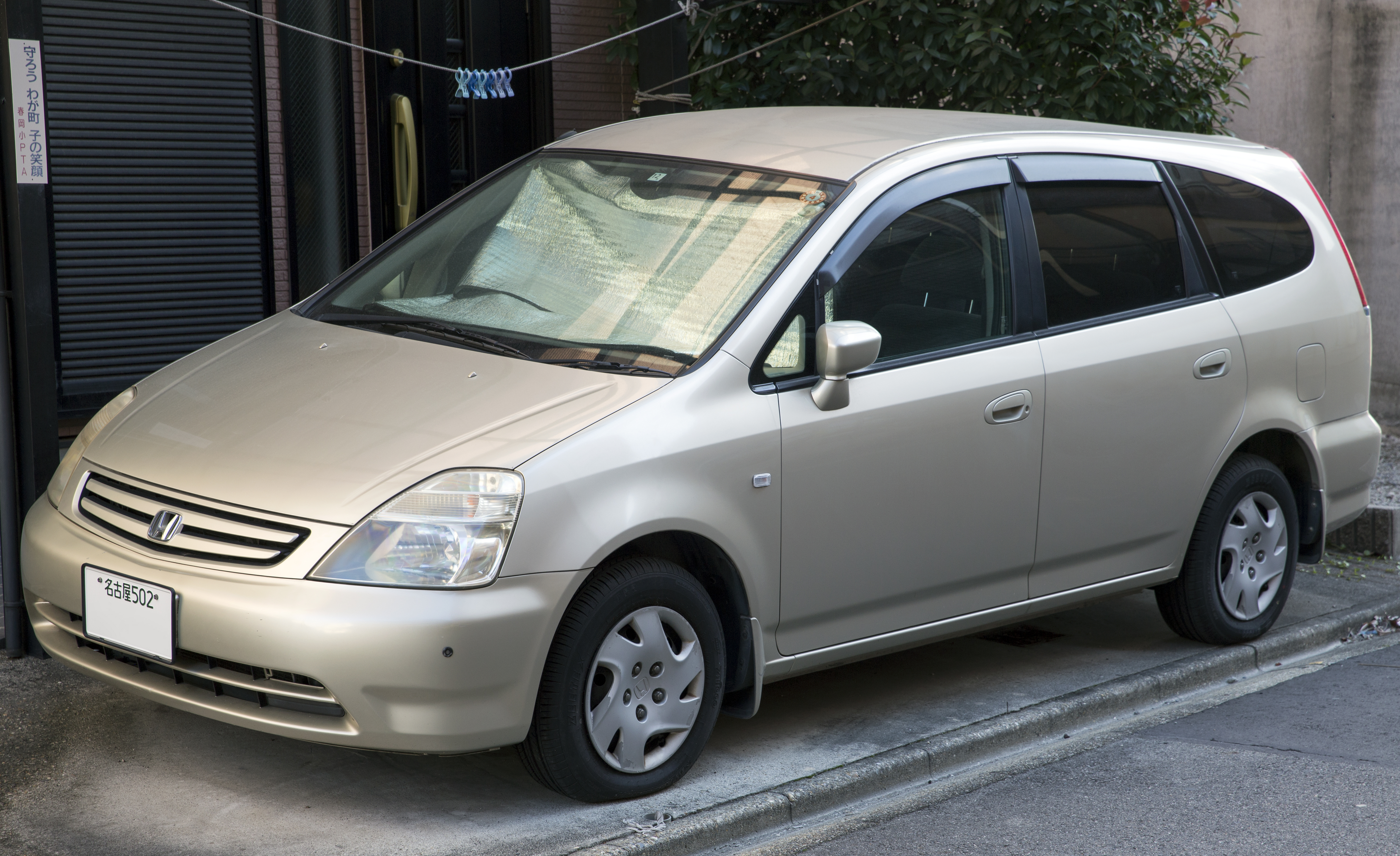
- 2000-2003 Honda Stream (Japan; pre-facelift)

Overview
- Model code: RN1/2/3/4/5
- Production: 2000–2006
- Assembly: Japan: Sayama, Saitama (Sayama Plant); Indonesia: Karawang, West Java (HPM; 2003–2006)

Body and chassis
- Related: Honda Civic (seventh generation)

Powertrain
- Engine: 1.7 L D17 VTEC I4 (RN1/2); 2.0 L K20A i-VTEC I4 (RN3/4); 2.0 L K20B i-VTEC I4 (RN5)
- Transmission: 5-speed manual 4/5-speed automatic

Dimensions
- Wheelbase: 2,720 mm (107.1 in)
- Length: 4,550 mm (179.1 in)
- Width: 1,695 mm (66.7 in)
- Height: 1,590 mm (62.6 in)

The first-generation Honda Stream went on sale in Japan on 27 October 2000, and in Europe in 2001. It was largely based on the Civic, with the same flat chassis but added 100 mm in length to accommodate the third row of seats. In advertising and promotional brochures Honda describes it as a sporty 7-seater.

The first-generation Honda Stream was available with a 1.7-litre D17 engine or the 2.0 K20A, matched to a 4-speed automatic transmission and a 5-speed automatic transmission with sequential mode, respectively. For some export markets, a manual version was also offered. At launch in Japan, the 1.7 (G, L) was available with a four-speed automatic and either front- or four-wheel drive, while the 2.0 (iL, iS) was only sold with front-wheel drive and a five-speed automatic. By January 2001, a four-wheel drive version of the larger engine (with a four-speed automatic) had been added. Power is 130 PS (96 kW) for the 1.7, while the 2.0 produces 154 PS (113 kW). For four-wheel drive versions, the 2.0 produces 158 PS (116 kW).

The first-generation Honda Stream received a facelift in September 2003. In December 2003, the Honda Stream Absolute debuted - this sportier looking variant was fitted with a direct injection 2.0 L K20B engine with improved fuel efficiency, coupled with CVT. The K20B was Honda's first lean-burn petrol engine using direct injection technology, it was only offered in Japan and received the RN5 model code. No other Honda vehicles were equipped with direct injection technology until the Earth Dreams engines were launched in 2012 in the United States. There was also a 1.7-liter version of the Stream Absolute; this variant did not receive any technical changes.

From 2004 onwards it was sold with six seats rather than seven in the British market.

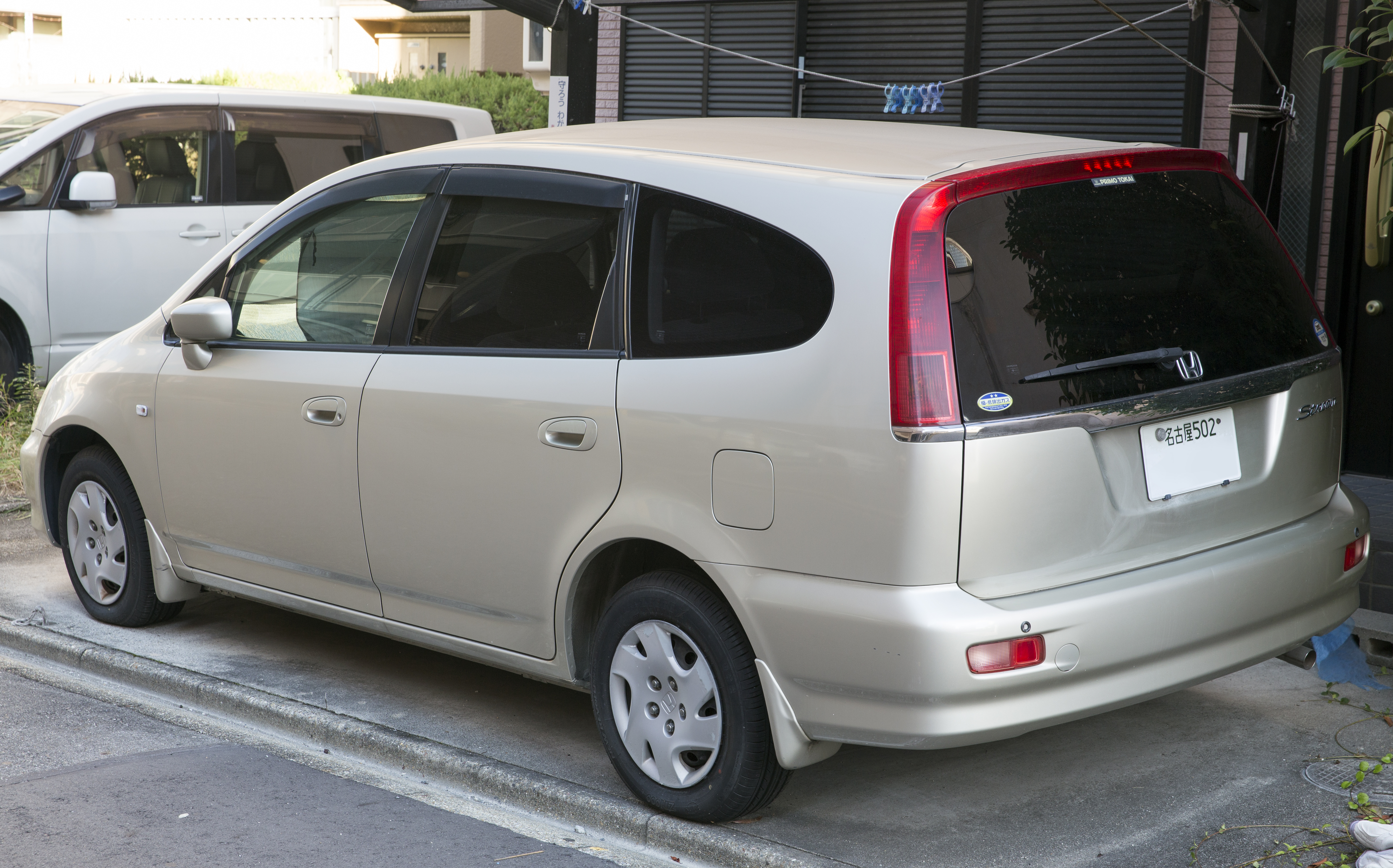
2000-2003 Honda Stream (Japan; pre-facelift)

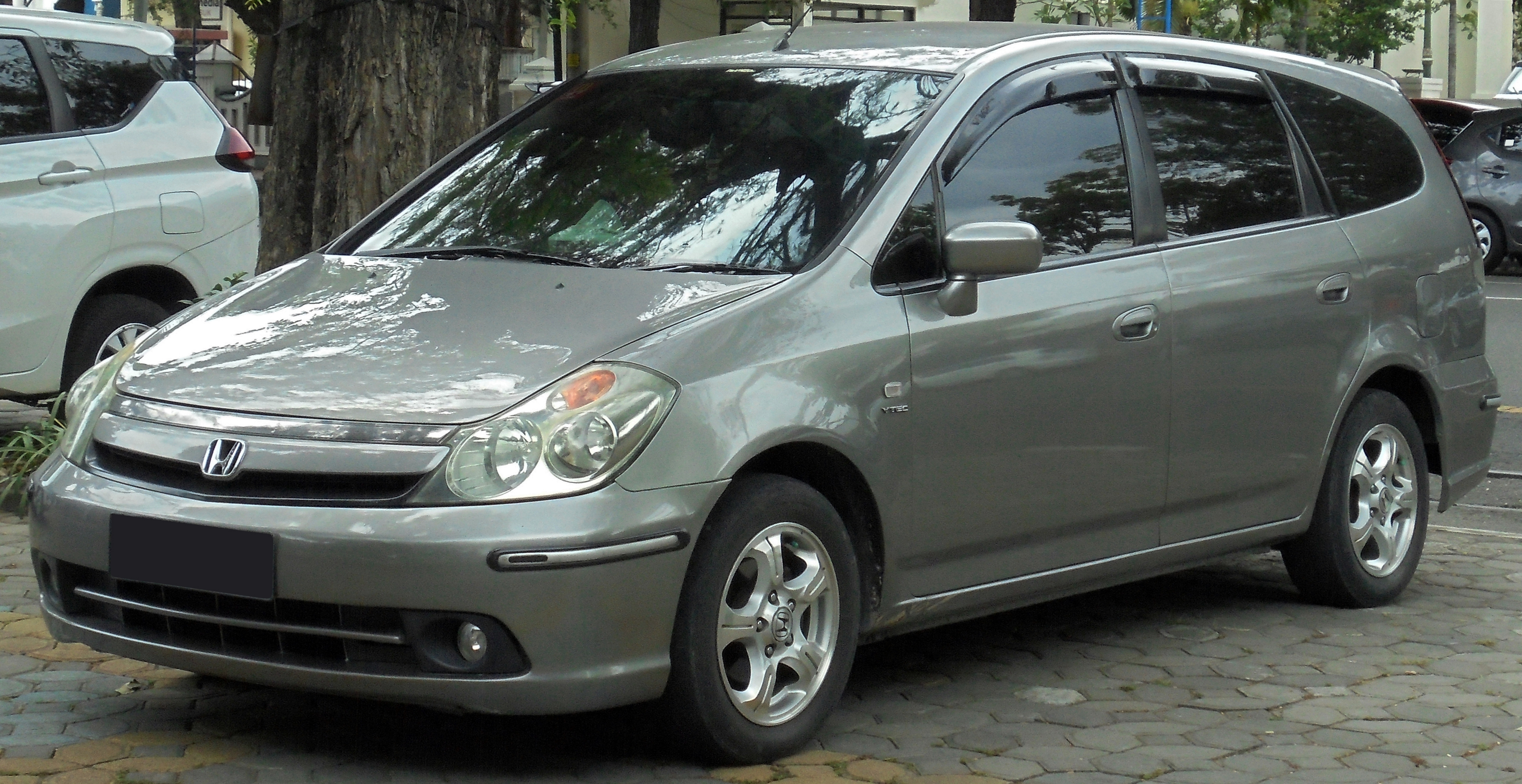
2003-2006 Honda Stream 1.7 (Indonesia; facelift)

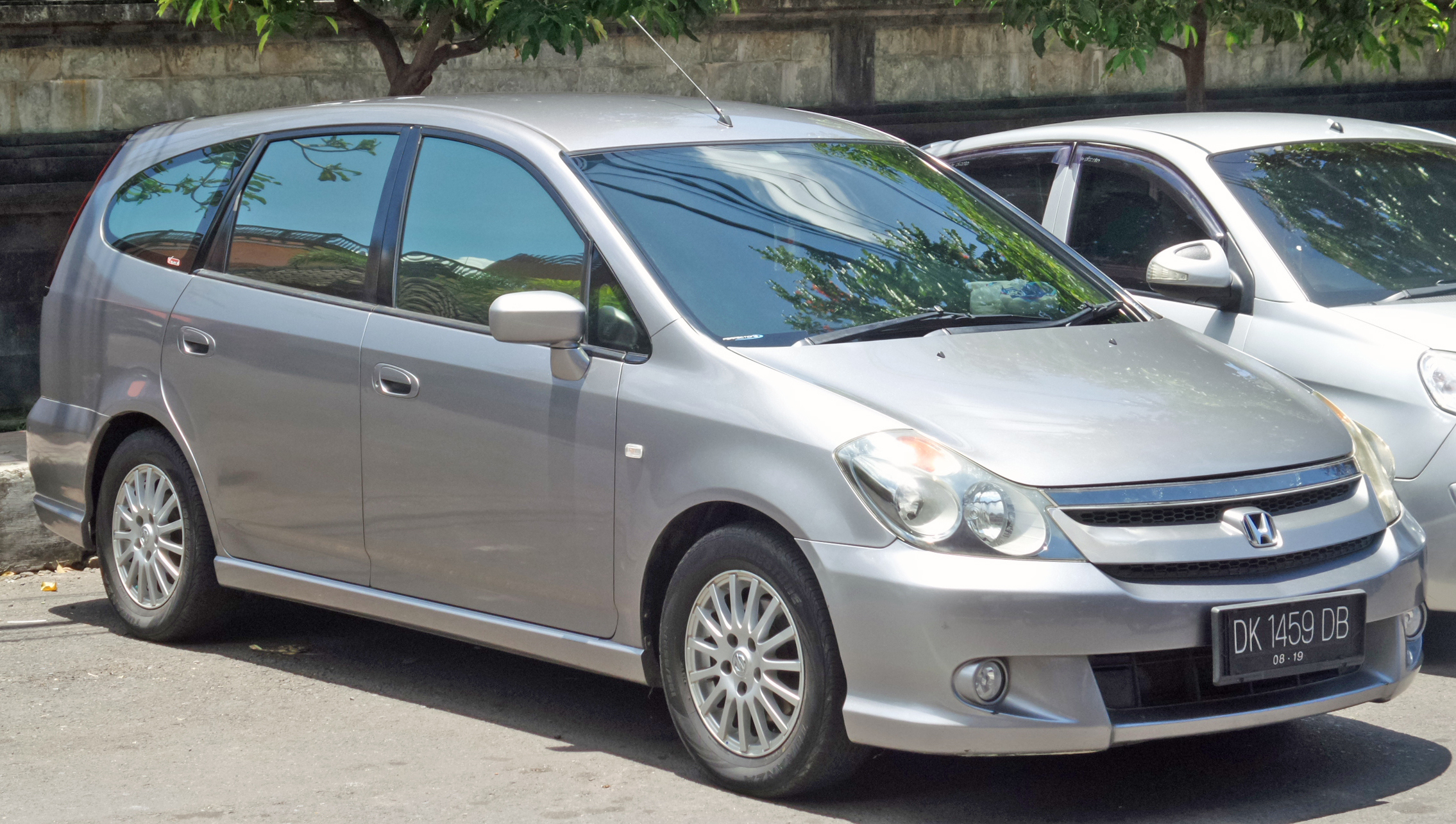
2003-2006 Honda Stream 2.0 (Indonesia; facelift)

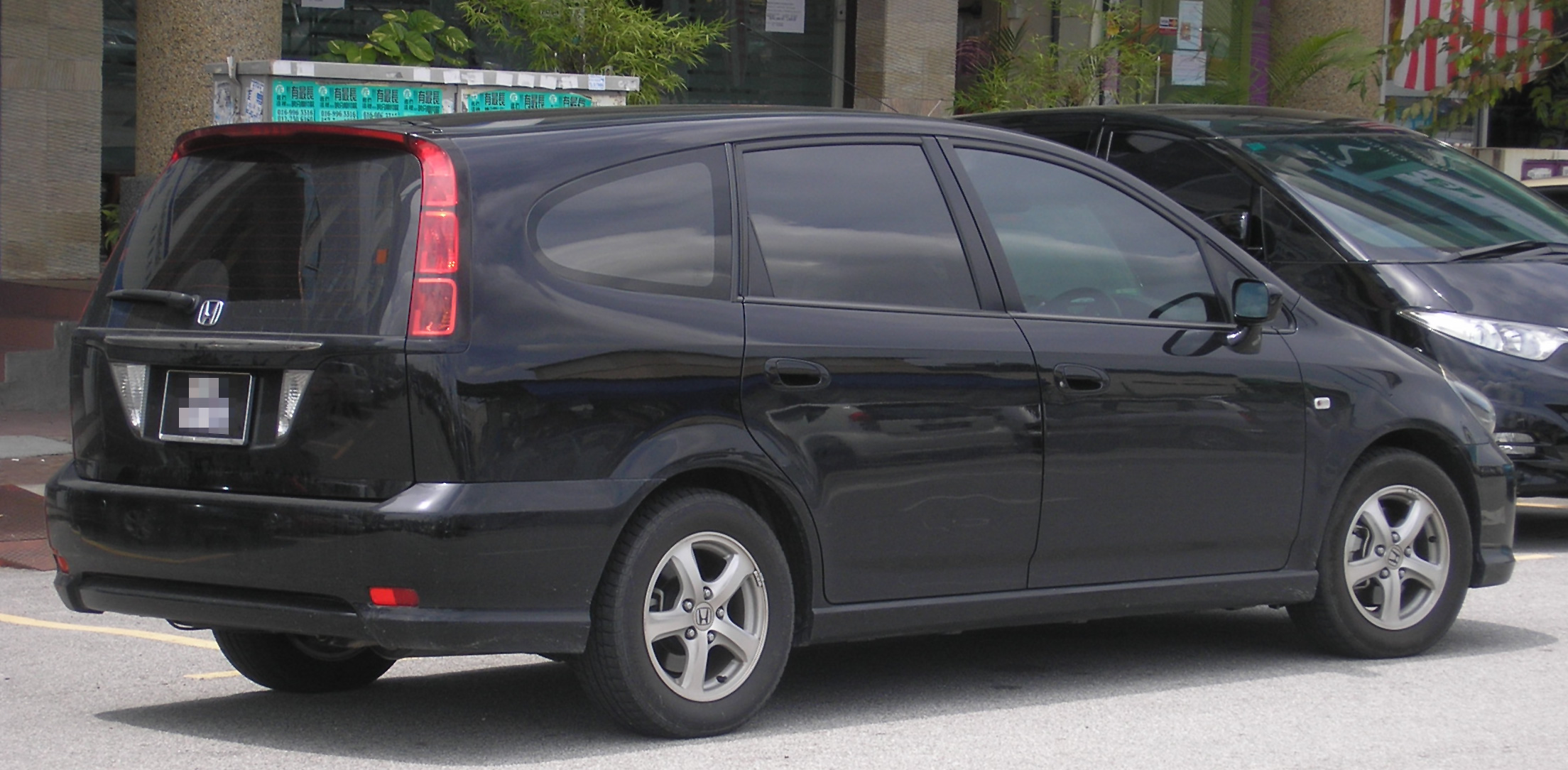
2003-2006 Honda Stream 2.0 (Malaysia; facelift)

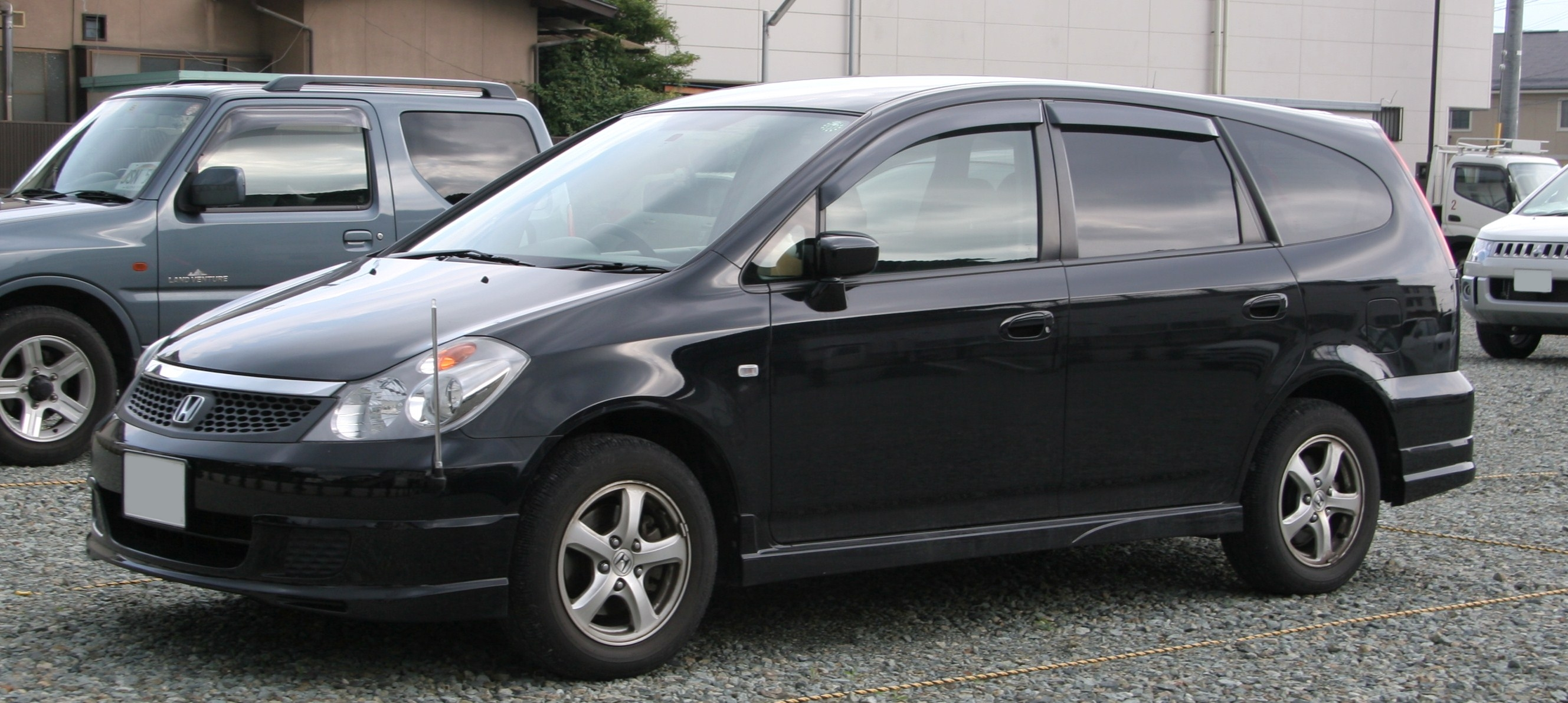
2003-2006 Honda Stream (Japan; facelift)

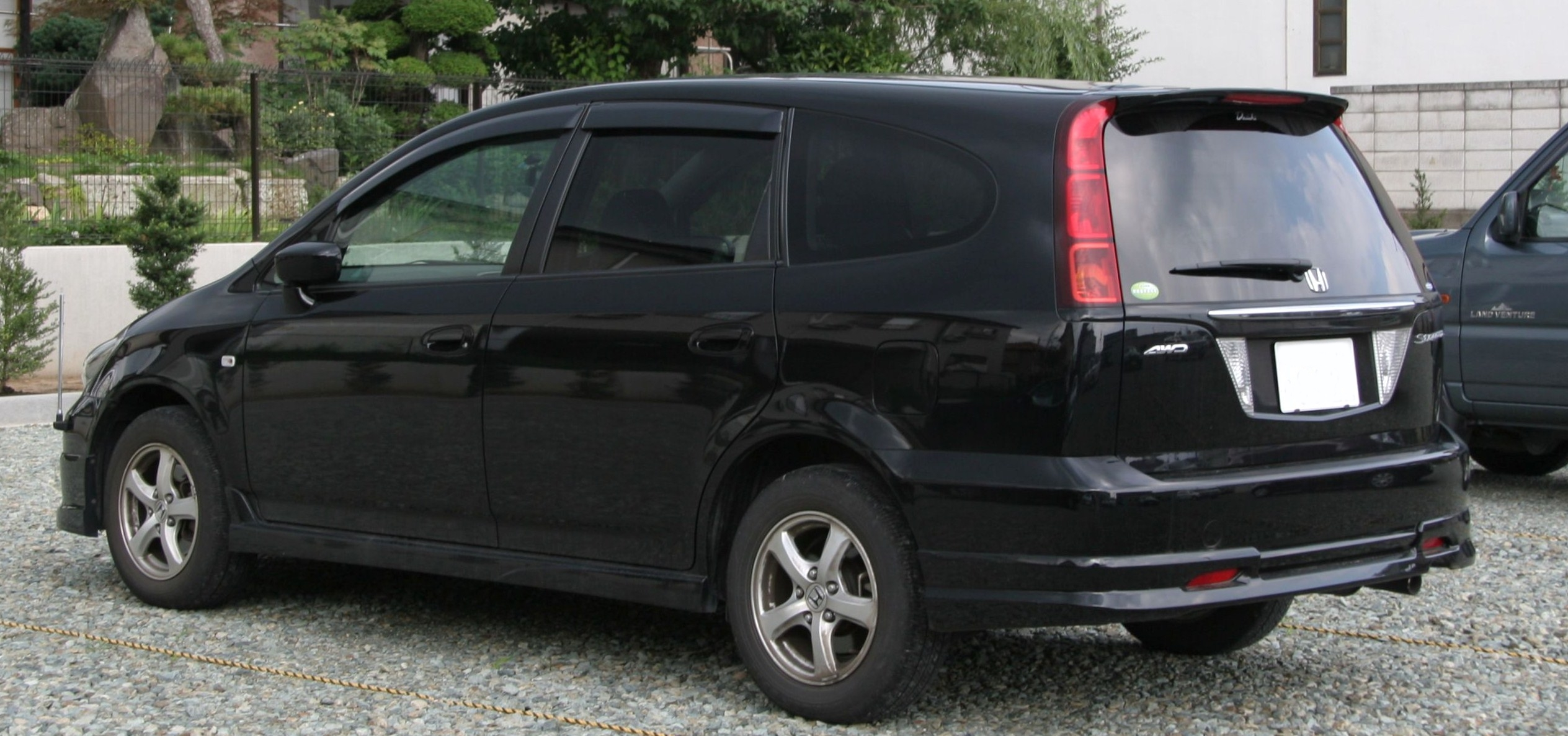
2003-2006 Honda Stream (Japan; facelift)

== Second generation (RN6–9; 2006) ==
Second generation
- 2006–2009 Honda Stream (Japan; pre-facelift)

Overview
- Model code: RN6/7/8/9
- Production: 2006–2014
- Assembly: Japan: Sayama, Saitama (Sayama Plant)

Body and chassis
- Related: Honda Civic (eighth generation)

Powertrain
- Engine: 1.8 L R18A i-VTEC I4; 2.0 L R20A i-VTEC I4
- Transmission: 5-speed automatic 5-speed manual CVT

Dimensions
- Wheelbase: 2,740 mm (107.9 in)
- Length: 4,575 mm (180.1 in)
- Width: 1,695 mm (66.7 in)
- Height: 1,540 mm (60.6 in)
- Curb weight: 1,358 kg (2,994 lb)

The second-generation Honda Stream is offered internationally in two specification levels. The lower-end spec features the R18A 1.8-liter SOHC i-VTEC (2-stage) engine with a 5-speed automatic gearbox (and a 5-speed manual transmission in some countries). The higher-end spec features the R20A 2.0-liter SOHC i-VTEC engine with variable length intake manifold, a CVT transmission and optional 7-speed paddle shift function for FWD models; or a 5-speed automatic transmission that comes with AWD models. The RSZ model also comes with firmer damping shock absorbers with anti-roll/sway bar for the rear setup.

Since April 2012, only the RSZ model was available. Honda stopped production of the Honda Stream in 2014 for the Japanese and Singaporean markets. It was still on sale in Malaysia until it was discontinued in that country in 2015. In Japan and Singapore, the Stream was replaced by the Honda Jade.

Honda Stream (Japan; pre-facelift)

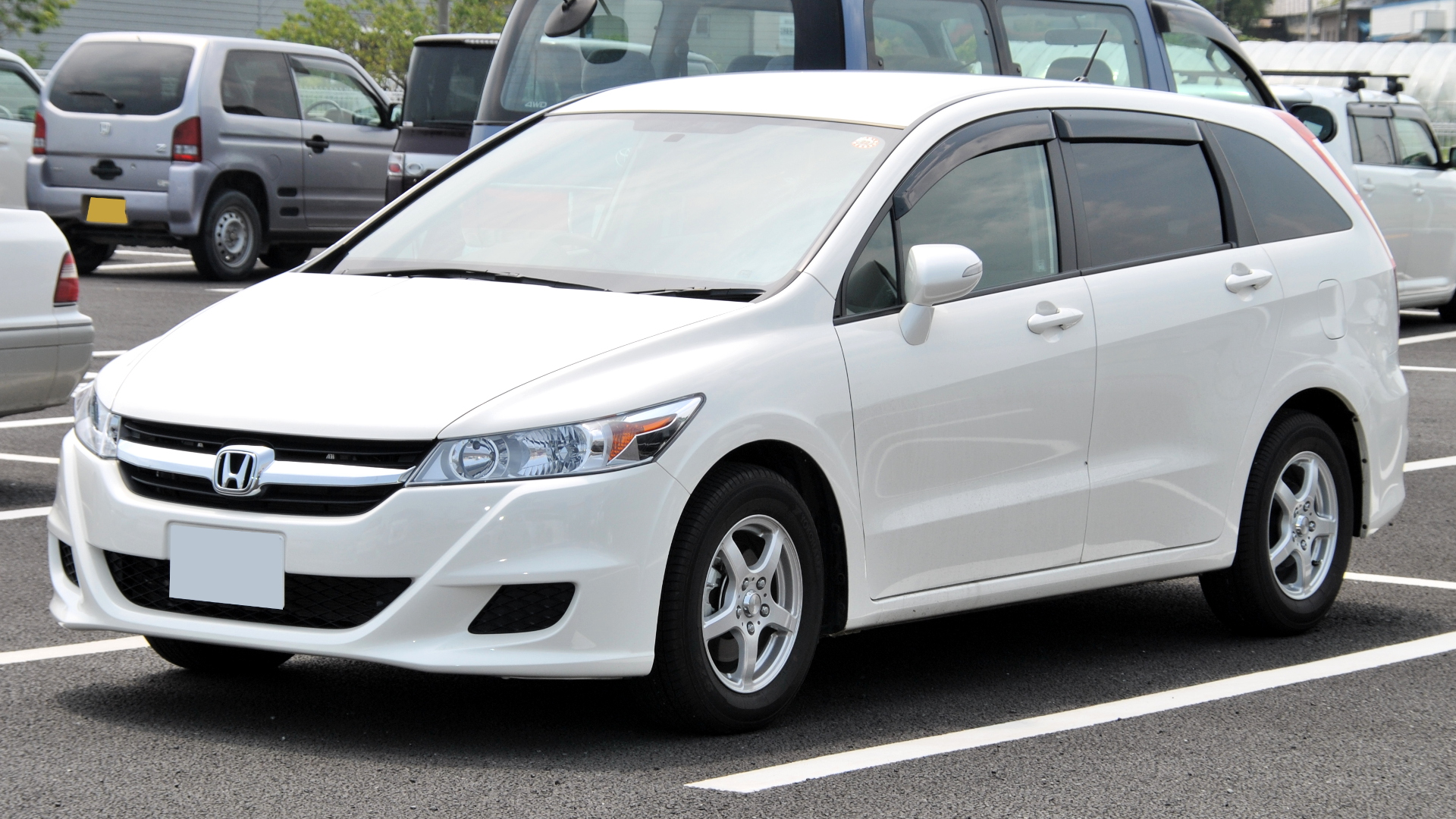
Honda Stream (Japan; facelift)

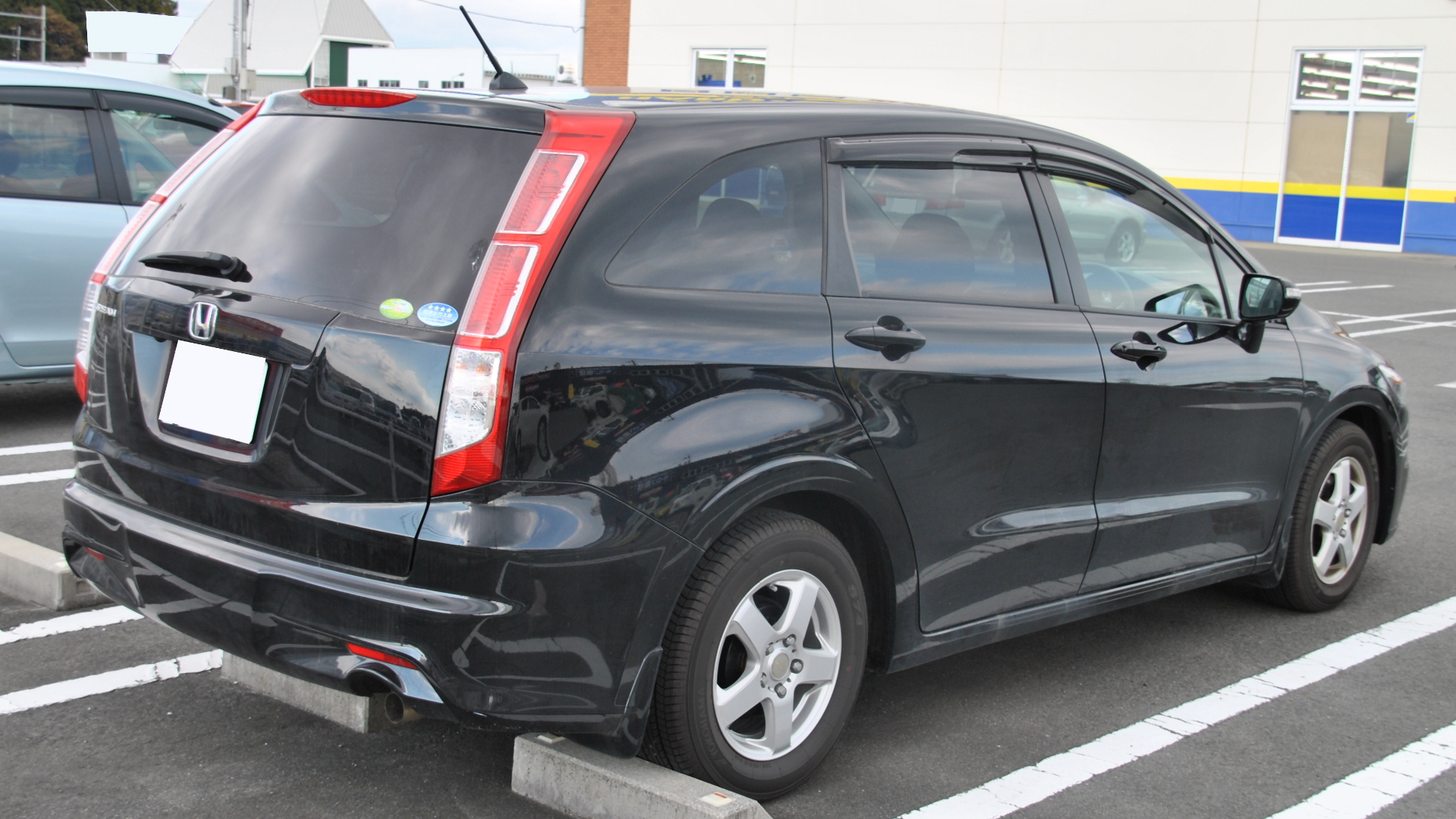
Honda Stream (Japan; facelift)

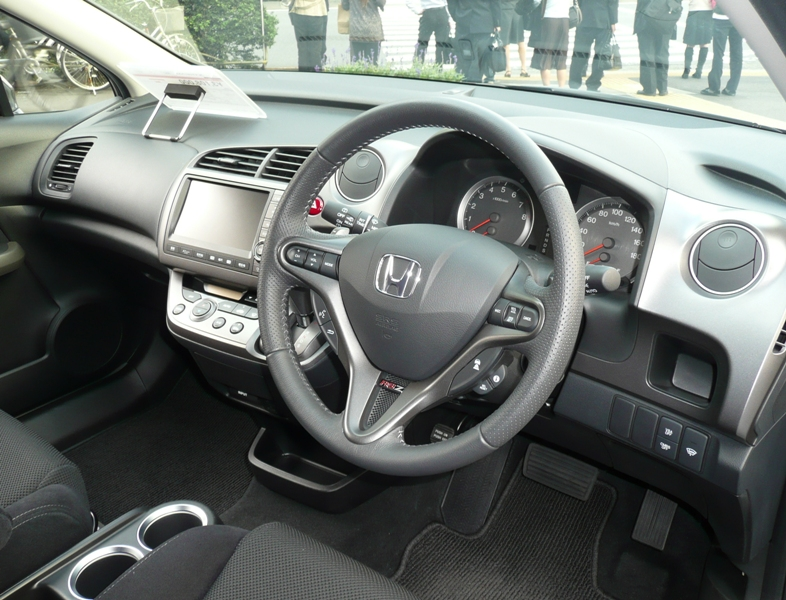
Interior

=== Malaysia ===
The Honda Stream was launched in November 2007, powered by a 1.8 L engine producing 140 PS (103 kW; 138 hp) at 6,300 rpm and 174 Nm of torque at 4,300 rpm and is mated to a 5-speed automatic gearbox, with fourth and fifth being overdrive gears for better highway fuel economy. In February 2009, Honda launched the RSZ variant joining the normal Stream.

=== Singapore ===
In Singapore, the Honda Stream is available through Kah Motor, Honda's authorised distributor in the region, and parallel import. The parallel import Stream was launched slightly earlier than from the authorised distributor. It was available in the standard 1.8 model and also the higher spec RSZ model. Only 1 RST model was ever registered in 2010.

=== Stream RST (2009-2012) & TS (2010-2012) ===
In some countries, this variant of the Stream has only 2 rows of seats (6 seats). For the RST model, a combination of the removal of the third row seat (in some countries) and adoption of lightweight 17-inch alloy wheels reduces weight and improves handling and acceleration; the handling is further enhanced by suspension tuning, and a tailgate spoiler is also added.

=== Stream ZS (2009-2012) ===
A ZS model available only in FWD was added in September 2009.

=== Body style ===
Chassis codes	(DBA-)RN6	(DBA-)RN7	(DBA-)RN8	(DBA-)RN9
Engine	R18A	R18A	R20A	R20A
Drive	FWD	AWD	FWD	AWD
Japan models	Years			
X (7-passenger)	2006-2012	2006-2012	-	-
G (7-passenger)	-	-	2006–2009	2006–2009
Gi (7-passenger)	-	-	2009-2012	-
ZS (7-passenger)	2009-2012	-	2009-2012	-
RSZ (7→6-passenger)	2006-2014	2006-2014	2006-2014	2006-2014
TS (5-passenger)	2010-2012	-	2010-2012	-
RST (5-passenger)	2009-2012	-	2009-2012	-

=== Engines ===
Model	Type	Power, torque at rpm
R18A	1,799 cc (1.8 L; 109.8 cu in) I4	140 PS (103 kW; 138 hp) at 6300, 174 N⋅m (128 lb⋅ft) at 4300
R20A	1,997 cc (2.0 L; 121.9 cu in) I4	150 PS (110 kW; 148 hp) at 6200, 190 N⋅m (140 lb⋅ft) at 4200

=== Transmissions ===
Model	Type
1.8L X (FWD & AWD), ZS, TS	5-speed automatic
1.8L RSZ (FWD & AWD), RST	5-speed automatic with paddle shift
2.0L Gi, ZS, TS	CVT
2.0L RSZ (FWD), RST	CVT with paddle shift
2.0L RSZ (AWD)	5-speed automatic with paddle shift
