= Stream (disambiguation) =

A stream is a body of moving water.

Stream or streaming may also refer to:

== Arts, entertainment, and media ==
=== Films ===
- Stream (film), a 2024 American horror film
- Stream, a 2008 film featuring Whoopi Goldberg
- The Stream (1922 film), a 1922 German silent film
- The Stream (1938 film), a French drama film directed by Maurice Lehmann and Claude Autant-Lara

=== Music ===
==== Albums ====
- Stream (album), a 1995 album by Fischer-Z
- Streaming (album), a 2006 album by Muhal Richard Abrams, George Lewis and Roscoe Mitchell
- Streams (1999 album), an album of Christian music by various artists
- Streams (Sam Rivers album), 1973
- Streams (Yuma Uesaka and Marilyn Crispell album), 2021
- Streams, a 2007 album by Ferenc Snétberger and Markus Stockhausen
- Stream, a 2024 album by Fergus McCreadie

==== Songs ====
- "Stream", a 1997 song by Forest for the Trees from Forest for the Trees
- "Stream", a 2015 song by Last Dinosaurs from Wellness
- "Stream", a 1992 song by Moby from Moby
- "Stream", a 1997 song by the Third and the Mortal from In This Room
- "Streaming", a 2006 song by Muhal Richard Abrams, George Lewis, and Roscoe Mitchell off the album of the same name

=== Television ===
- Stream TV, an Italian television company
- The Stream (TV series), a Norwegian reality singing competition
- The Stream (Al Jazeera English), a daily television programme on Al Jazeera English

== Brands and enterprises ==
- Honda Stream, a car
- Microsoft Stream, a corporate video-sharing service
- Stream Energy, an American home services company
- Stream Global Services, an outsourcing company
- Stream unconference, a participant-driven technology meeting

== Computing and technology ==
- Data stream, a sequence of signals in connection-oriented communication
- Stream (computing), a sequence of data elements made available over time
  - Stream (abstract data type), a kind of data type
- Streamlet (scientific visualization), a graphical representation of flows
- Standard streams, preconnected input and output streams for computer programs
- Stream processing, a computer programming paradigm
- Streaming media, multimedia streamed to an end-user
  - .stream, a generic top-level domain intended for streaming media sites
  - Live streaming, media broadcast in real-time to the viewer
- Streaming services, list of subscription-based streaming platforms
- STREAM, a memory bandwidth measurement convention, and a benchmark
- STREAMS, a Unix System V framework

== Other uses ==
- Streaming (education), grouping students by academic ability
- Precious metals streaming, a business model

== See also ==
- Stream of consciousness (narrative mode)
- Streamer (disambiguation)
- Stream of particles
