= Honda Civic (eleventh generation) =

Eleventh generation of the Honda Civic

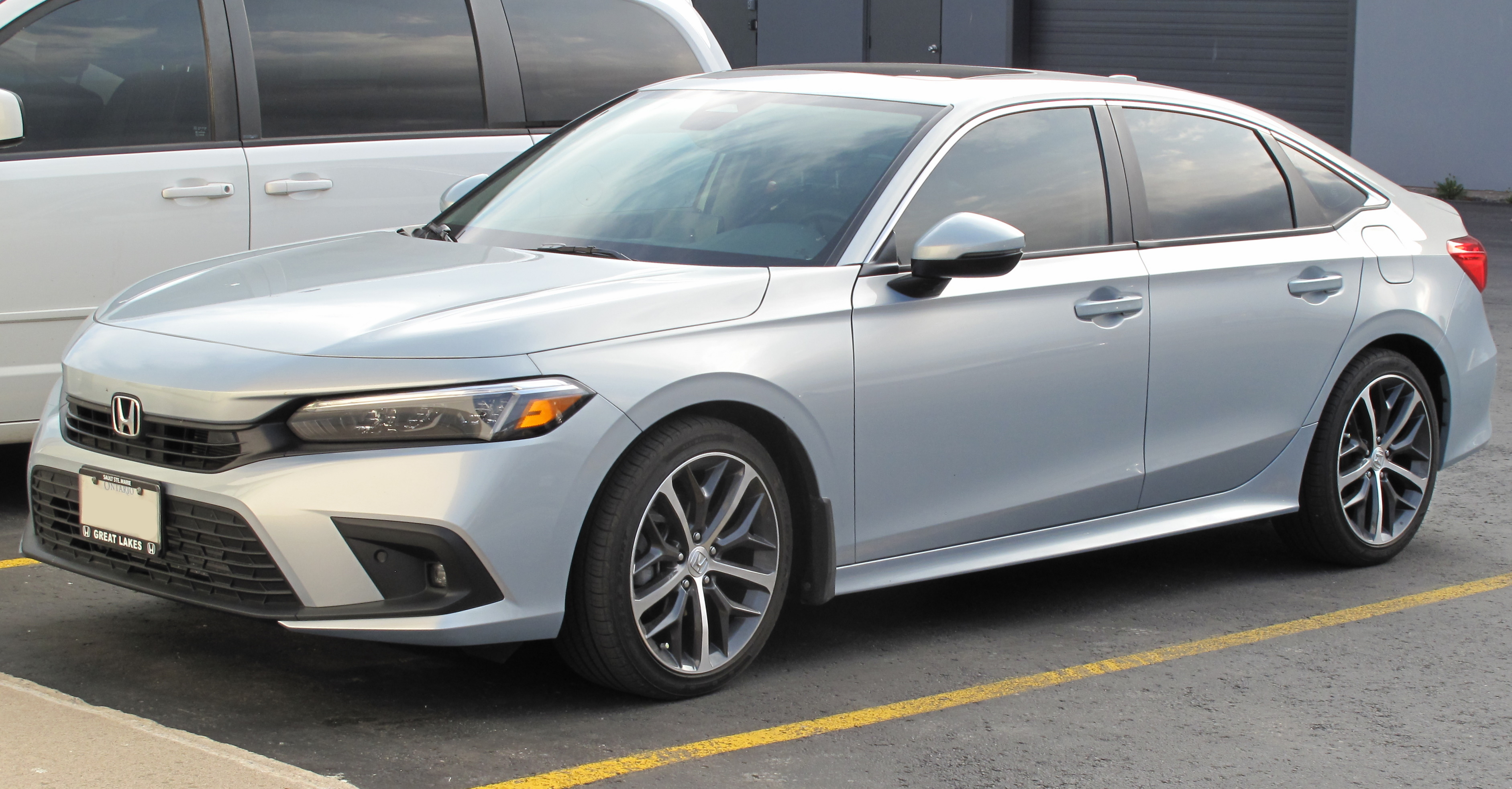
- 2022 Honda Civic Touring sedan (Canada)

Overview
- Manufacturer: Honda
- Model code: FE1; FE2; FE4 (sedan); FL1; FL2; FL4 (liftback); FL5 (Type R)
- Also called: Honda Integra (China)
- Production: 2021–present
- Model years: 2022–present
- Assembly: Japan: Yorii, Saitama (Europe and Turkey liftback); Canada: Alliston, Ontario (HCM, North America sedan); United States: Greensburg, Indiana (HMIN, North America liftback); China: Wuhan (Dongfeng Honda); Guangzhou (GAC Honda, Integra); Pakistan: Lahore (Honda Atlas, Asia sedan); Thailand: Prachinburi (Europe and Turkey sedan); Malaysia: Alor Gajah, Melaka (Africa sedan)
- Designer: Yuki Ishii and Hitomaro Asano

Body and chassis
- Class: Compact car (C)
- Body style: 4-door sedan (FE); 5-door liftback (FL)
- Layout: Front-engine, front-wheel-drive
- Platform: Honda Architecture (HA)
- Related: Acura Integra (2023); Honda ZR-V/HR-V (RZ); Acura ADX; Honda CR-V (sixth generation); Honda Prelude (BF1); Mitsuoka M55

Powertrain
- Engine: Petrol: 1.5 L L15B7 DOHC VTEC turbo I4; 1.5 L L15BG FFV VTEC turbo I4; 1.5 L L15BJ VTEC I4; 1.5 L L15C VTEC turbo I4; 1.5 L L15CA VTEC turbo I4 (Civic Si); 2.0 L K20C2 i-VTEC I4 (2022–2024); 2.0 L K20C9 Atkinson I4 (2025–); Petrol hybrid: 2.0 L LFC I4 (e:HEV)
- Electric motor: 2x permanent magnet motors (e:HEV)
- Transmission: CVT; 6-speed manual eCVT
- Hybrid drivetrain: Power-split hybrid (e:HEV)
- Battery: Lithium-ion (e:HEV)

Dimensions
- Wheelbase: 2,736 mm (107.7 in)
- Length: 4,674 mm (184.0 in) (sedan); 4,549 mm (179.1 in) (liftback)
- Width: 1,801 mm (70.9 in)
- Height: 1,410–1,415 mm (55.5–55.7 in)
- Curb weight: 1,305–1,460 kg (2,877–3,218 lb)

Chronology
- Predecessor: Honda Civic (tenth generation); Honda Insight (third generation) (for hybrid)

The eleventh-generation Honda Civic (FE/FL) is a compact car (C-segment) manufactured by Honda since 2021, replacing the tenth-generation Civic. It was launched in the North American market in June 2021, in Southeast Asia in August, Japan and China in September, and Australia and New Zealand in December. It was launched in Pakistan in March 2022, followed by Europe in late 2022. The liftback variation (marketed as "Civic Hatchback") was unveiled on 23 June 2021, for North America and Japan. This generation is also the first Civic since the second-generation not to offer a two-door version (whether three-door hatchback or two-door coupe) due to declining sales.

== Development ==
Development of the eleventh-generation Civic was led by large project leader Tomoyuki Yamagami. Honda has referred to the design approach of the model as "Man-Maximum, Machine-Minimum".

Honda moved the bottom of the windshield pillars rearward by 1.96 in (50 mm), which elongates its hood for styling considerations. The model also adopts low beltline, and door-mounted side mirrors previously adopted by the eighth and ninth-generation Civic to improve visibility.

The body structure received an 8 percent improvement of torsional rigidity and 13 percent improvement of bending rigidity compared to the previous generation, which supports improvements in ride, handling and NVH. The suspension setup had been tuned to take maximum advantage of the stiffer body structure and additional 1.4 in (36 mm) of wheelbase for an improved ride quality.

For this generation, the Civic Hatchback features a fastback, "coupe-inspired" profile similar to liftbacks. Compared to the sedan model, Honda shortened the rear overhang by 124 mm (4.9 in), while keeping the same wheelbase length and rear doors.

Alongside Yorii, Japan, the Civic Hatchback is produced in the U.S. at the Greensburg, Indiana plant, the latter being the first time that a Civic Hatchback has been built in the U.S. (although other Civic body styles have been built in the U.S. since 1986).

=== Liftback ===
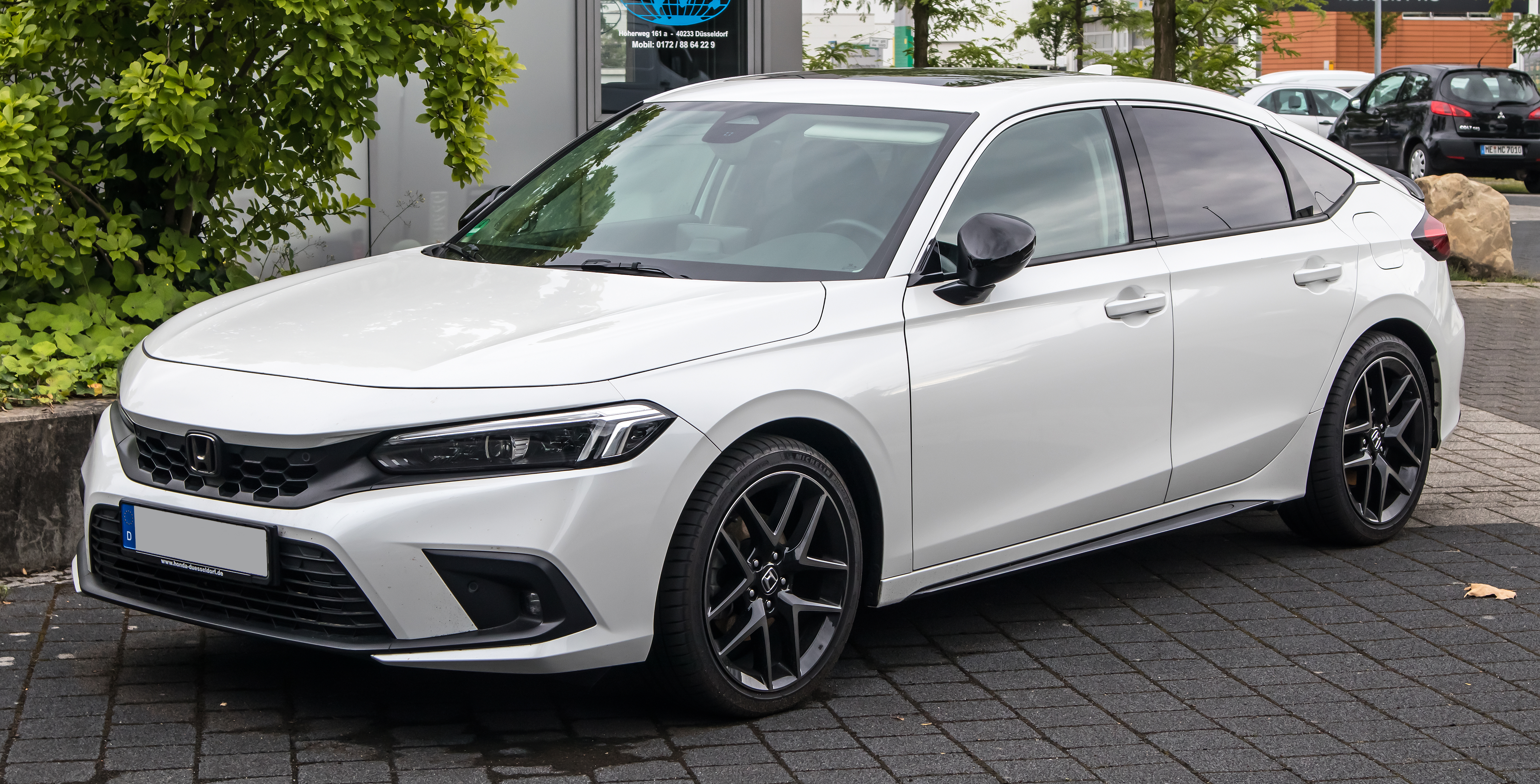
Civic liftback (pre-facelift)

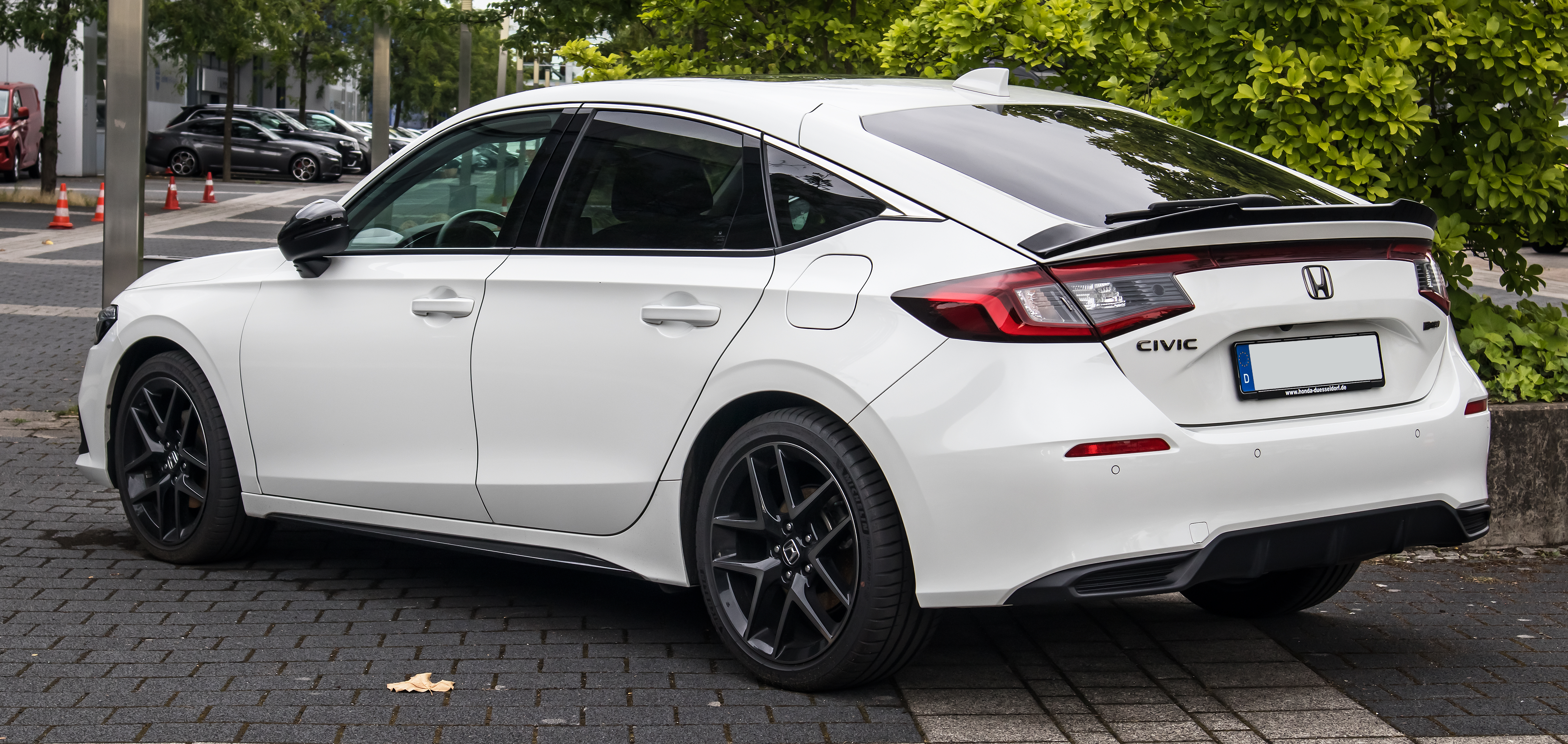
Civic liftback (pre-facelift)

=== Sedan ===
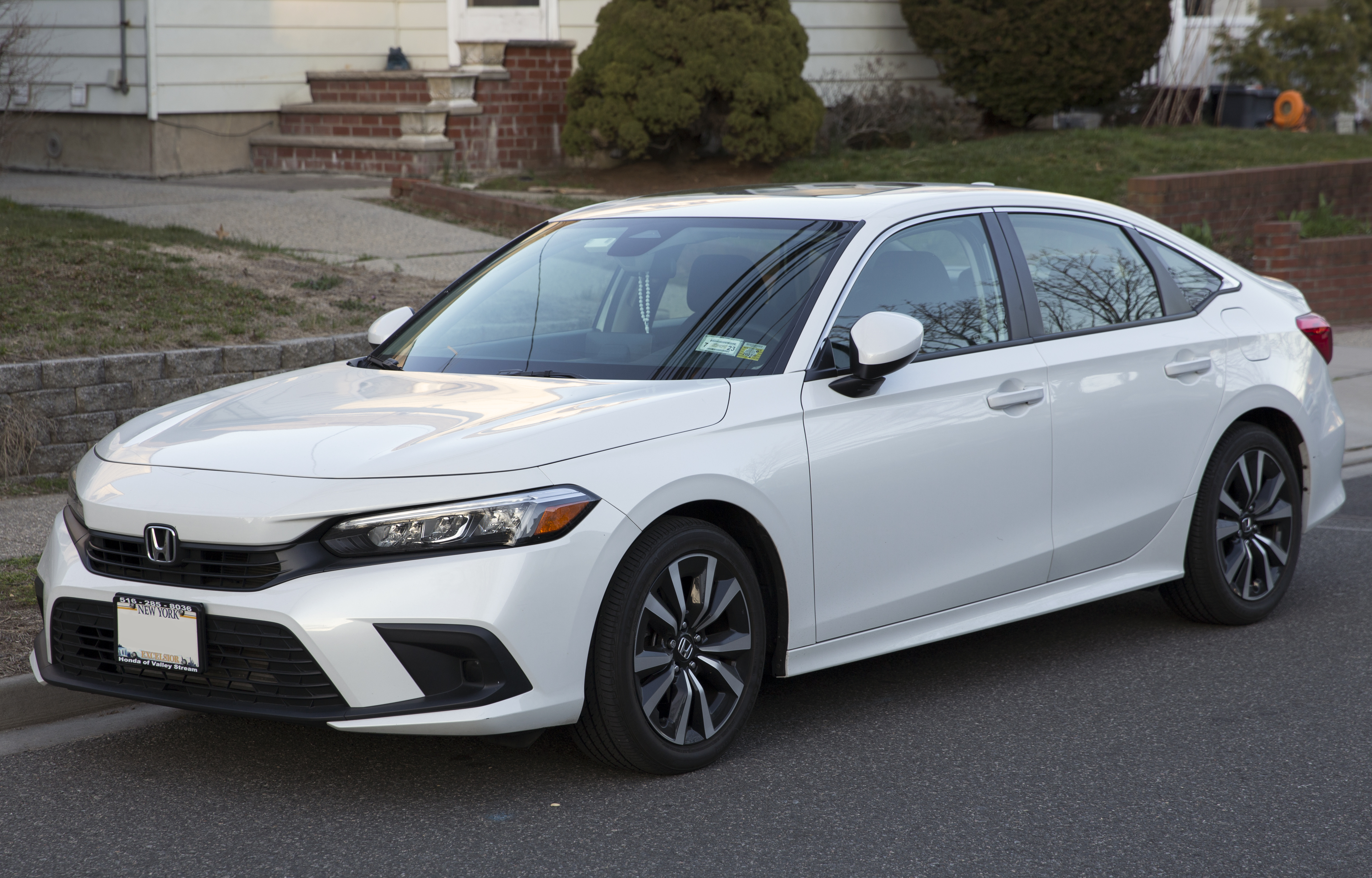
Civic sedan (pre-facelift)

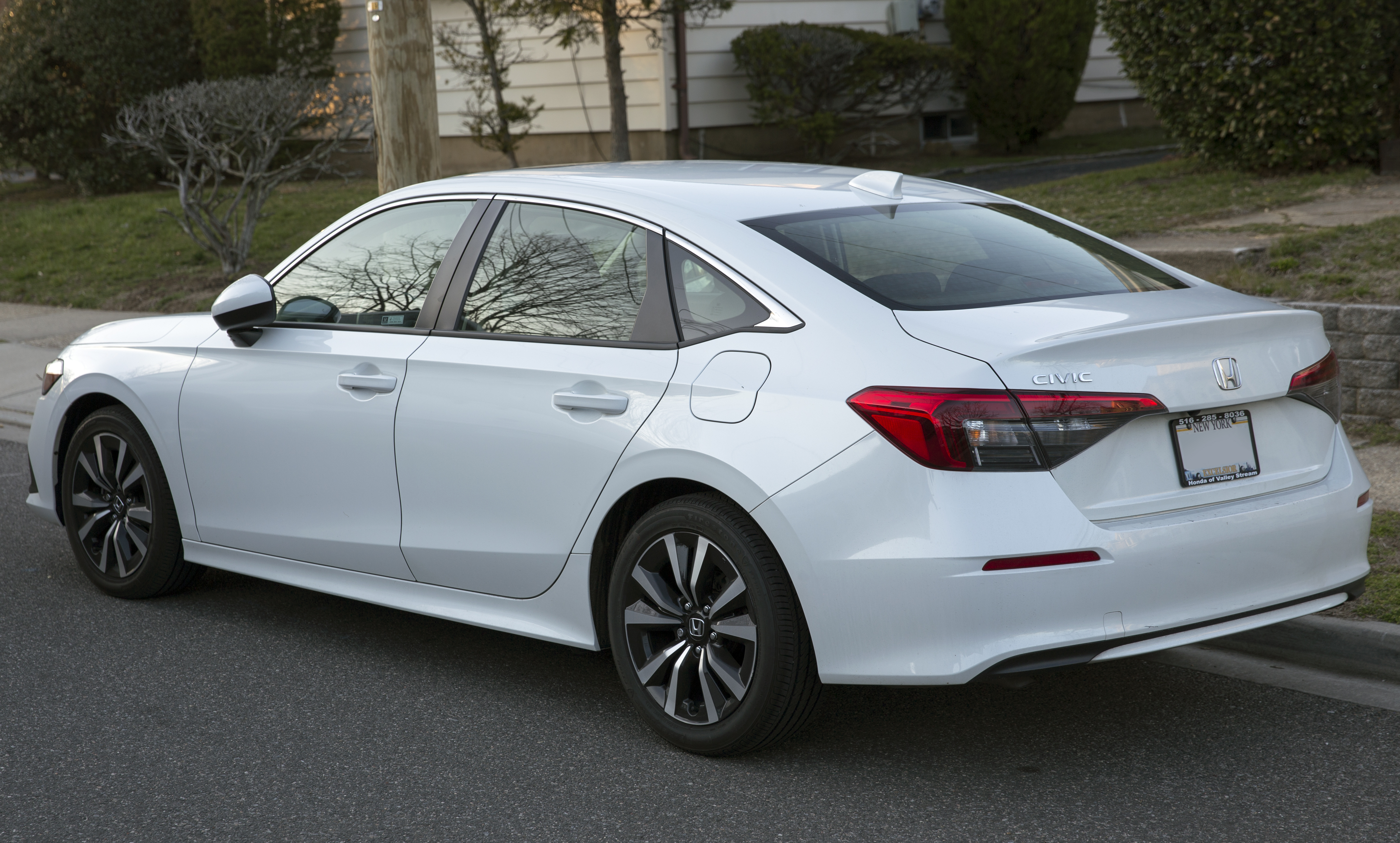
Civic sedan (pre-facelift)

=== Interior ===
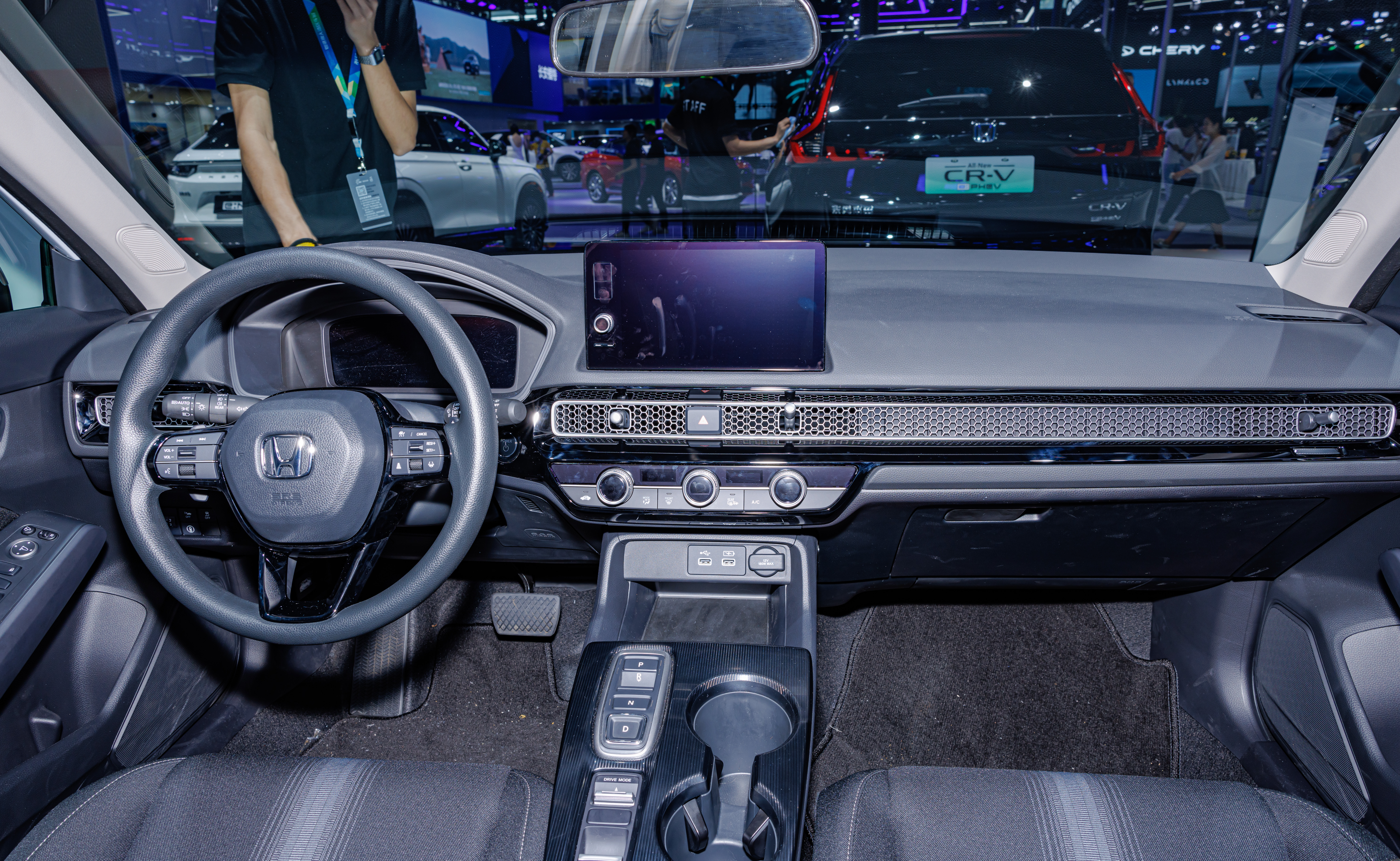
Interior (pre-facelift)

== 2024 facelift ==
The facelifted Civic was revealed on 21 May 2024 for the 2025 model year and released on 12 June 2024. The changes includes an updated front fascia with a new grille and new body coloured trim pieces, smoked taillights, new exterior colours, new alloy wheel designs, a new grey interior colour, and Google built-in feature for the infotainment system.

Along with the Civic facelift, the Hybrid powertrain of Civic sedan and liftback was launched in 2024 for the North American market, making it the of favor successor to the discontinued Insight (third generation). The hybrid powertrain also replaces the 180hp turbocharged L15 engine. The K20C2 was also replaced.

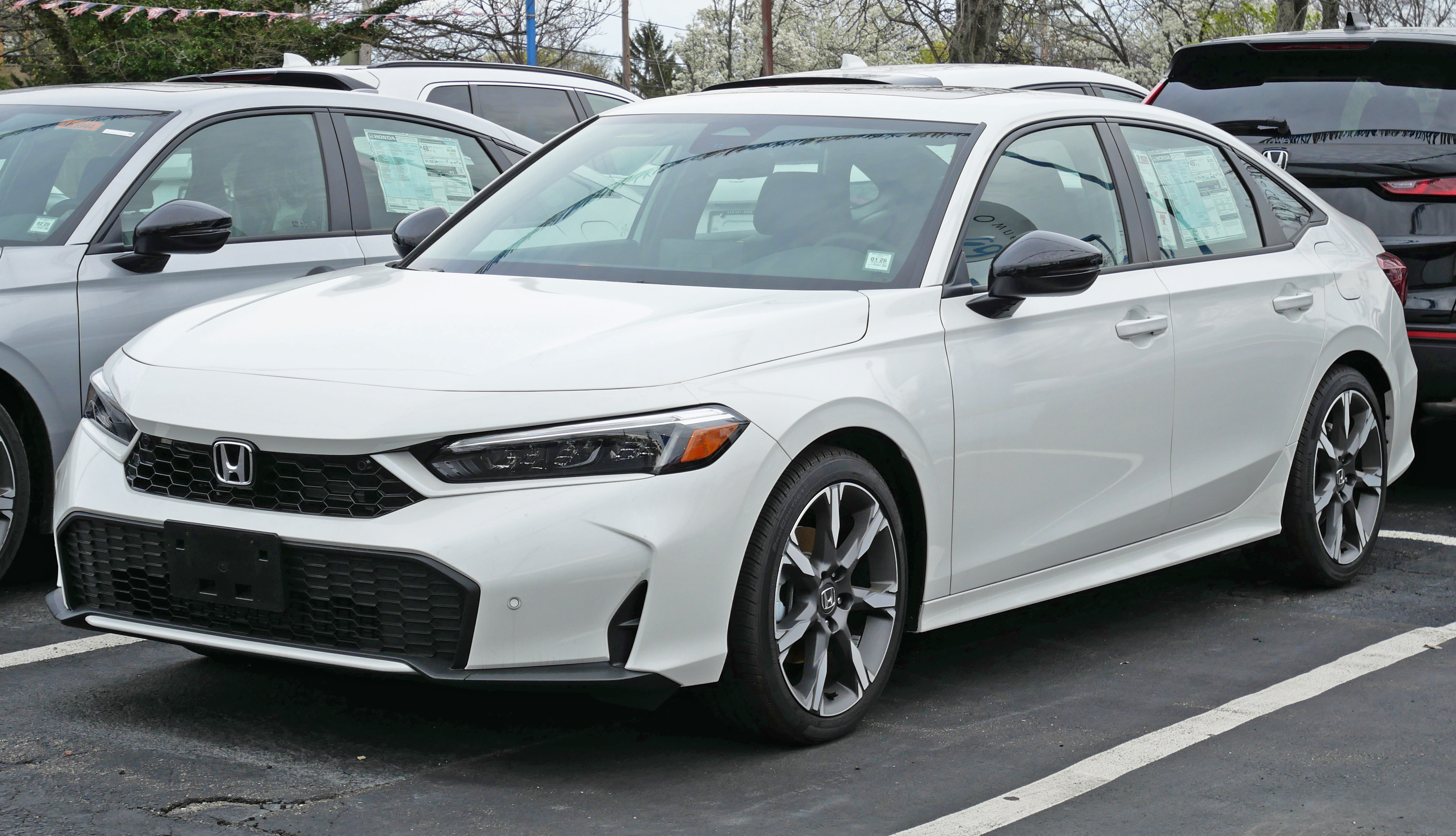
Sedan (facelift)

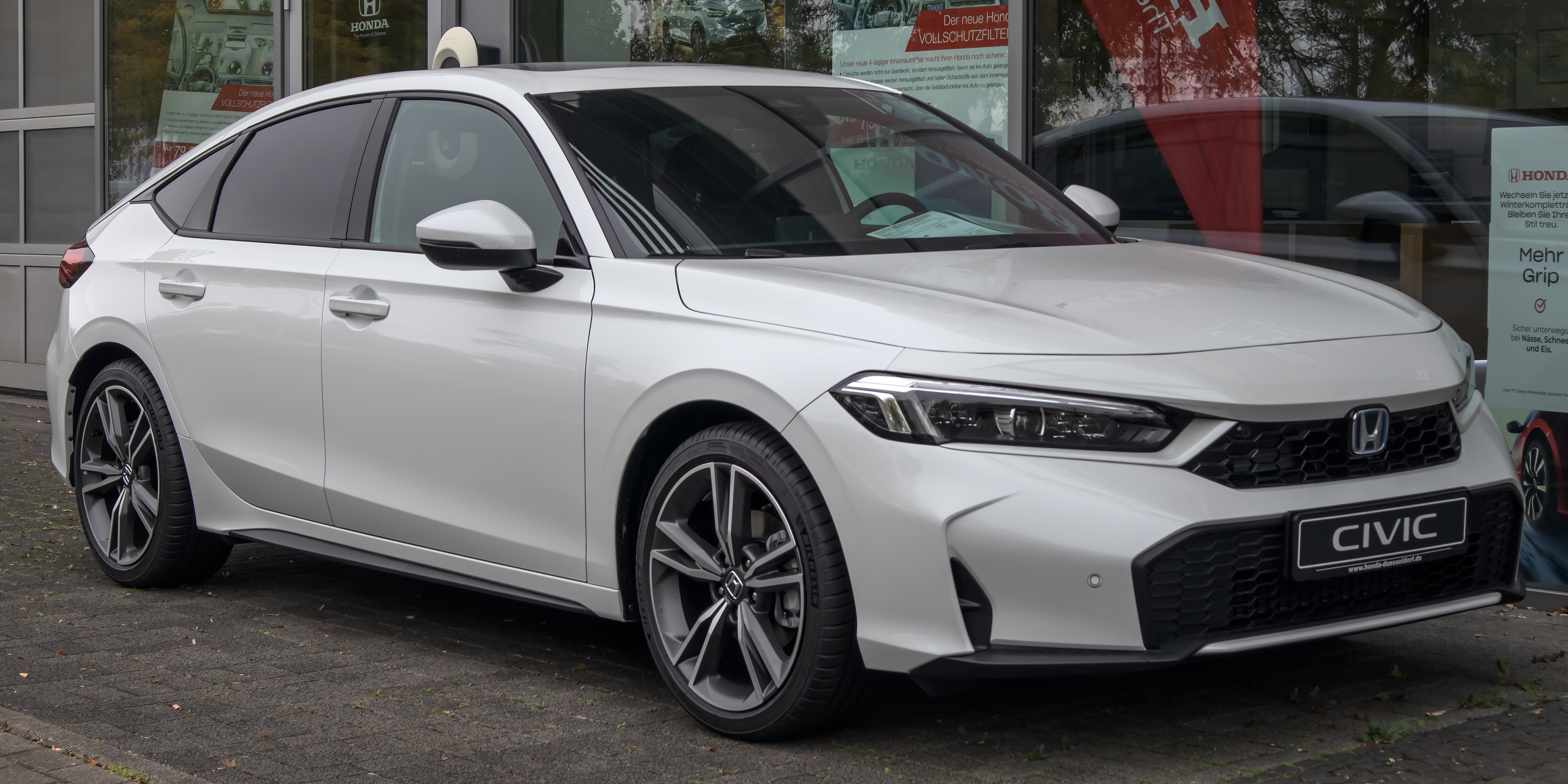
Liftback (facelift)

== Civic e:HEV ==
The hybrid version, marketed as Civic e:HEV, was revealed on 23 March 2022, in both sedan and liftback configurations. The Civic e:HEV liftback became available in Japan and Europe, while the Civic e:HEV sedan became available in Thailand. The model is powered by a newly developed 2.0-litre Atkinson cycle petrol engine with direct injection, combined with a lithium-ion battery and two electric motors. Power for the motors is supplied via a compact 36 kg, 1kWh lithium-ion 72-cell battery pack. Honda claims a 41% thermal efficiency, and a combined CO_{2} emissions figure of 108 g/km (6.1 oz/mi).

The Civic e:HEV replaced the Insight as part of a plan to focus on hybrid models of its three core models, which are CR-V, Accord and Civic.

== Civic Type R ==
The performance-oriented derivative of the eleventh-generation Civic Hatchback was introduced as the sixth-generation Civic Type R, and was unveiled on 20 July 2022. Equipped with widened fenders like its predecessor, the FL5 in contrast gained widened rear doors and rear quarters instead of using a plastic add-on to achieve wider rear fenders. It is powered by the 2.0-litre K20C1 engine carried over from the previous generation with incremental changes such as a revised turbocharger, rated at 330 PS (243 kW; 325 hp).

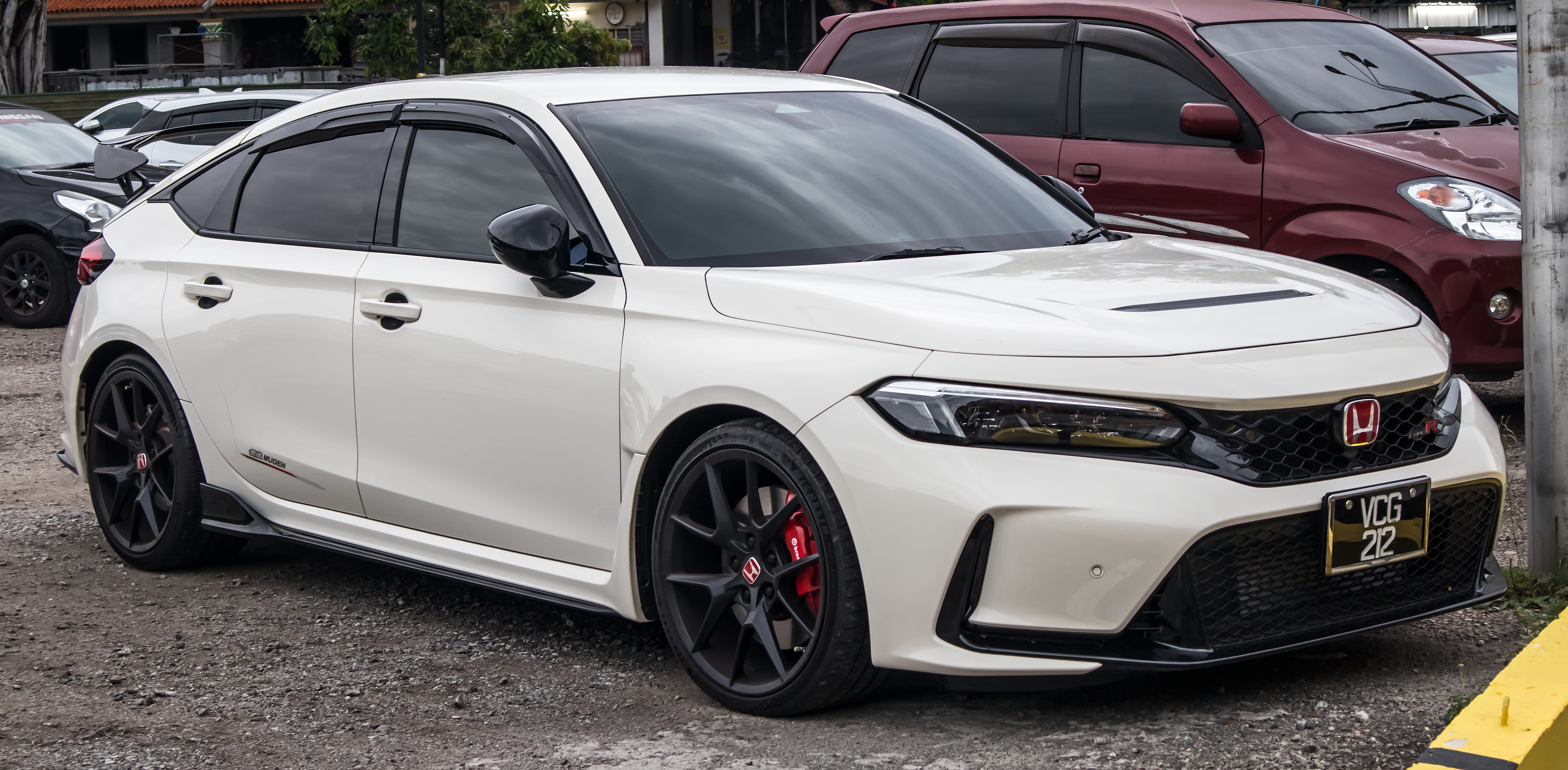
Type R

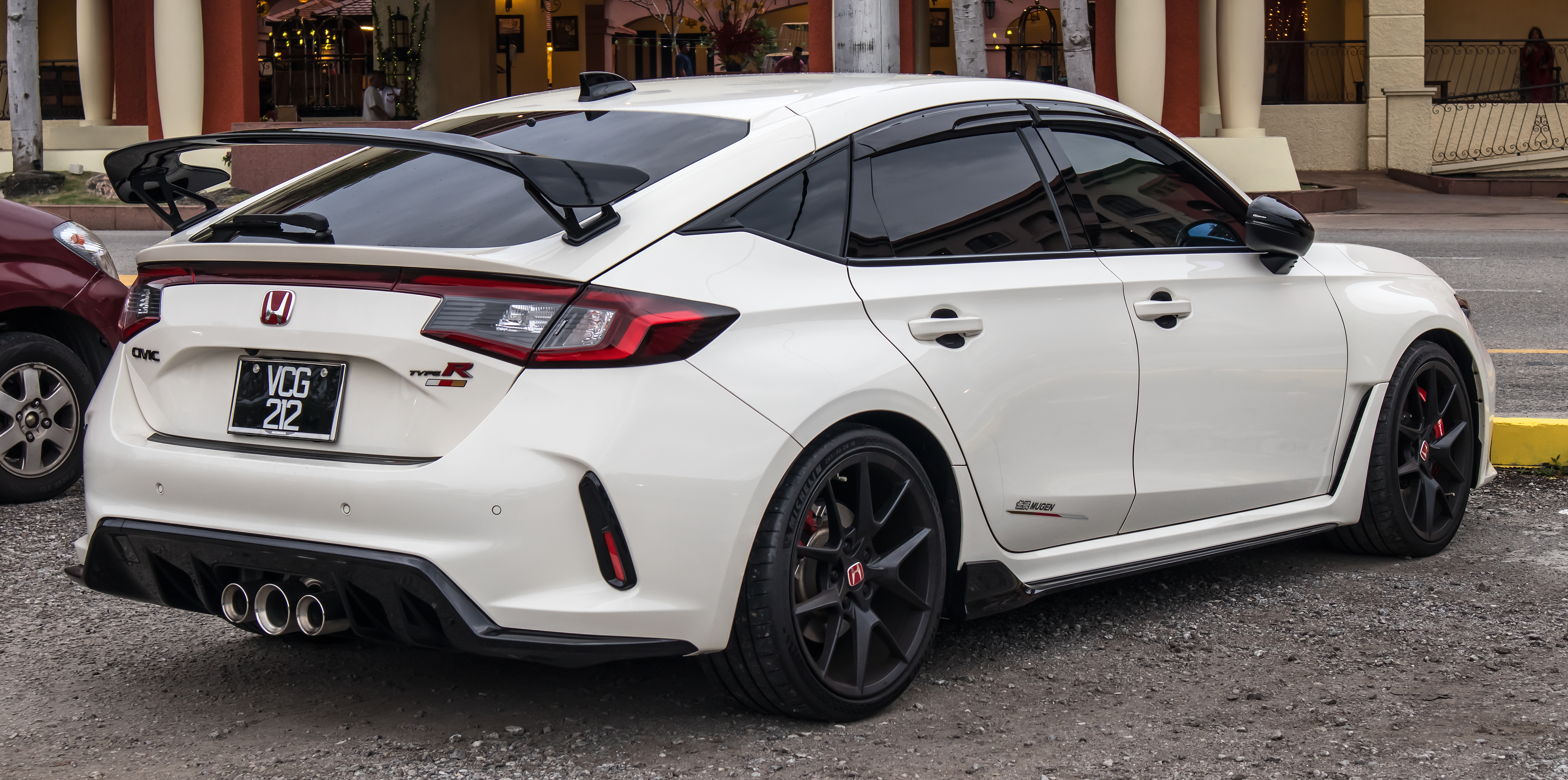
Type R

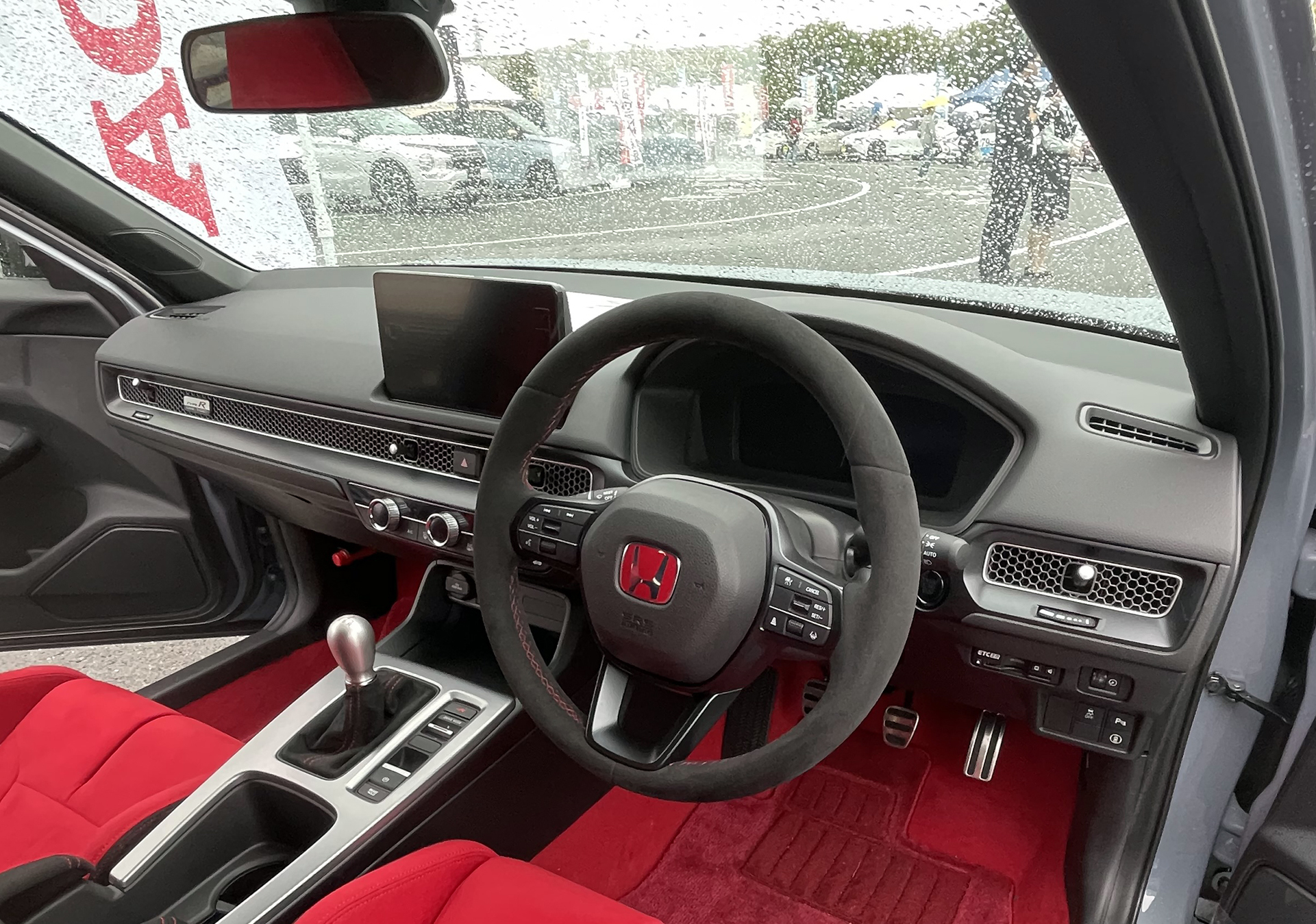
Interior

== Markets ==
=== East Asia ===
==== Japan ====
The eleventh-generation Civic liftback specifications for the Japanese market were revealed on 6 August 2021 and it went on sale in Japan the next month, on 3 September. It was manufactured locally in Yorii, Saitama. The Japanese specification Civic liftback comes in two trim levels: LX and EX, it is powered with a 1.5-litre L15C turbocharged petrol engine paired with either 6-speed manual transmission or CVT. In July 2022, the e:HEV petrol hybrid powertrain was released for the Civic line-up in Japan.

The facelifted Civic was released in Japan on 12 September 2024. The e:HEV petrol hybrid model divided into two variants, e:HEV LX and e:HEV EX, the LX and EX non-hybrid variants became paired only with a CVT, and the introduction of the new RS variant paired with the 6-speed manual.

==== China ====
The eleventh-generation Civic sedan was released in China in September 2021. In the same month, a restyled version produced by Guangqi Honda was released as the Honda Integra (Chinese: 型格; pinyin: Xínggé). The Hatchback version of the Integra was introduced in February 2023.

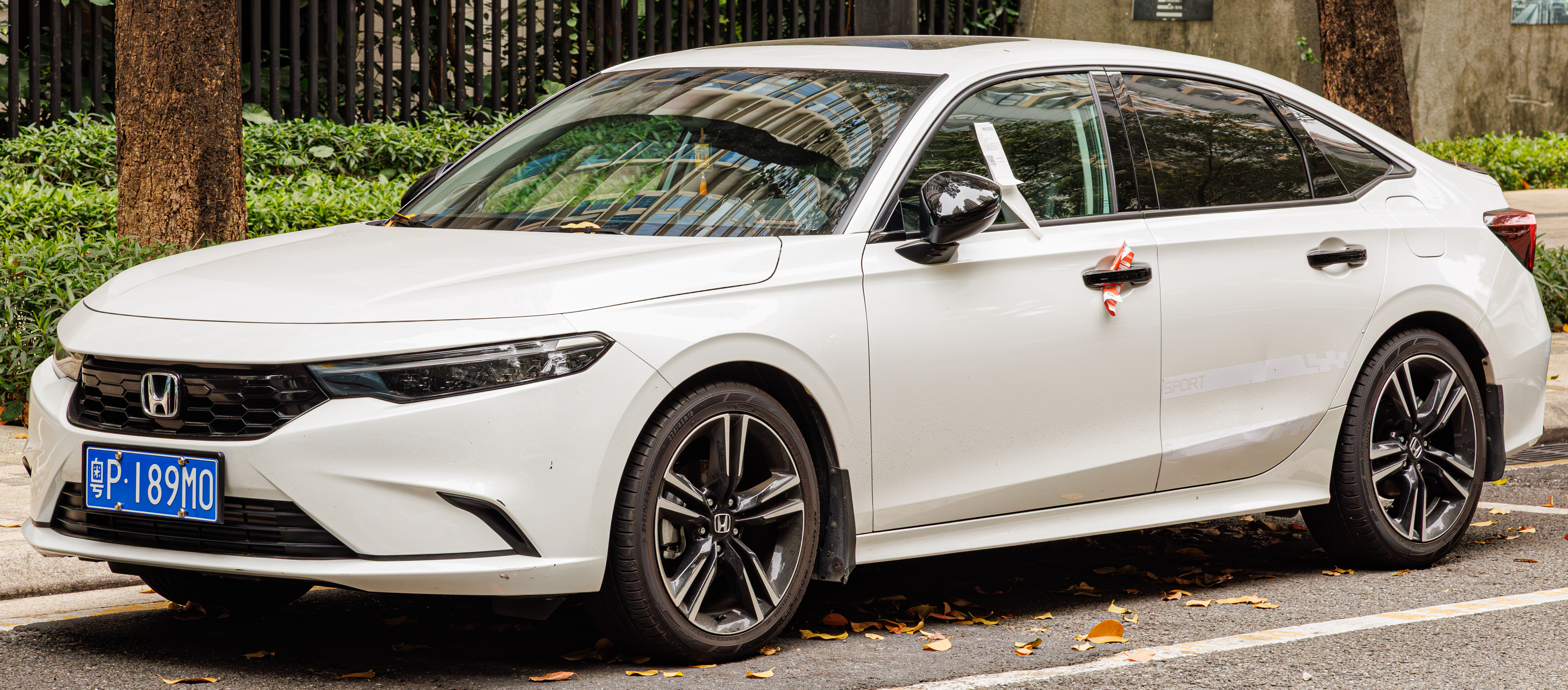
Honda Integra sedan

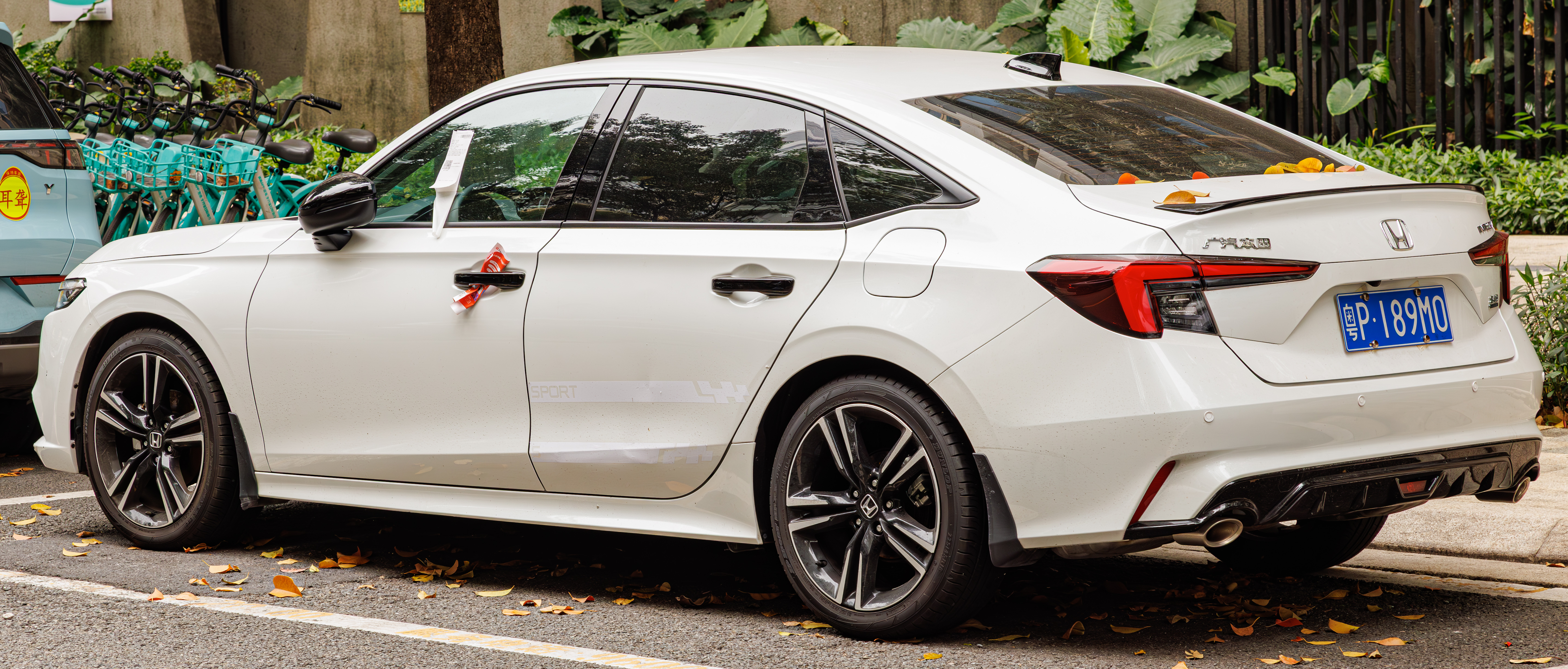
Rear view

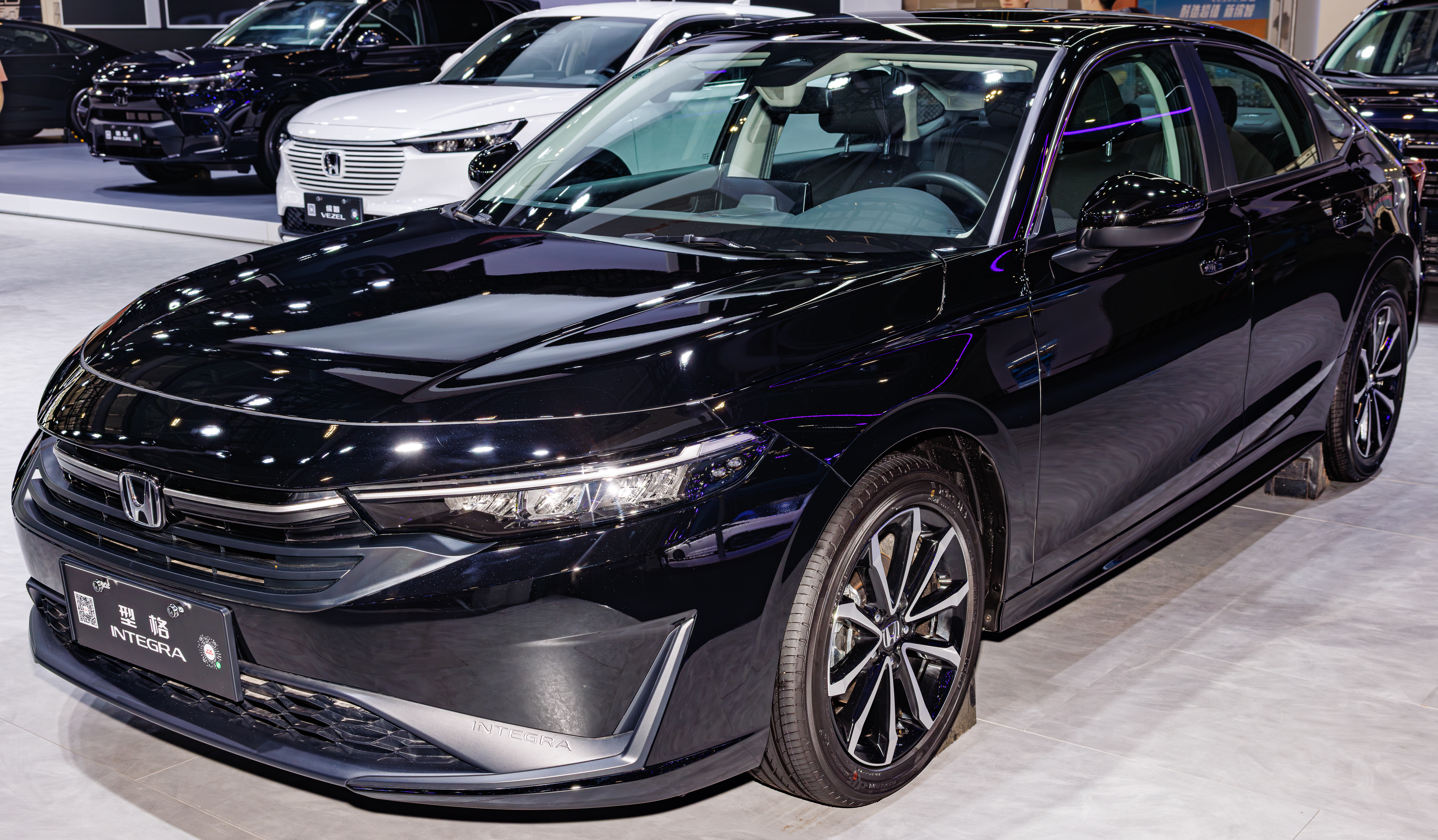
Honda Integra sedan facelift

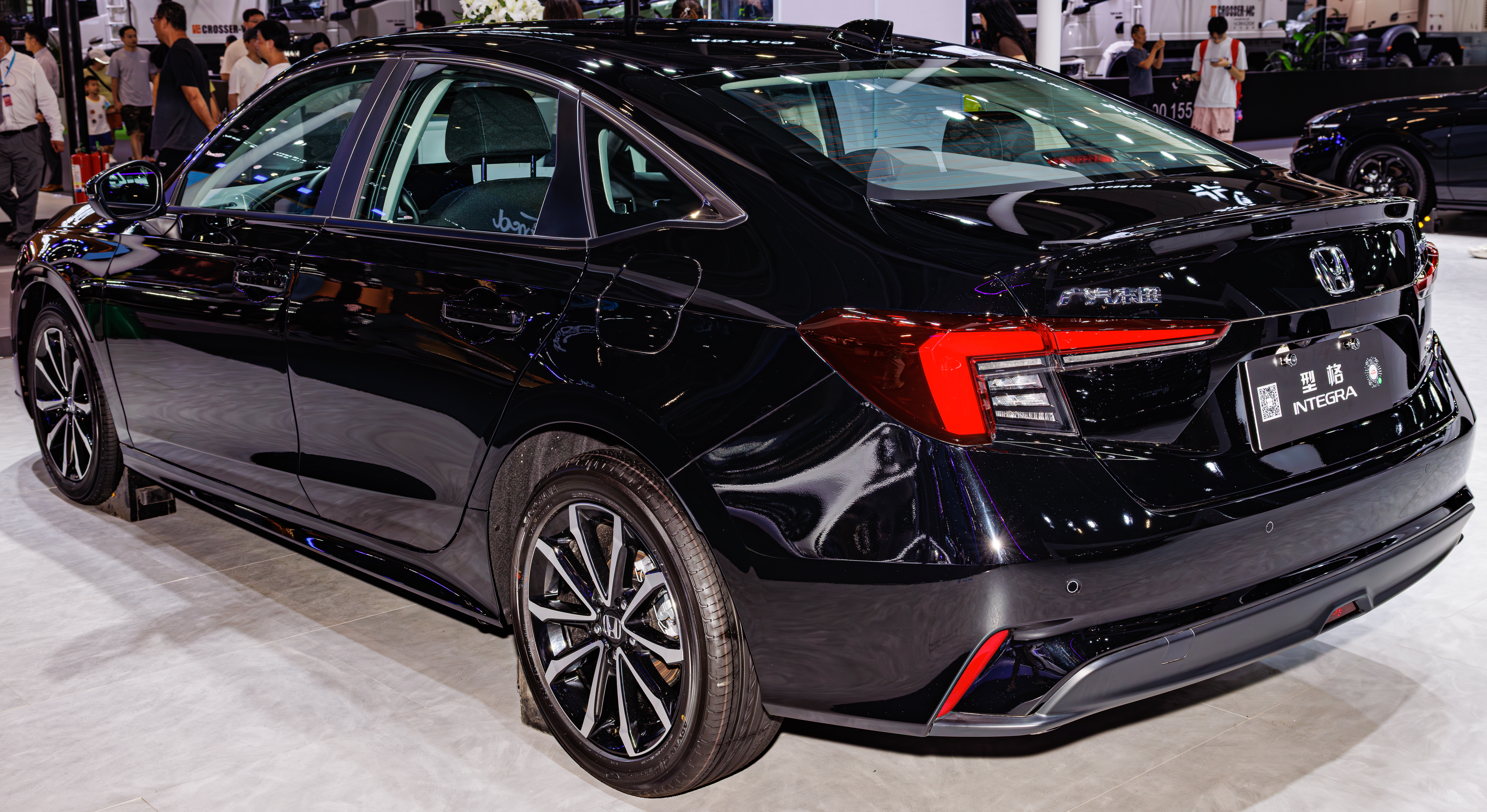
Rear view

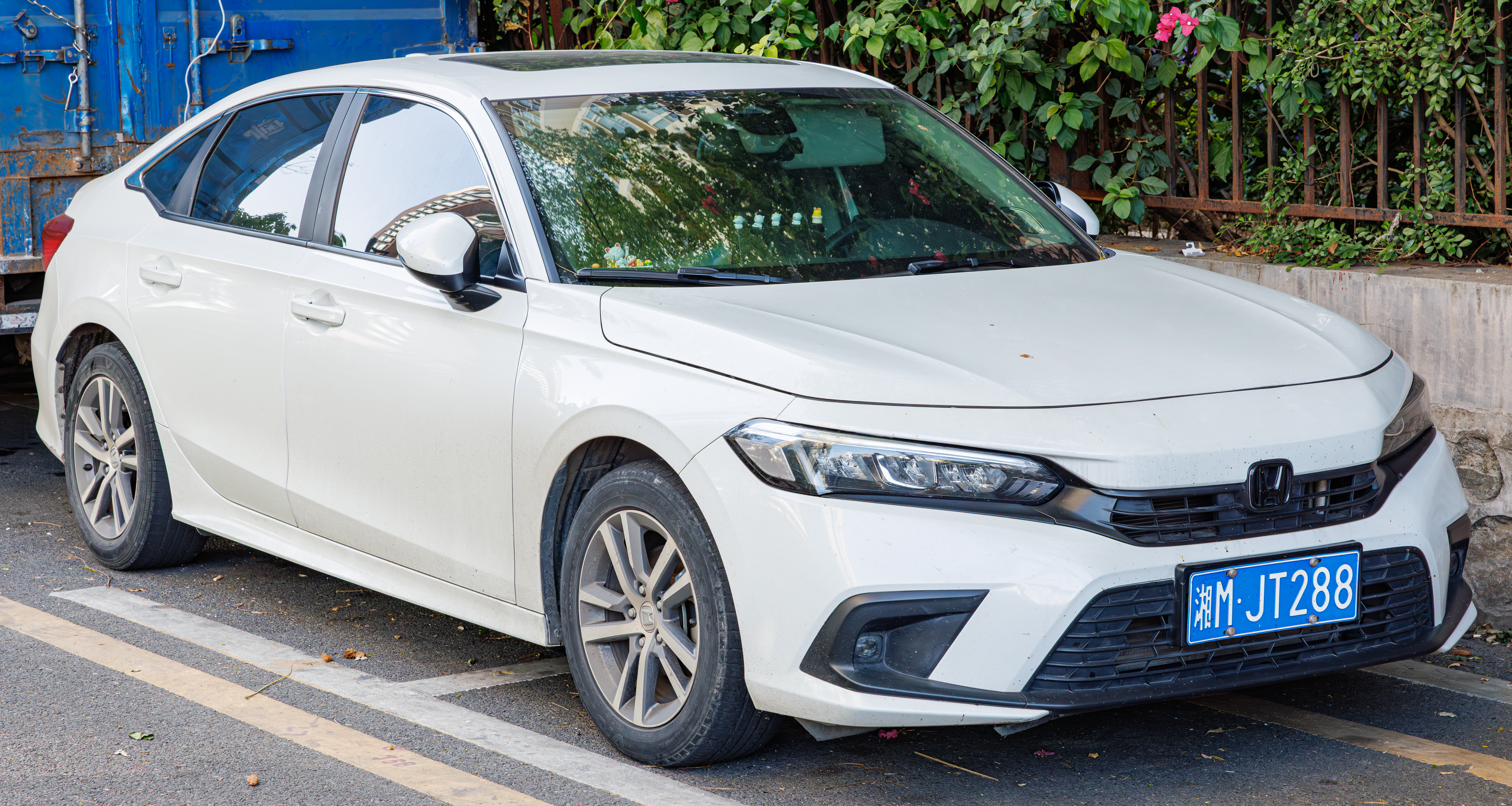
Honda Civic Xi (China)

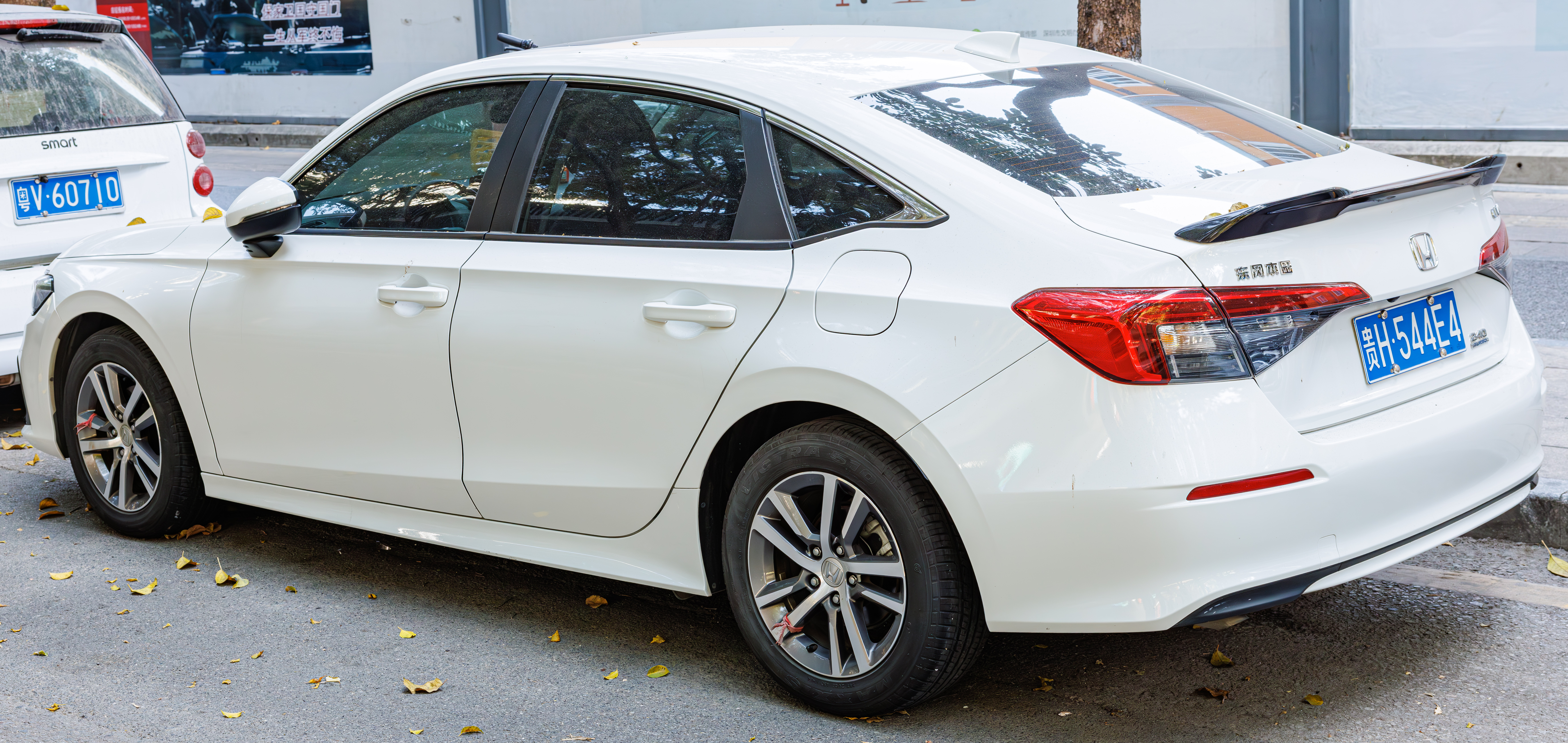
Rear view

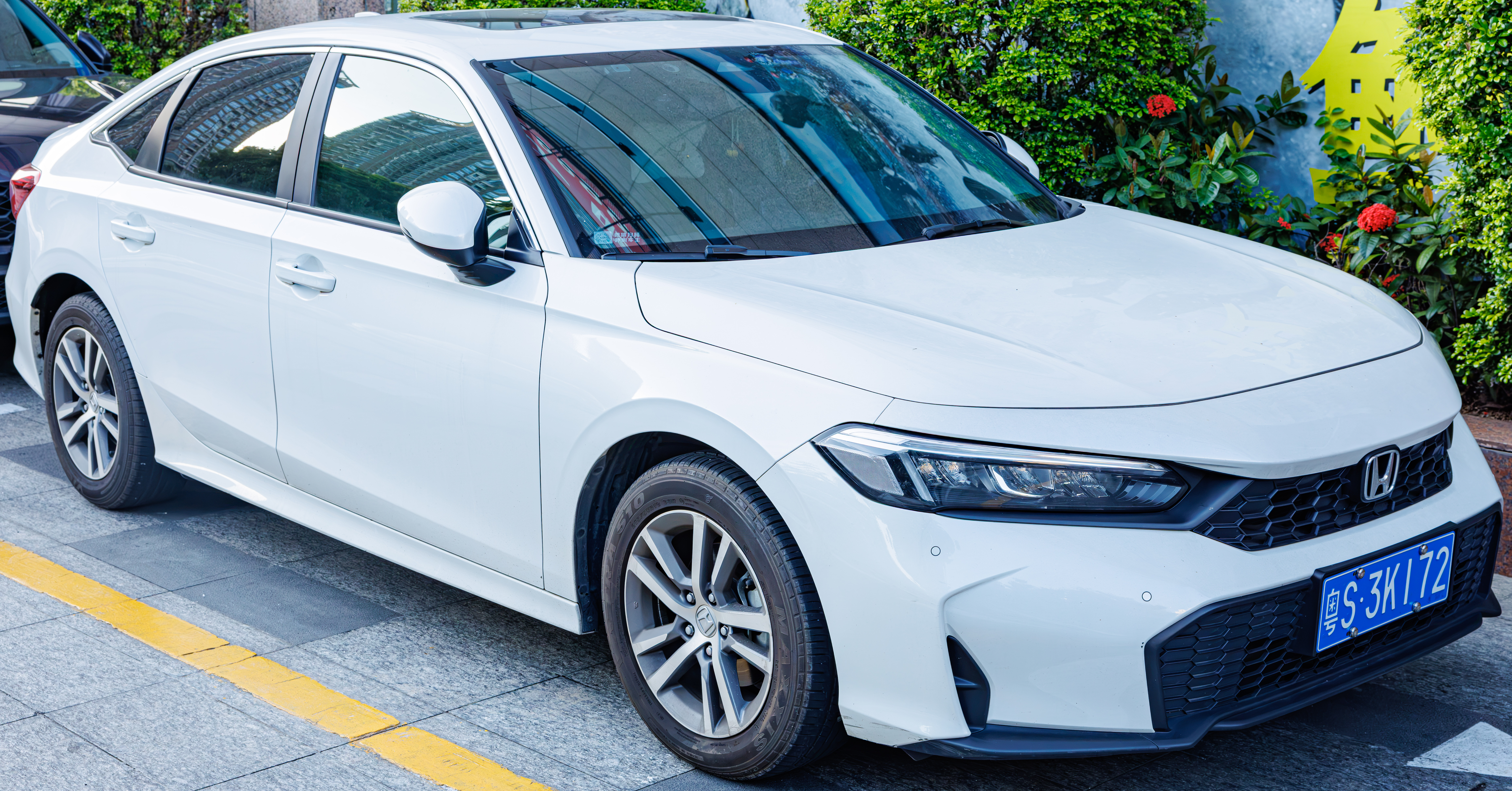
Honda Civic Xi (China; facelift)

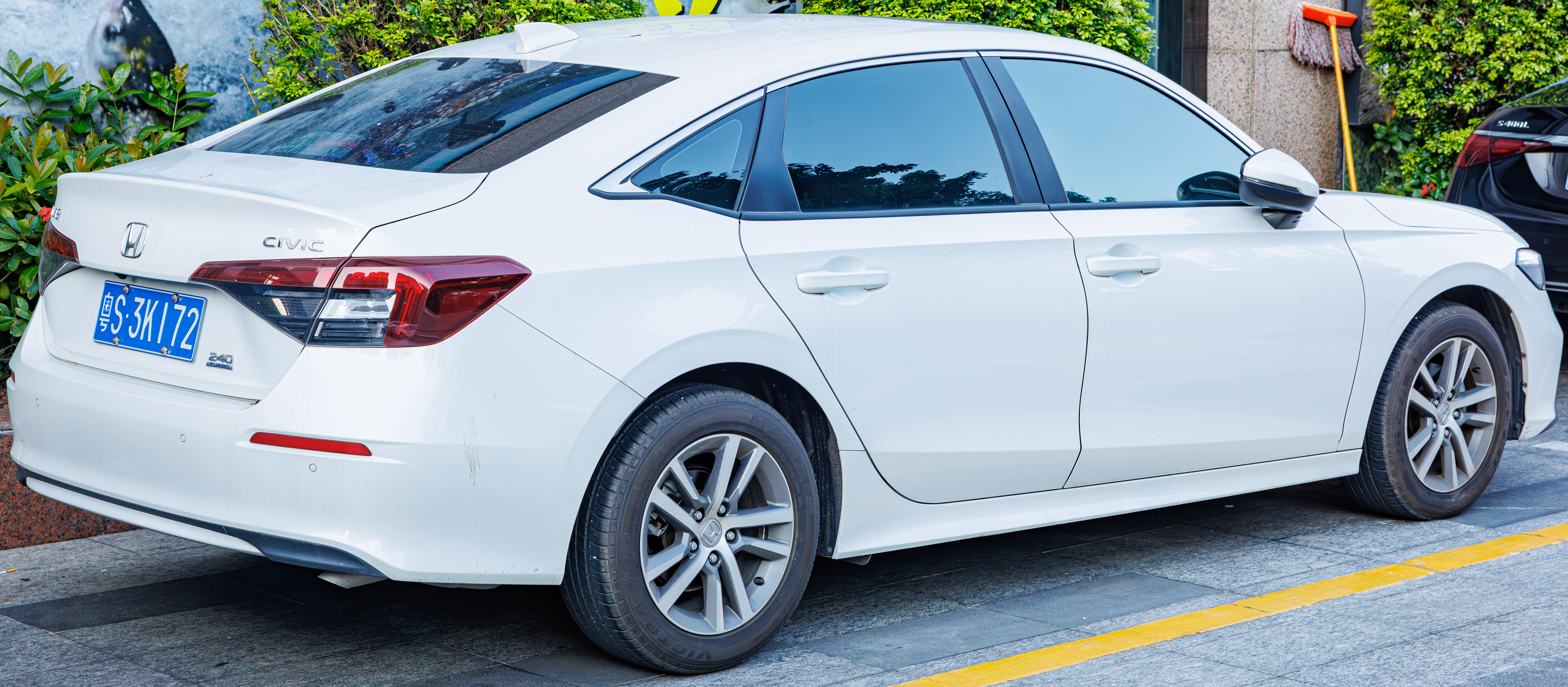
Rear view

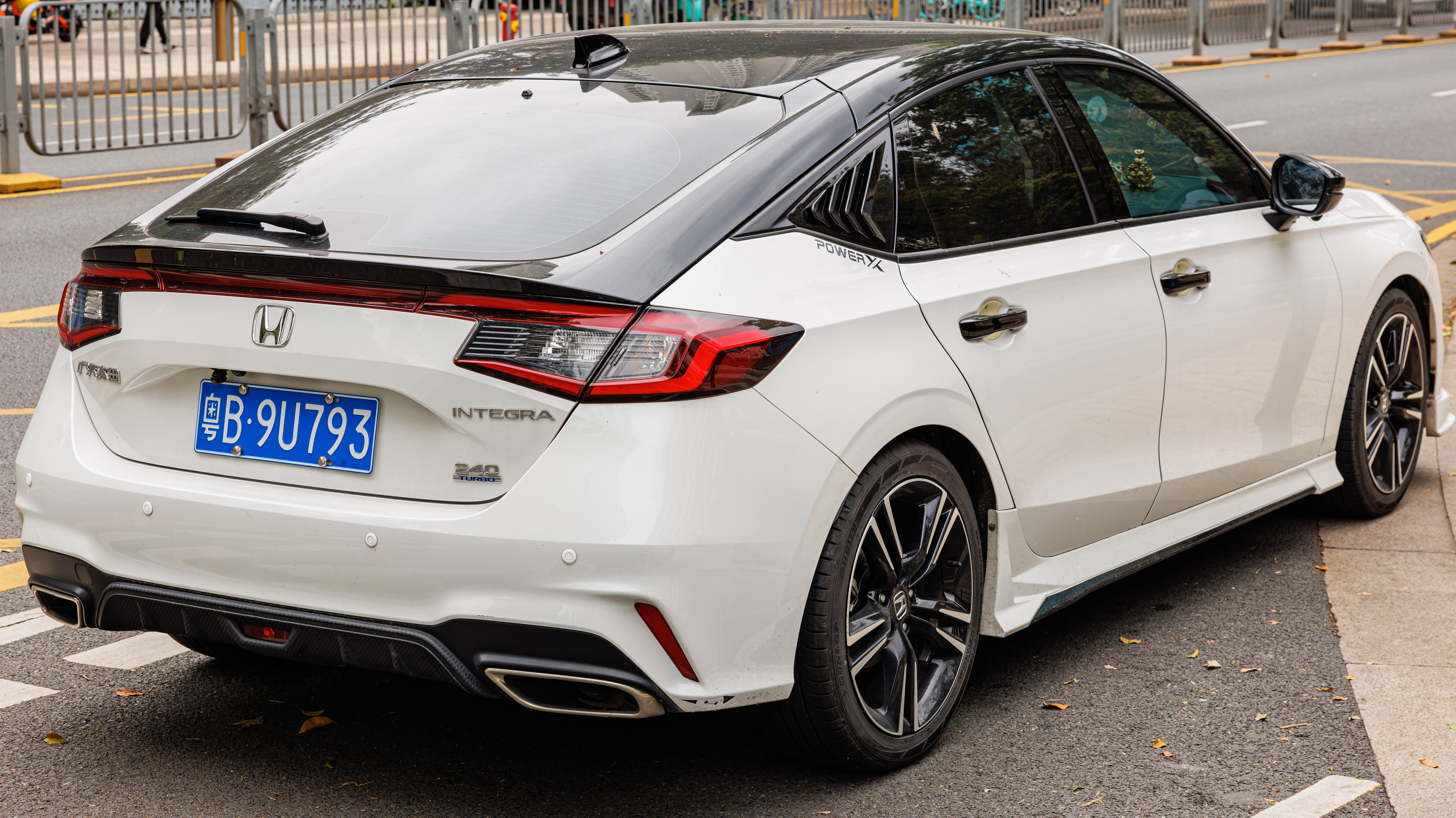
2023 Honda Integra Hatchback (China)

==== Taiwan ====
The eleventh-generation Civic Hatchback was introduced in Taiwan on 12 July 2023. It is available in the sole variant powered by the e:HEV petrol hybrid powertrain and is imported from Japan.

The facelifted Civic Hatchback was launched on 15 April 2025, with the same variant and powertrain from the pre-facelift model.

=== Europe ===
The eleventh-generation Civic made its European debut in August 2022, sourced from Japan followed by the closure of Honda's UK Swindon plant, only the liftback bodystyle is offered and the regular Civic line-up comes exclusively with a petrol hybrid powertrain. In Turkey, only the sedan bodystyle is offered with an 1.5L turbocharged petrol engine, imported from Thailand after Honda's local Gebze plant shut down.

The facelifted Civic was released in the European market in August 2025, like the pre-facelift model, the facelifted model is offered exclusively with a petrol hybrid powertrain. The facelift model omits the front foglights because of the improved technology from the LED headlights.

=== Middle East ===
The eleventh-generation Civic was launched in the Middle East on 5 March 2022. It is powered by the 1.5-litre turbocharged petrol engine, it is only available in a sole trim Sport. Honda Sensing is standard.

=== North America ===
==== United States and Canada ====
The eleventh-generation Civic was released on 16 June 2021, as a 2022 model year in North America. In the United States, the Civic initially came in four trim levels: LX, Sport, EX, and Touring. Trim levels are the same for the Civic Hatchback, except for the EX which is badged EX-L. The LX and Sport trims come with a 2.0-litre petrol engine, while the EX (or EX-L for Hatchback) and Touring models come with a 1.5-litre turbocharged petrol engine. Power outputs are 158 hp (118 kW) for the larger, naturally aspirated engine, while the turbocharged option puts out 180 hp (134 kW).

In Canada, the Civic comes with the same four trim levels but instead arranged as LX, EX, Sport, and Touring in the lineup. In Canada, only the Touring model receives the more powerful 1.5-litre turbocharged petrol engine. All sedan and liftback models come standard with a CVT, however, the liftback can be equipped with a 6-speed manual transmission on Sport and Touring trims.

The 2023 model year eliminated the LX trim, leaving the Sport trim to be the base trim. The LX trim was later reintroduced in the 2023 model year as demand was high enough. The Civic Hybrid was released in late 2024 as a 2025 model year, making it the de facto successor to the discontinued Insight (3rd generation). It is available in sedan and liftback body styles and is identical to the European model, without the "e:HEV" designation. Both body styles are available in Sport and Sport Touring trims.

===== Si =====
The Civic Si version was unveiled in October 2021 for the 2022 model year. Available only as a sedan since the coupe bodystyle was discontinued, it is powered by a more powerful version of the EX and Touring's 1.5-litre, direct injected turbocharged petrol engine and is only available with a 6-speed manual transmission. The Si remains a North American exclusive model, being only sold in that region. The engine has variable timing control on the intake and exhaust valves, and variable valve lift on the exhaust valves. It produces 200 hp (149 kW) and 192 lb⋅ft (260 N⋅m) of torque. Peak horsepower is reached at 6,000 rpm, while low end maximum torque is available between 1,800 and 5,000 rpm.

=== Oceania ===
In the Oceania region, only the liftback bodystyle of the eleventh-generation Civic is offered, due to declining sales of the Sedan bodystyle and the majority of small car buyers preference for hatchbacks.

==== Australia ====
The Civic Hatchback was released in Australia on 29 November 2021, sourced from Japan, in a sole trim LX, it is powered by a 1.5-litre L15B7 turbocharged petrol engine. In December 2022, the e:HEV petrol hybrid, in the LX trim, was added to the Civic range.

The facelifted Civic Hatchback was launched in Australia on 4 December 2024. For the facelift model, the VTi LX variant was replaced by the e:HEV L as the entry-level variant, therefore the Civic became hybrid-only in Australia.

==== New Zealand ====
The Civic Hatchback was launched in New Zealand on 10 December 2021 in a sole trim Sport, it is powered by a 1.5-litre L15B7 turbocharged petrol engine. In July 2022, a special edition Mugen variant was added to the Civic range to celebrate the Civic's 50th anniversary.

The facelifted Civic Hatchback was launched in New Zealand on 27 December 2024, in the sole e:HEV SR variant.

=== Latin America ===
==== Argentina ====
The eleventh-generation Civic was launched in Argentina on 1 November 2024, in the sole Advanced Hybrid variant, it is powered by a 2.0-litre LFC2 e:HEV petrol hybrid.

==== Brazil ====
The eleventh-generation Civic was launched in Brazil on 5 June 2023, sourced from Thailand, in a sole variant, it is powered by a 2.0-litre LFC2 e:HEV petrol hybrid.

==== Chile ====
The eleventh-generation Civic was launched in Chile on 5 May 2022, sourced from Thailand, in two trim levels: EX-T and Touring. It is powered by a 1.5-litre L15B7 turbocharged petrol engine.

==== Mexico ====
The eleventh-generation Civic was launched in Mexico on 6 August 2021, only available as a sedan sourced from Canada. It is available in three trim levels: i-Style, Sport and Touring. It is available with two powertrain options: 2.0-litre K20C2 petrol and a 1.5-litre L15BG FFV turbocharged petrol engine.

The facelifted Civic was launched in Mexico on 5 November 2024, with three variants: i-Style, Sport Hybrid and Touring Hybrid. For engines, the i-Style trim uses the 2.0-litre K20C2 petrol while the Sport and Touring trim levels use the 2.0-litre LFC2 e:HEV petrol hybrid.

==== Peru ====
The eleventh-generation Civic was launched in Peru on 25 September 2022, in a sole variant, it is powered by a 1.5-litre L15B7 turbocharged petrol engine.

=== South Africa ===
The eleventh-generation Civic was launched in South Africa on 4 August 2022, in a sole RS trim, it is powered by a 1.5-litre L15B7 turbocharged petrol engine.

The Civic was discontinued in South Africa in August 2026, due to "the South African market continues to show a strong and growing preference for SUVs".

=== South Asia ===
==== Pakistan ====
The eleventh-generation Civic was launched in Pakistan in March 2022 as a locally assembled model. Only available as a sedan, three trim levels are offered: 1.5 Turbo Standard, 1.5 Turbo Oriel and 1.5 Turbo RS, the latter two of which come with a sunroof. The Standard and Oriel trims come with the 1.5 L L15BJ I4 turbo petrol engine, producing 129 PS (127 hp; 95 kW) while the top RS trim comes with the 1.5 L L15BG FFV I4 turbo petrol engine producing 178 PS (176 hp; 131 kW). The RS version also receives additional exterior trims such as spoiler and black accents and also Honda Sensing.

The facelifted Civic was launched in Pakistan on 1 January 2026, with the same variants from the previous model although the Standard grade was discontinued. Honda Sensing is now standard across the Civic range.

=== Southeast Asia ===
The eleventh-generation Civic in the ASEAN market is only offered as a sedan, due to slow sales of the hatchback bodystyle. For example in Thailand, the Sedan outsold the Hatchback during the year 2020, by a ratio of 9:1 respectively.

==== Indonesia ====
The eleventh-generation Civic was launched in Indonesia on 28 October 2021 alongside the City Sedan, sourced from Thailand, in a sole RS trim, it is powered by a 1.5-litre L15B7 turbocharged petrol engine.

The facelifted Civic was launched in Indonesia on 8 May 2025, in the sole RS e:HEV variant.

==== Malaysia ====
The eleventh-generation Civic was launched in Malaysia on 13 January 2022, in three trim levels: E, V and RS. All variants are powered by a 1.5-litre L15B7 turbocharged petrol engine. Honda Sensing is standard on all trim levels. All Civic variants are locally assembled in Alor Gajah, Melaka. In November 2022, the e:HEV petrol hybrid powertrain was introduced to Malaysia, in the RS trim, it served as the flagship variant for the Civic range. On 6 November 2024, a proactive product update was issued to Civic models manufactured in between 2022 and 2024 that may cause potential issues with the Electric Power Steering gearbox.

The facelifted Civic was launched in Malaysia on 9 January 2025, with the same variants from the pre-facelift model.

==== Philippines ====
The eleventh-generation Civic was launched in the Philippines on 23 November 2021, in three trim levels: S, V and RS. All variants are powered by a 1.5-litre L15BG FFV turbocharged petrol engine. Honda Sensing is standard on all trim levels.

The facelifted Civic was launched in the Philippines on 24 October 2024, with three variants: V Turbo, RS Turbo and RS e:HEV. The RS e:HEV variant with S+ Shift was introduced in October 2026.

==== Singapore ====
The eleventh-generation Civic was launched in Singapore on 12 August 2021 in a sole variant. In Singapore, the Civic is powered by a detuned 1.5-litre L15BJ turbocharged petrol engine producing 129PS (127 hp; 95 kW) to qualify for the Category A COE in Singapore's Vehicle Quota System; in this category, the engine displacement must not exceed 1,600cc (1.6-litres) and a maximum output of 132PS (130 hp; 97 kW).

The facelifted Civic was launched in Singapore on 29 November 2024, with the introduction of the e:HEV variant.

==== Thailand ====
The eleventh-generation Civic was launched in Thailand on 6 August 2021, in three trim levels: EL, EL+ and RS. At launch, all trim levels are powered by a 1.5-litre L15BG FFV turbocharged petrol engine. In March 2022, the e:HEV powertrain for the Civic Sedan was announced in Thailand, with sales began later in August 2022, it comes in two trim levels: EL+ and RS.

The facelifted Civic was launched in Thailand on 1 August 2024, with three variants: Turbo EL+, e:HEV EL+ and e:HEV RS. For the facelifted model, the base EL trim was discontinued. In February 2026, the Turbo EL+ variant was replaced by the e:HEV EL as the entry-level variant, therefore the Civic became hybrid-only in Thailand. In July 2026, the e:HEV RS variant with S+ Shift added.

==== Vietnam ====
The eleventh-generation Civic was launched in Vietnam on 16 February 2022, imported from Thailand, in three trim levels: E, G and RS. All variants are powered by a 1.5-litre L15B7 turbocharged petrol engine. Honda Sensing is standard on all trim levels.

The facelifted Civic was launched in Vietnam on 23 October 2024, with three variants: G, RS and e:HEV RS.

== Mitsuoka M55 ==
=== Concept version ===
The Mitsuoka M55 first unveiled in 2023 as a concept car based on the eleventh-generation Civic liftback, to commemorate the 55th anniversary of the Mitsuoka. It has styling cues inspired by C130 "Kenmeri" Nissan Skyline with combinating of the Dodge Challenger's front fascia. The car's dimension is 4,735 mm (186.4 in) of length; 175 mm (6.9 in) more longer than the Civic Liftback, which is the basis of the car.

=== Production version ===
The production M55 was almost identical to the concept. It initially went on sale with the limited edition ‘Zero Edition’ in early 2025. Following the instant sell-out of that model, a second version will go on sale in 2026. The First edition was released in 2025 with limited run of 100 units.

Mitsuoka M55

Rear view

== Powertrain ==
Engine	Chassis code	Horsepower	Torque
1.5 L L15B7 I4 turbo petrol	FE1 (Sedan); FL1 (Hatchback)	180 hp (134 kW; 182 PS) at 5,700 rpm	180 lb⋅ft (244 N⋅m) at 1,700-4,500 rpm
1.5 L L15C I4 turbo petrol	FL1 (Hatchback)	180 hp (134 kW; 182 PS) at 5,700 rpm	180 lb⋅ft (244 N⋅m) at 1,700-4,500 rpm
2.0 L K20C2 I4 petrol	FE2 (Sedan); FL2 (Hatchback)	158 hp (118 kW; 160 PS) at 6,500 rpm	138 lb⋅ft (187 N⋅m) at 4,200 rpm
2.0 L K20C9 I4 Atkinson cycle petrol	FE2 (Sedan); FL2 (Hatchback)	150 hp (112 kW; 152 PS) at 6,400 rpm	133 lb⋅ft (180 N⋅m) at 4,000–5,000 rpm
1.5 L L15BG FFV I4 turbo petrol	FE1 (Sedan)	176 hp (131 kW; 178 PS) at 6,000 rpm	180 lb⋅ft (244 N⋅m) at 1,700-4,500 rpm
1.5 L L15BJ I4 turbo petrol	FE1 (Sedan)	127 hp (95 kW; 129 PS) at 5,700 rpm	130 lb⋅ft (176 N⋅m) at 1,700-4,500 rpm
1.5 L L15CA I4 turbo petrol	FE1 (Si Sedan)	200 hp (149 kW; 203 PS) at 6,000 rpm	190 lb⋅ft (258 N⋅m) at 1,800-5,000 rpm
2.0 L LFA1 / LFB1 I4 hybrid petrol	FL4 (Hatchback)	143 hp (107 kW; 145 PS) at 6,200 rpm (engine); 181 hp (135 kW; 184 PS) at 5,000 – 6,000 rpm (electric motor); 212 hp (158 kW; 215 PS) (combined)	129 lb⋅ft (175 N⋅m) at 3,500 rpm (engine); 232 lb⋅ft (315 N⋅m) at 0–2,000 rpm (electric motor)
2.0 L LFC2 I4 hybrid petrol (Thailand)	FE4 (Sedan)	139 hp (104 kW; 141 PS) at 6,000 rpm (engine) 181 hp (135 kW; 184 PS) at 5,000 – 6,000 rpm (electric motor)	134 lb⋅ft (182 N⋅m) at 4,500 rpm (engine) 232 lb⋅ft (315 N⋅m) at 0 – 2,000 rpm (electric motor)

== Safety ==
ASEAN NCAP test results Honda Civic (2021)
Test	Points
Overall:	5 /5 stars
Adult occupant:	36.59
Child occupant:	18.32
Safety assist:	18.16
Motorcyclist Safety:	10.39

Euro NCAP test results Honda Civic 2.0 e:HEV Sport (2022)
Test	Points	%
Overall:	5 /5 stars	
Adult occupant:	33.9	89%
Child occupant:	43.0	87%
Pedestrian:	44.4	82%
Safety assist:	12.1	13.4%

IIHS scores
	Sedan	Hatchback
Small overlap front (driver)	Good	
Small overlap front (passenger)	Good	
Moderate overlap front (original test)	Good	
Moderate overlap front (updated test)	Acceptable	
Side (original test)	Good	
Side (updated test)	Acceptable	
Roof strength	Good	
Head restraints and seats	Good	
Headlights	Good	
Front crash prevention: vehicle-to-vehicle	Superior	
Front crash prevention: vehicle-to-pedestrian (Day)	Superior	
Front crash prevention: vehicle-to-pedestrian (Night)	Advanced	
Seat belt reminders	Good	
Child seat anchors (LATCH) ease of use	Good+	

ANCAP test results Honda Civic e:HEV (Hybrid) variant only (2022, aligned with Euro NCAP)
Test	Points	%
Overall:	5 /5 stars	
Adult occupant:	33.94	89%
Child occupant:	44	89%
Pedestrian:	44.39	82%
Safety assist:	13.32	83%

Preceded by Honda Civic (tenth generation)	Honda Civic; 2021–	Succeeded by Incumbent
