= Greenhouse (car) =

Vehicle component

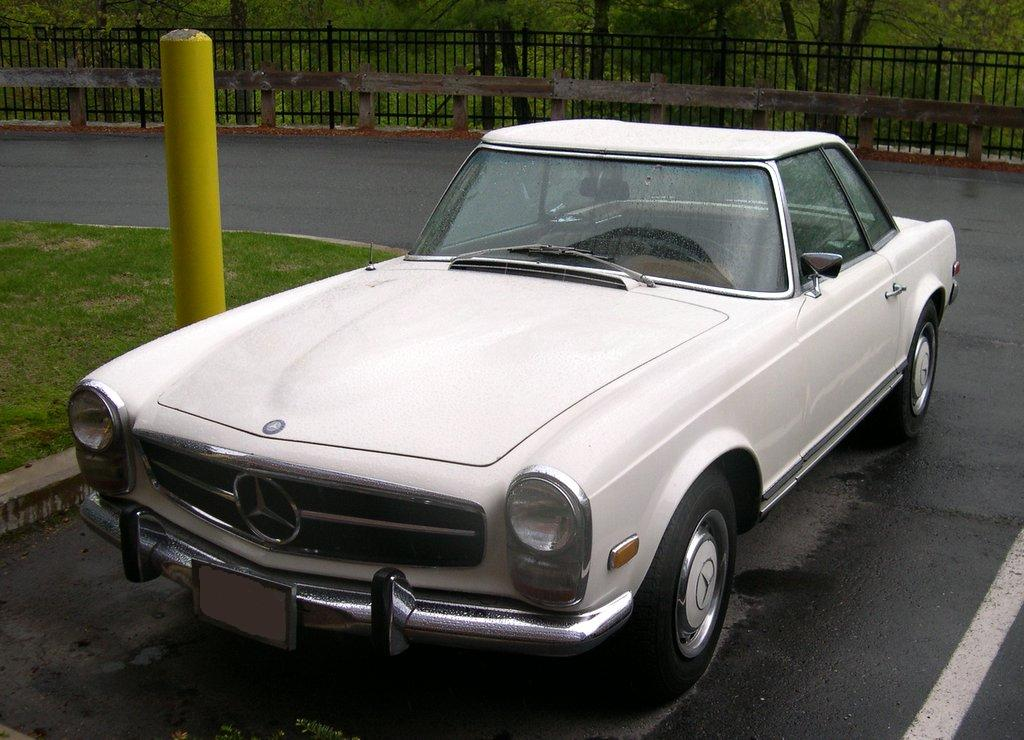
The prominent all-glass, inward sloping greenhouse is a distinguishing feature of the Mercedes-Benz 280 SL

The greenhouse of a vehicle refers to the part of its body above the fender- or beltline, so-called because it comprises mostly areas with glass: the windshield, side, and rear windows (or backlight), and sometimes also roof glass. These glassed areas are also known collectively as the car's daylight opening (DLO). To distinguish the greenhouse from DLO, the greenhouse is a superset which also includes the metal structures above the beltline: in general, these include the roof and all pillars separating the glass and upholding the roof.

== Design and terminology ==
The shape and position of the greenhouse have a defining influence on the looks and functionality of the car, and are a prime means of differentiating between common body styles such as saloon/sedan, coupé, estate/wagon and hatchback. It may be a styling cue used to tie together different models from the same manufacturer; collectively, the greenhouse and other "down the road graphics" are used to identify and distinguish individual models. A greenhouse which tapers from bottom to top with noticeably inwardly-sloping sides is also known as having tumblehome.

The "airiness" or "openness" of a greenhouse refers to the degree to which the vehicle emulates an open-air experience by surrounding its occupants with large glass areas, also considering the height of the beltline and the width of the pillars, with an extreme example like the Popemobile being nearly all glass. Styling trends tend to cycle between "airy" greenhouses and more "closed" greenhouses; for instance, concept and production cars in the late 1960s were cited as some of the most "airy" greenhouses ever, which repeated again in the 1980s and early 1990s. In the 2000s and 2010s greenhouses became smaller because of design trends pushing a higher beltline, which at least one journalist has traced back to the introduction of the Chrysler 300 and additional safety equipment to meet tighter crash regulations.

== Gallery ==
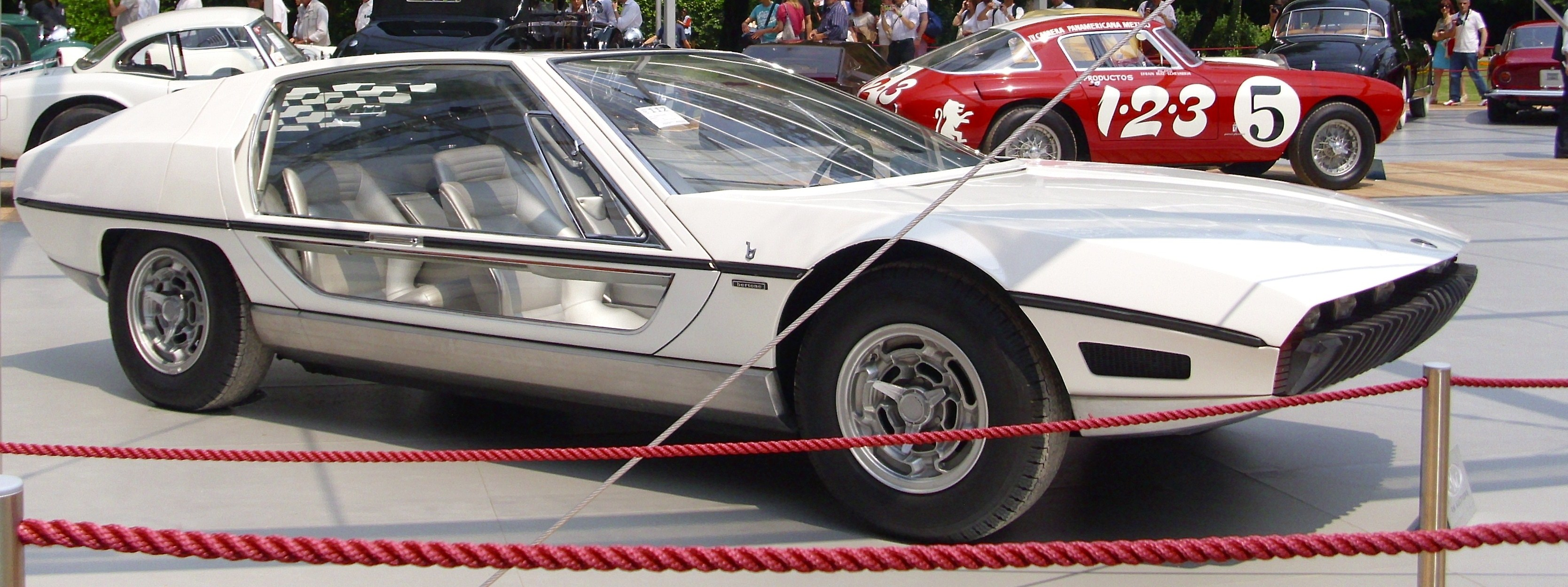
Lamborghini Marzal (1967): concept by Marcello Gandini with unusually low beltline

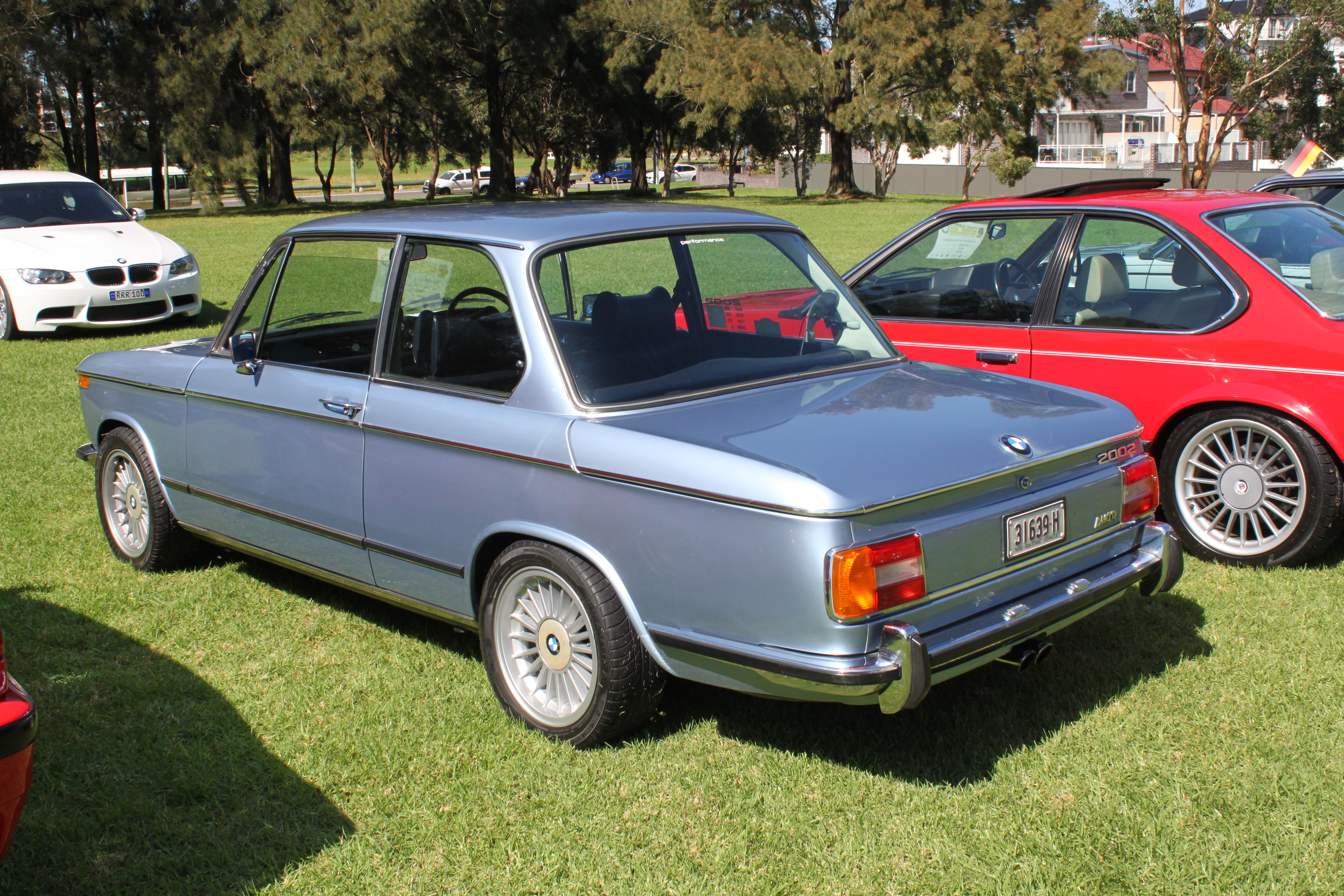
BMW 02 Series (1966–77): considered airy for the abundant glass and unobscured sight-lines

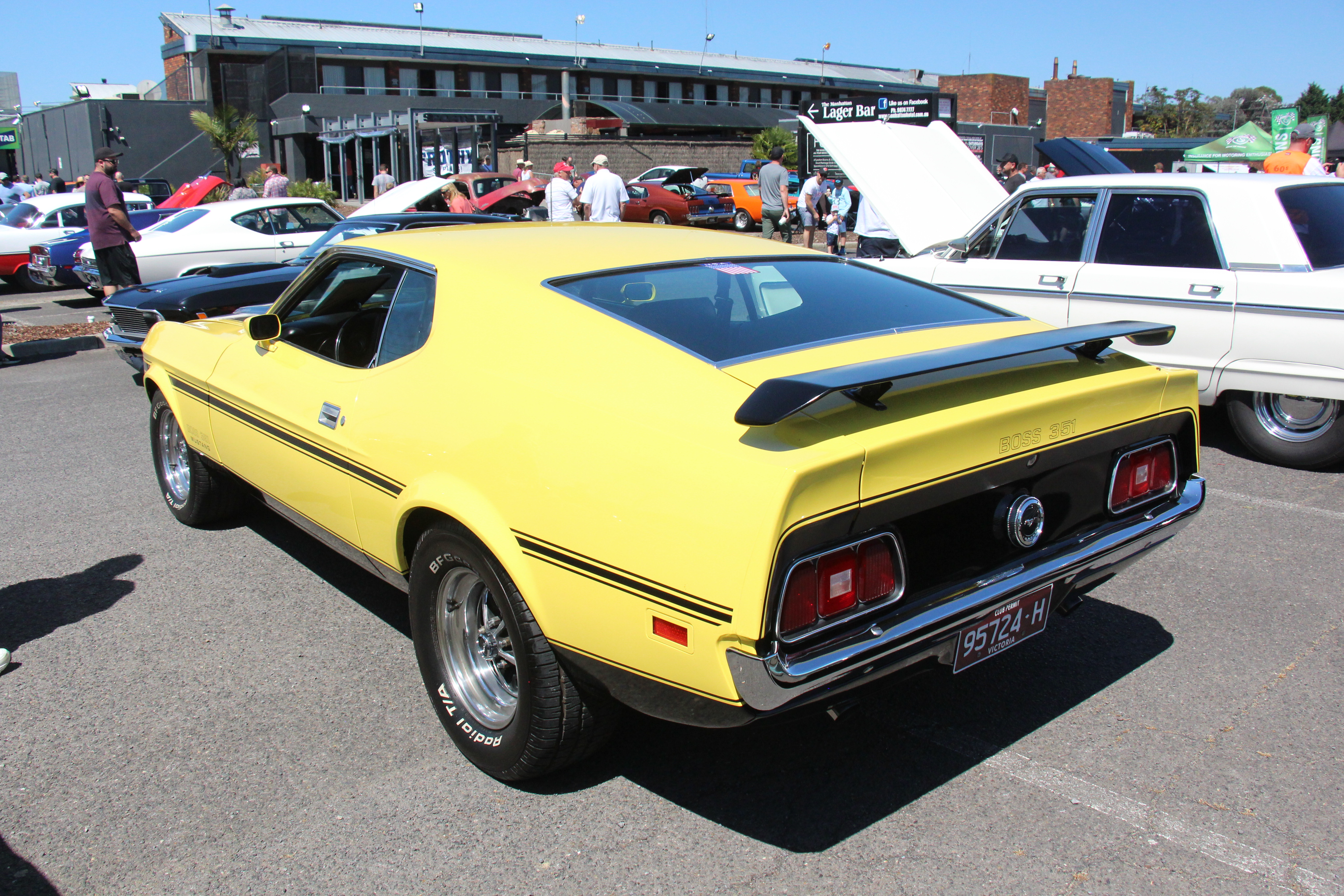
Ford Mustang (1971–73): high beltline, low roofline, and massive pillars

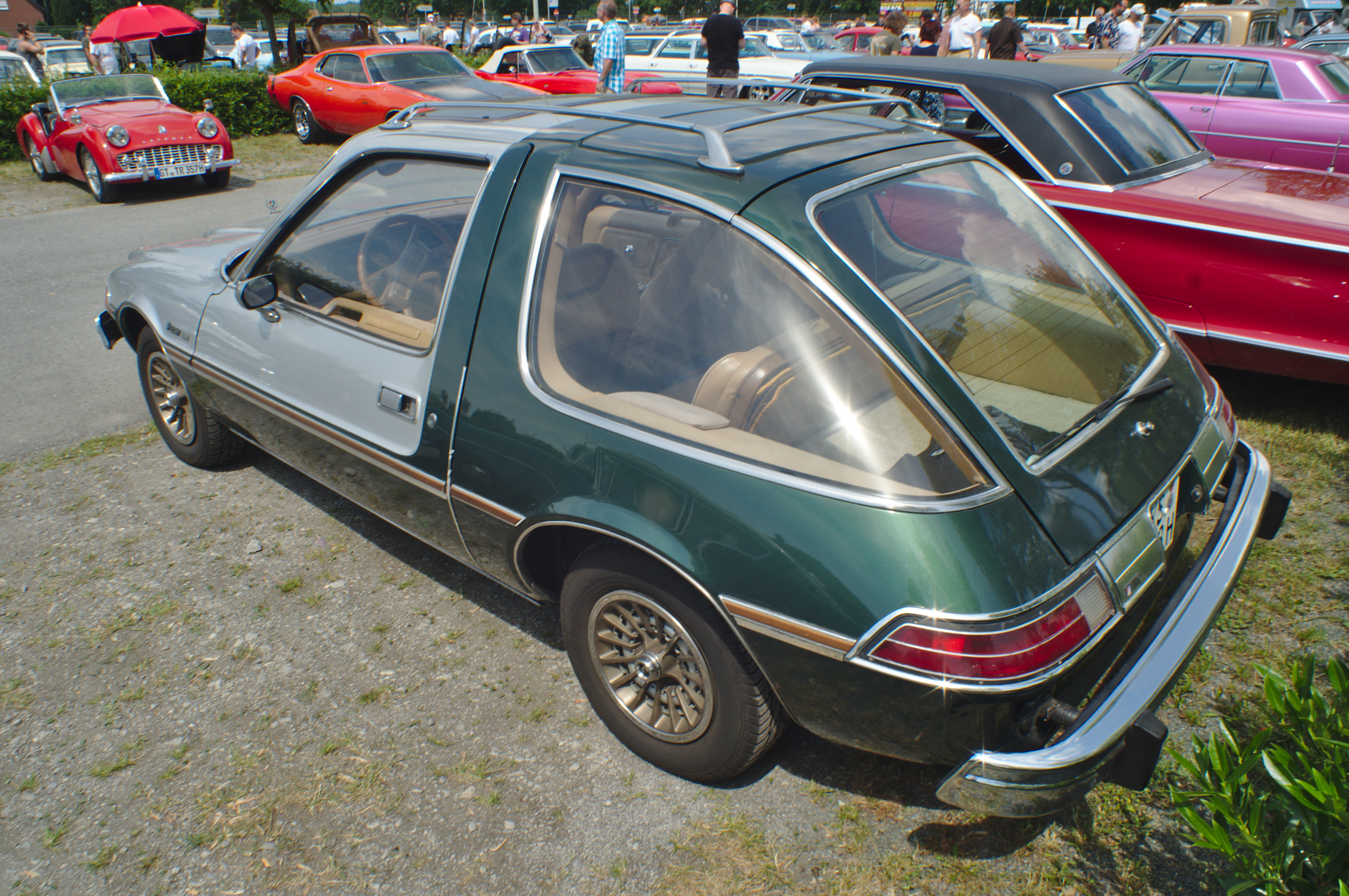
AMC Pacer (1975–80): Noted for its relatively large, curved glass areas

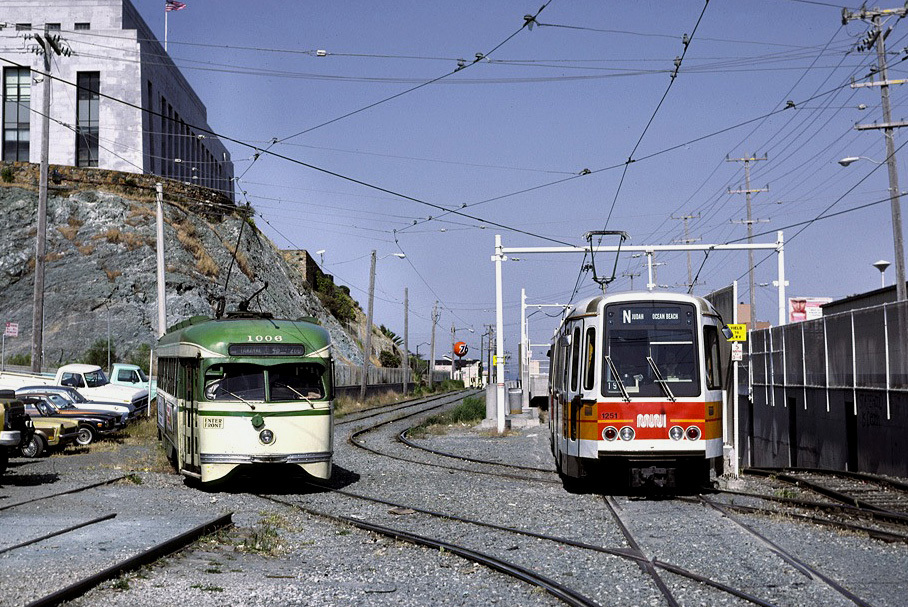
PCC streetcar (L, 1936–) & US SLRV (R, 1976–98) in Muni service: compare how window sizes have grown for transit vehicle greenhouses

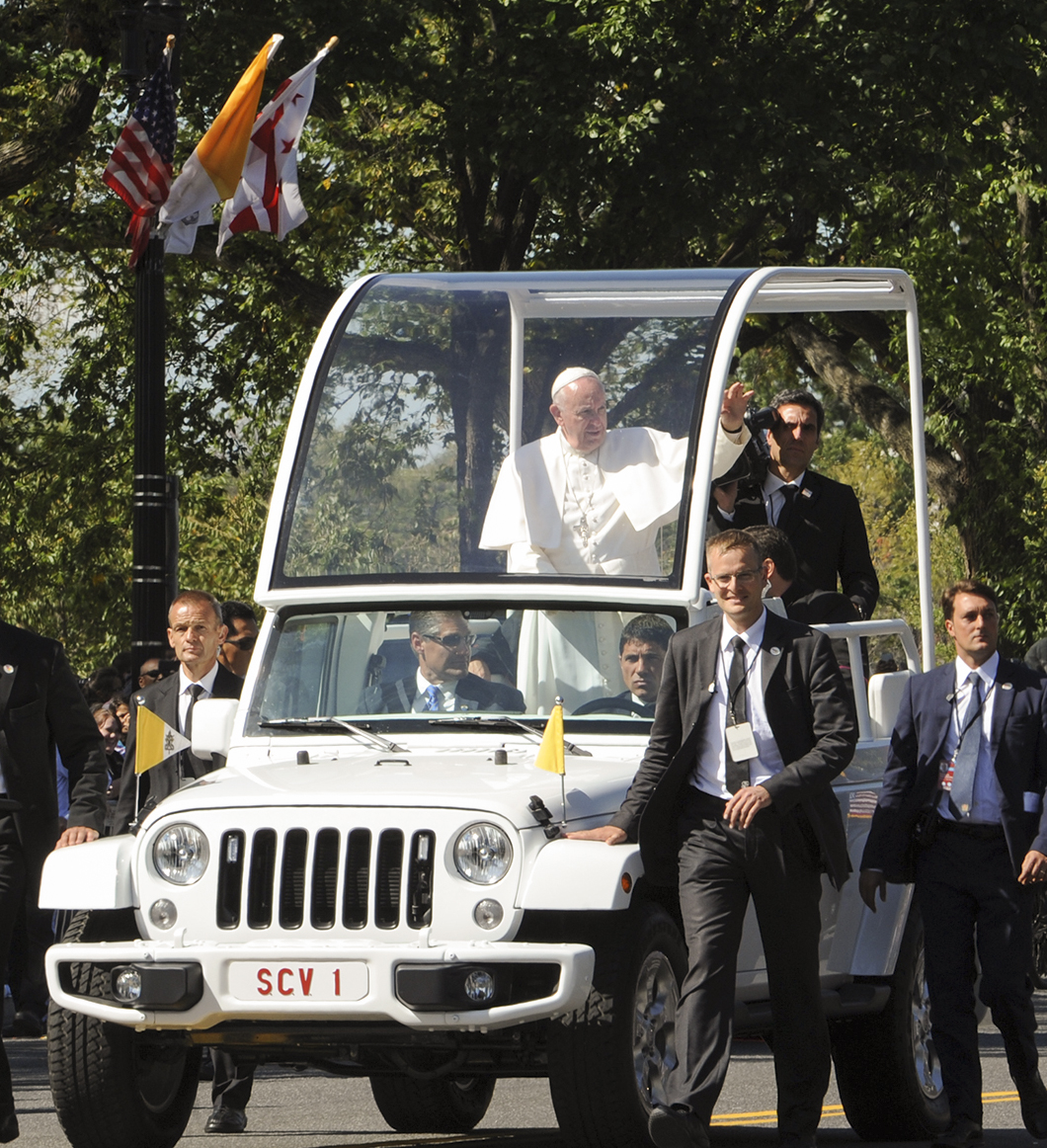
Popemobile based on Jeep Wrangler (JK) (2015): designed to maximize visibility of Pope Francis during visit to North America

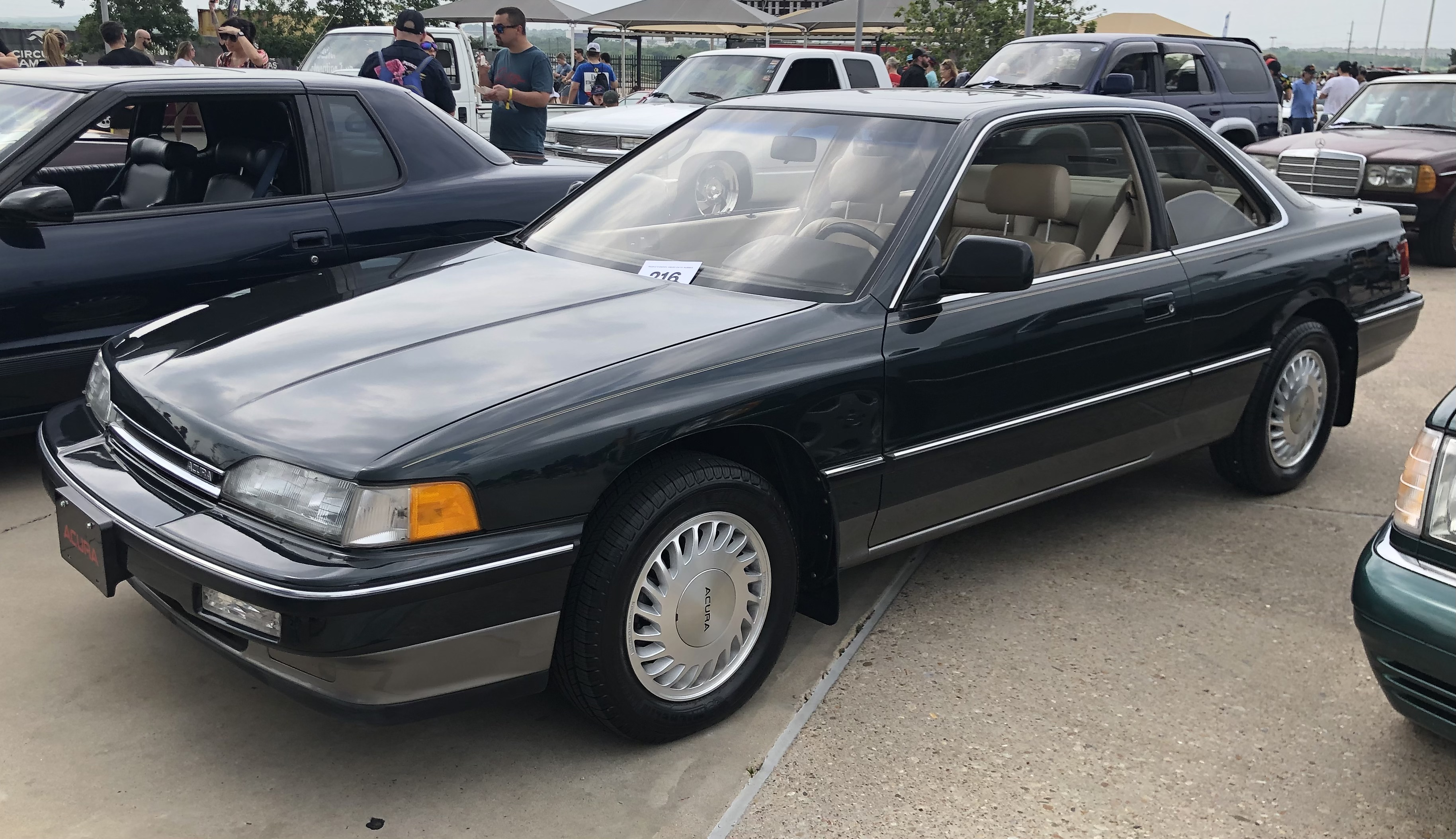
Honda Legend (1987-91): considered airy with low cowl, beltline, and thin pillars

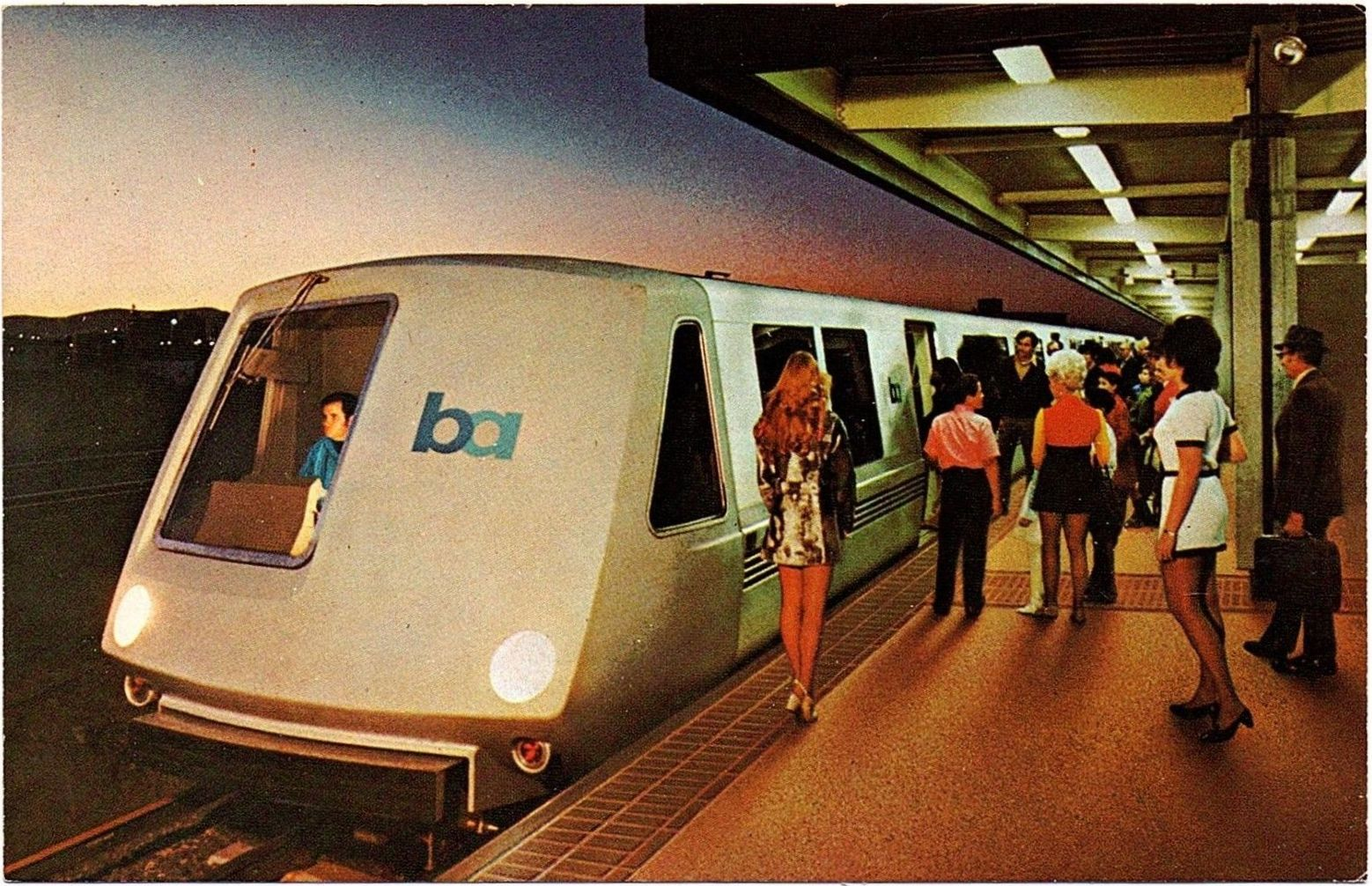
BART A-series (1968–2024): low beltline, large glass areas

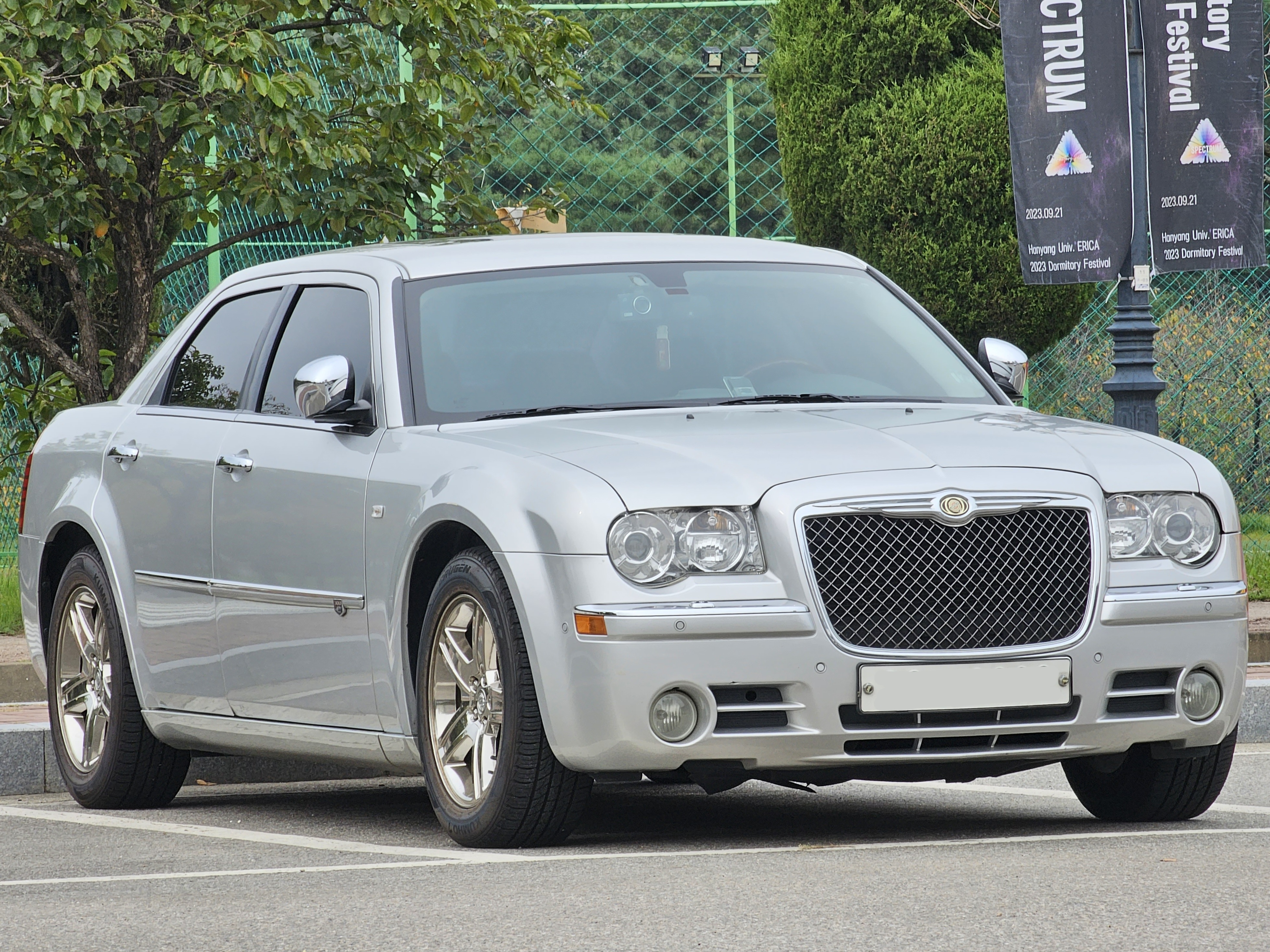
Chrysler 300 (2005–23): considered closed for its relatively high beltline and low roof

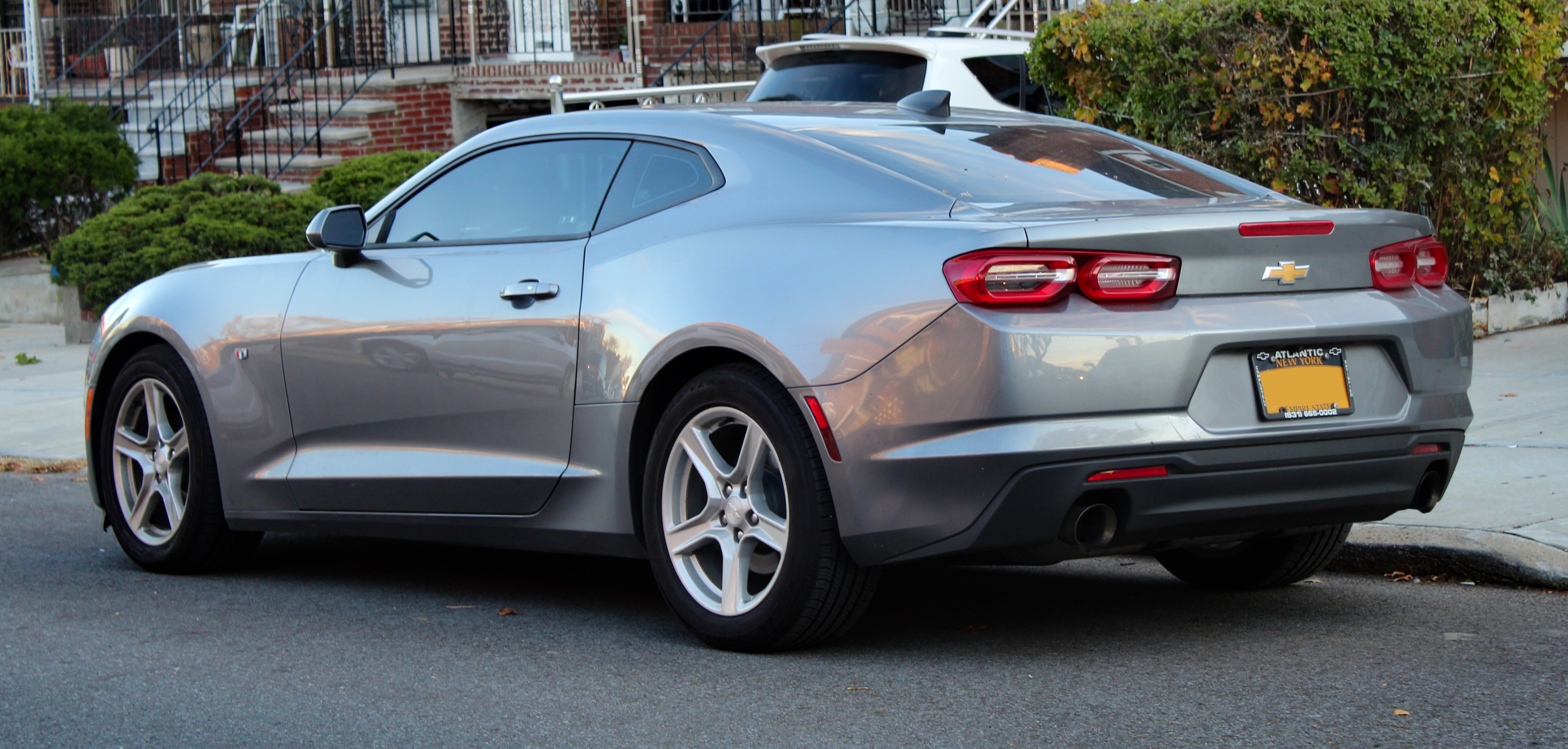
Chevrolet Camaro (2016–24): considered closed for its high beltline and thick pillars
