= Beltline (automotive) =

Line below the side windows on a car

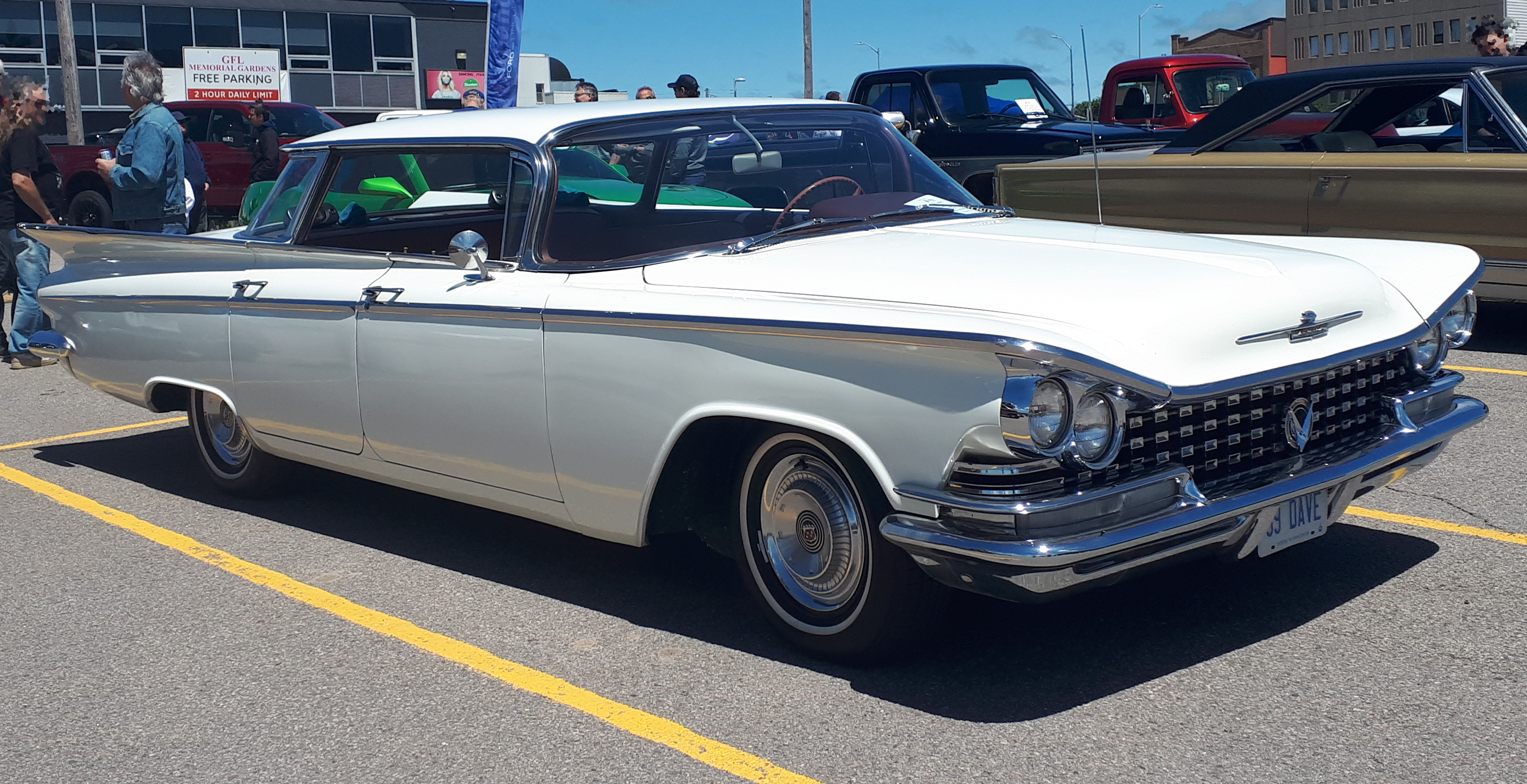
1959 Buick LeSabre with characteristic beltline surrounding the exterior

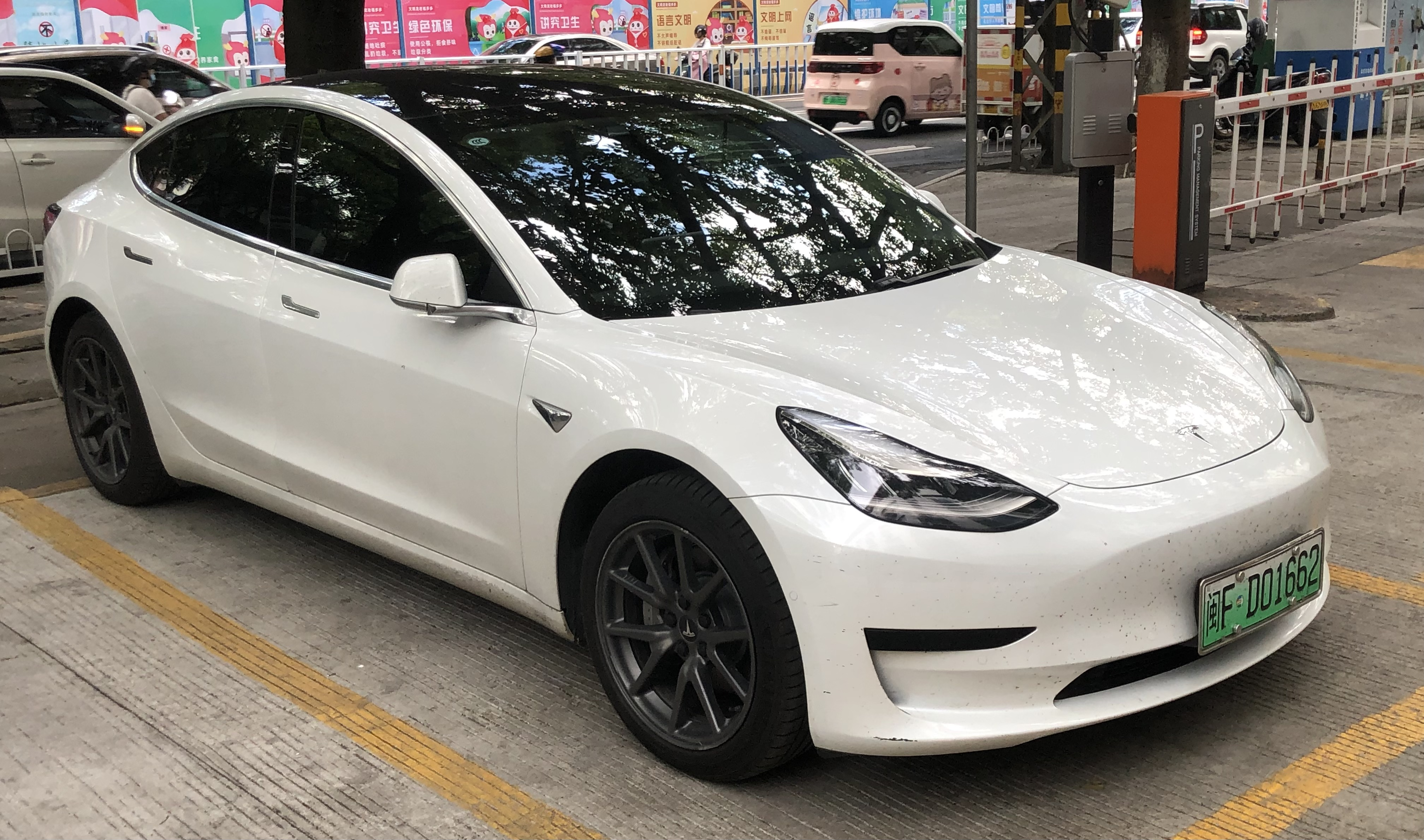
Tesla Model 3 with front hood character line flowing into side beltline

The beltline is a line representing the bottom edge of a vehicle's glass panels (e.g. windshield, side windows, and rear window). It also represents the bottom of a vehicle's greenhouse.
