= Honda CR-V (sixth generation) =

Compact crossover SUV manufactured by Honda

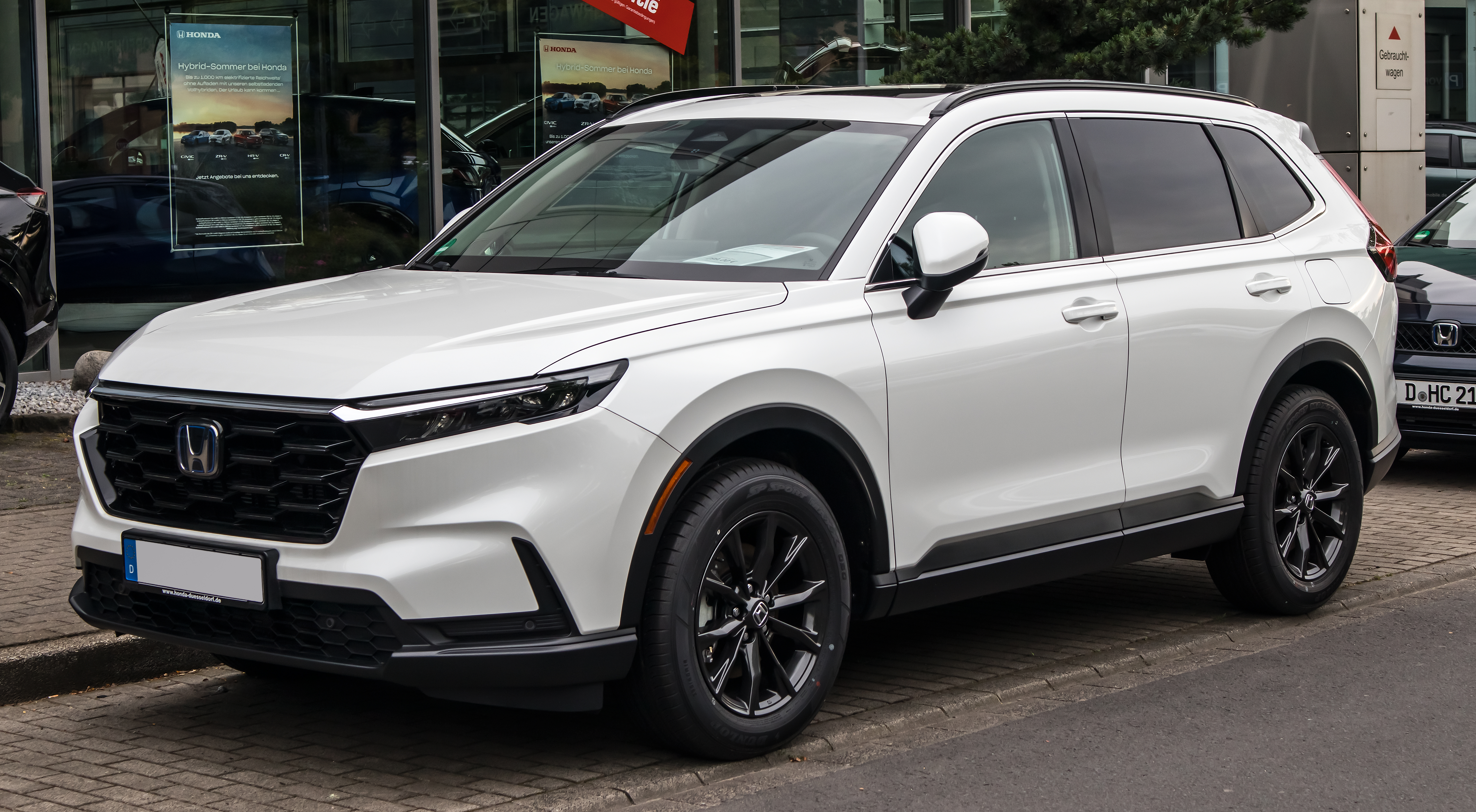
- 2024 Honda CR-V e:HEV Elegance

Overview
- Manufacturer: Honda
- Model code: RS; ZC8 (e:FCEV)
- Also called: Honda Breeze (China, GAC Honda)
- Production: September 2022 – present
- Model years: 2023–present
- Assembly: United States: East Liberty, Ohio (ELAP); Greensburg, Indiana (HMIN); Marysville, Ohio (CR-V e:FCEV); Canada: Alliston, Ontario (HCM); China: Wuhan, Hubei (Dongfeng Honda); Guangzhou, Guangdong (GAC Honda, Breeze); Taiwan: Pingtung; Thailand: Ayutthaya; Prachinburi; Malaysia: Alor Gajah, Melaka; Vietnam: Vĩnh Phúc
- Designer: Mitsuhiro Abe

Body and chassis
- Class: Compact crossover SUV
- Body style: 5-door SUV
- Layout: Front-engine, front-wheel-drive Front-engine, all-wheel-drive
- Platform: Honda HA
- Related: Acura ADX; Honda ZR-V/HR-V (RZ); Honda Civic (eleventh generation); Acura Integra (2023)

Powertrain
- Engine: Petrol: 1.5 L L15BE turbocharged I4 (RS3/4); Petrol hybrid: 2.0 L LFB51 I4 (RS5/6); 2.0 L LFC1 I4 (e:HEV Europe/China); Petrol plug-in hybrid: 2.0 L LFB51 I4; (e:PHEV)
- Electric motor: Permanent magnet synchronous (e:HEV, e:PHEV and e:FCEV)
- Transmission: CVT; e-CVT (hybrid versions); 1-speed fixed gear (e:FCEV)
- Hybrid drivetrain: Power-split hybrid (e:HEV); Plug-in hybrid (e:PHEV); Fuel cell plug-in hybrid (e:FCEV)
- Battery: 1.08 kWh lithium-ion (e:HEV); 17.7 kWh lithium-ion (e:PHEV and e:FCEV)
- Electric range: 82 km (51 mi) (e:PHEV); 29 mi (47 km) (e:FCEV)

Dimensions
- Wheelbase: 2,700 mm (106.3 in)
- Length: 4,694–4,703 mm (184.8–185.2 in); 4,765 mm (187.6 in) (e:FCEV); 4,716 mm (185.7 in) (Breeze)
- Width: 1,866 mm (73.5 in)
- Height: 1,682–1,690 mm (66.2–66.5 in)
- Curb weight: 4,460 lb (2,023 kg) (e:FCEV)

Chronology
- Predecessor: Honda CR-V (fifth generation)

The sixth-generation Honda CR-V is a compact crossover SUV manufactured by Honda since 2022, replacing the fifth-generation CR-V. Like its predecessor, the sixth-generation CR-V is available in 5-seater and 7-seater configurations (the 7-seater configuration is not available on 6th-generation CR-Vs sold in the Americas, Japan, and Europe). The sixth-generation CR-V is based on the Honda Architecture (HA) platform shared with the eleventh-generation Civic.

Aside from a 1.5-litre turbocharged petrol engine option, the sixth-generation CR-V is available with three electrified powertrains globally, which are the 2.0-litre petrol with e:HEV/Hybrid power-split hybrid, 2.0-litre petrol with e:PHEV plug-in hybrid, and e:FCEV plug-in hybrid fuel cell.

== Overview ==
The sixth-generation CR-V was officially unveiled on 12 July 2022. The prototype design and production process was done in Ontario, Canada before being shared to all Honda plants worldwide. Mass production of the sixth-generation CR-V started off at Honda's Canadian plant in Ontario in September 2022, with U.S. plants started its production shortly at a later date.

The sixth-generation CR-V is 69 mm (2.7 in) longer, with a 40 mm (1.6 in) longer wheelbase. The second-row seats received 15 mm (0.6 in) more legroom and can also recline up to 10.5 degrees. Similar to the eleventh-generation Civic, Honda opted for a longer hood for visual reasons by moving the A-pillars rearward by 119 mm (4.7 in). The base of the A-pillars has also been moved 71 mm (2.8 in) outward and sit 35.6 mm (1.4 in) lower than the previous CR-V.

Mechanical revisions compared to the preceding generation include a stiffer front subframe and repositioned steering rack to improve feel and accuracy. The rear subframe also gets stiffened to support the retuned multi-link suspension which features a 15 percent higher spring rate for the upper spring mount. The optional all-wheel drive system (marketed as Real Time AWD with Intelligent Control System), is capable of sending 50 percent of engine torque to the rear wheels for improved traction in slippery conditions such as in snow and mud. For the first time, the CR-V features a hill descent control system that increases off-road capability with more control on steep, slippery declines and drivers can select speeds under 19 km/h (12 mph).

Three electrified versions of the CR-V are available globally, which are e:HEV power-split hybrid (marketed simply as Hybrid in North America), e:PHEV plug-in hybrid, and e:FCEV plug-in hybrid fuel cell. The e:HEV/Hybrid was available since the model's introduction, which uses a 2.0-liter Atkinson cycle four-cylinder engine and e-CVT working with one or two electric motors and a 1.06 kWh lithium-ion battery for a total system output of 152 kW (204 hp; 207 PS). The CR-V e:PHEV debuted in China in April 2023 and has been exported to Europe. It is supplemented with a larger 17.7 kWh lithium-ion battery. The CR-V e:FCEV was unveiled in February 2024 at the H2 & FC Expo in Japan to be produced in the US for the American and Japanese markets.

A diesel engine option, previously available for the outgoing CR-V in some markets such as Europe, Thailand and the Philippines is no longer available.

Initially, the model was not offered in Japan (except for the limited number CR-V e:FCEV since 2024) due to low sales of the fifth-generation model, and was temporarily replaced by the smaller ZR-V. In 24 October 2025, the Japanese-market CR-V was reintroduced in 2025 Japan Mobility Show it was officially released in February 2026.

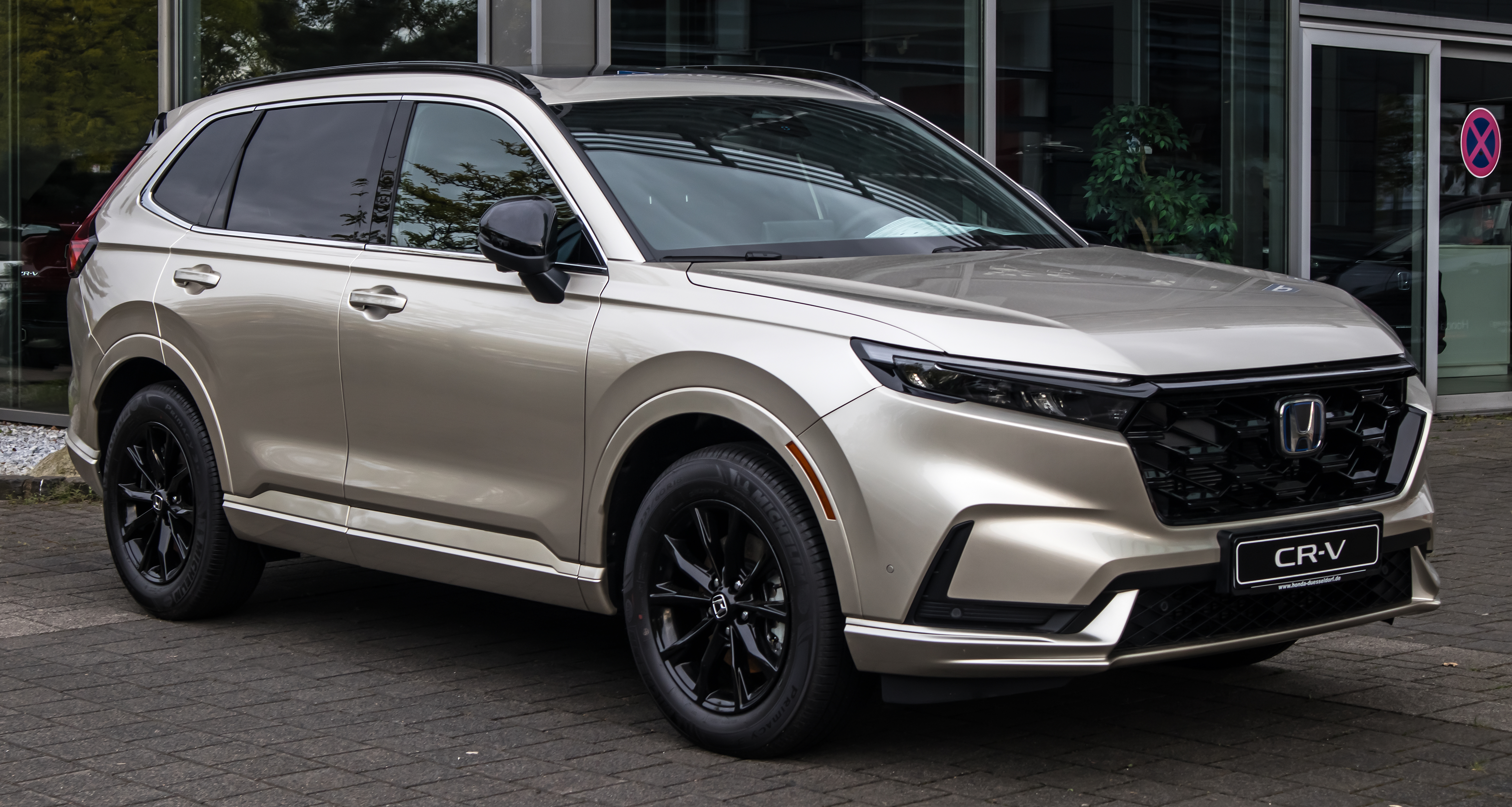
CR-V e:PHEV

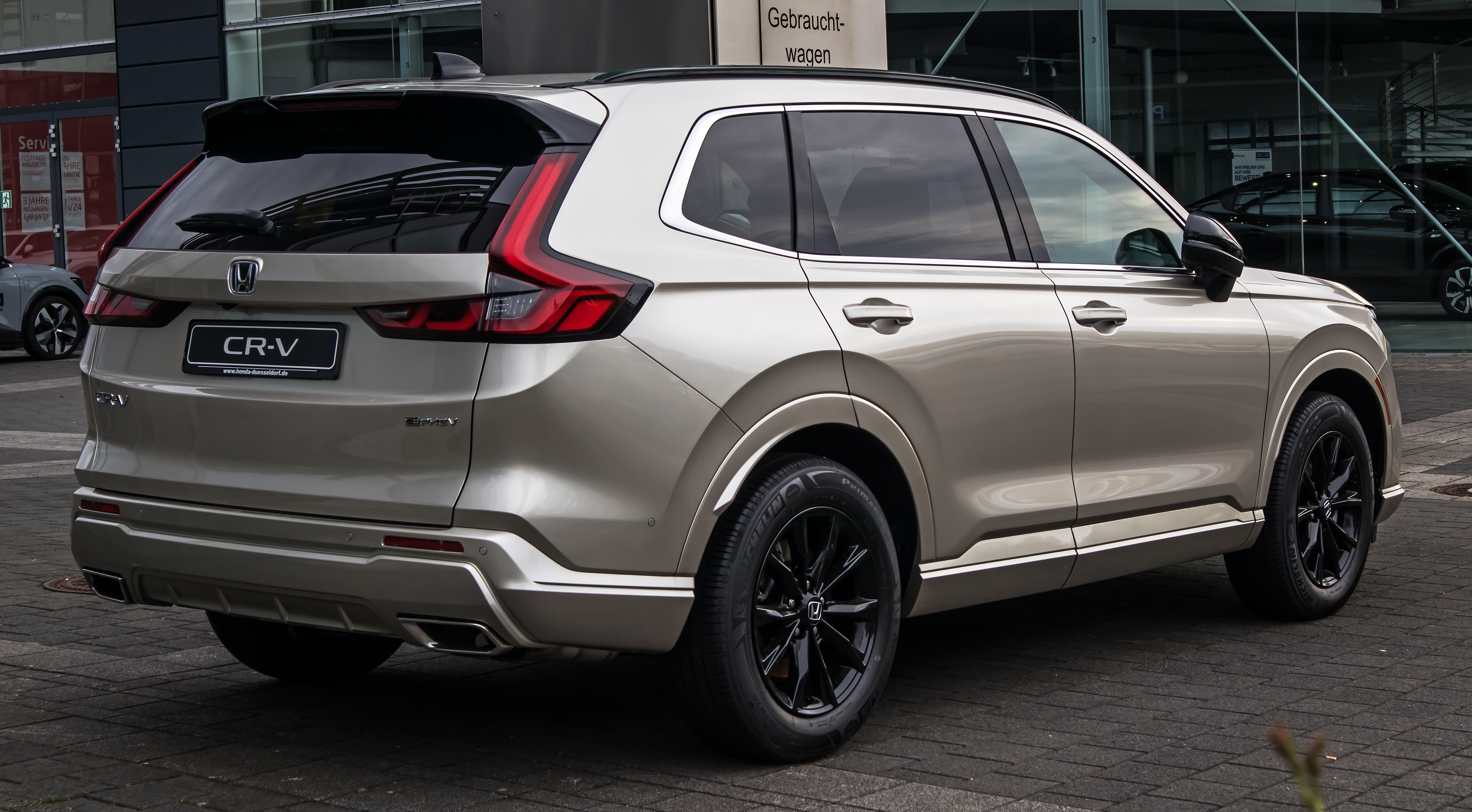
Rear view (e:PHEV)

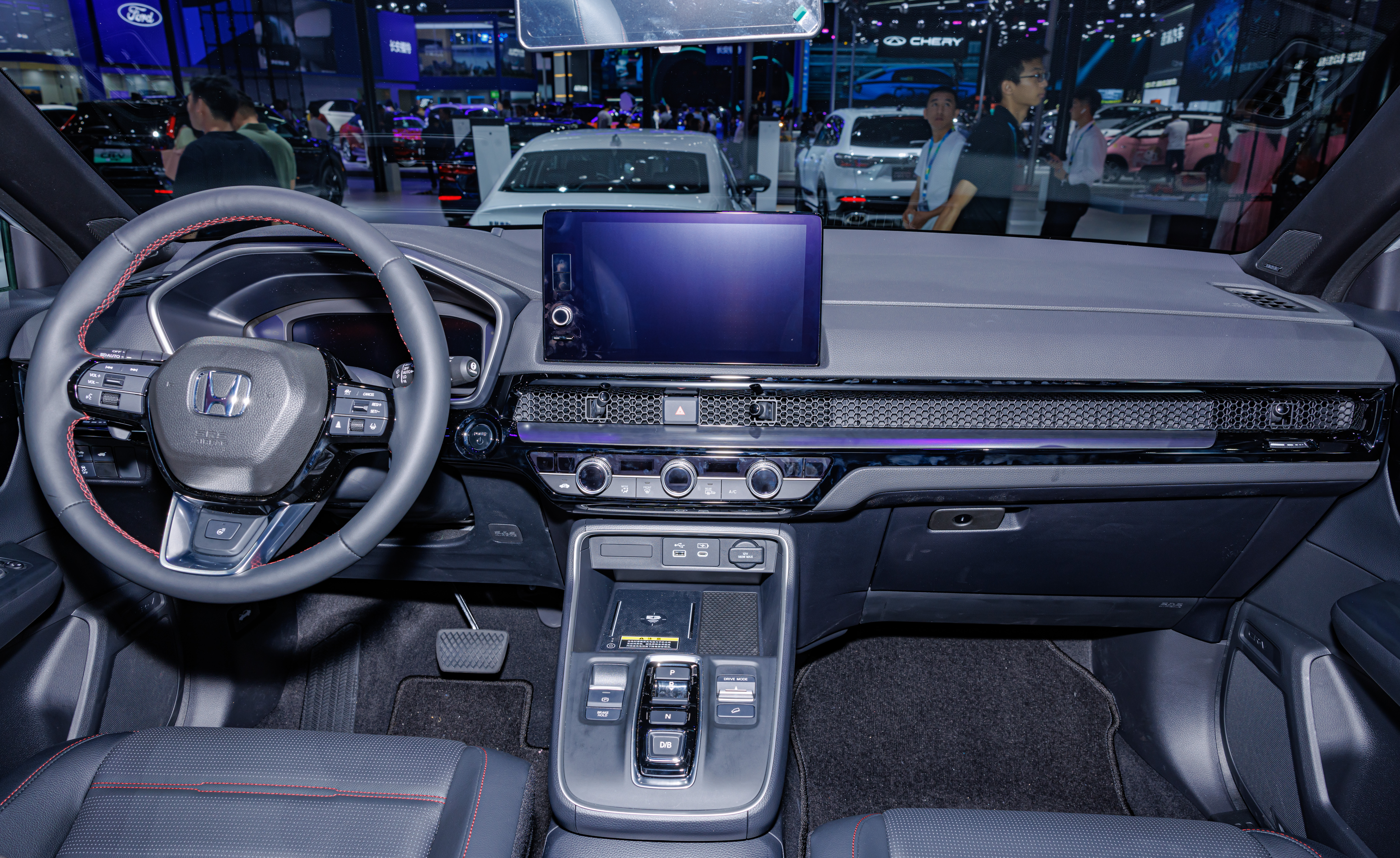
Interior

=== CR-V e:FCEV ===
In February 2024, Honda unveiled the CR-V e:FCEV in the US. It is a plug-in hybrid electric, fuel cell version of the CR-V that is equipped with a front-mounted electric motor, two high-pressure hydrogen tanks with a total capacity of 4.3 kg (9.5 lb), a 17.7 kWh battery with plug-in charging capability. It also has an EPA estimated driving range of 435 km (270 mi) and battery electric range of 47 km (29 mi). Compared to the regular CR-V, the e:FCEV model features a different front fascia similar to the Chinese market Breeze, clear lenses for the taillights and e:FCEV badging.

The CR-V e:FCEV commenced production at the Performance Manufacturing Center (PMC) plant in Marysville, Ohio on 5 June 2024. For the US market, the e:FCEV model is only available through leasing, and its availability is limited to 12 dealerships in the state of California. Honda includes hydrogen fuel credits as part of the lease agreement. It was also released in Japan in July 2024, with the same lease agreement.

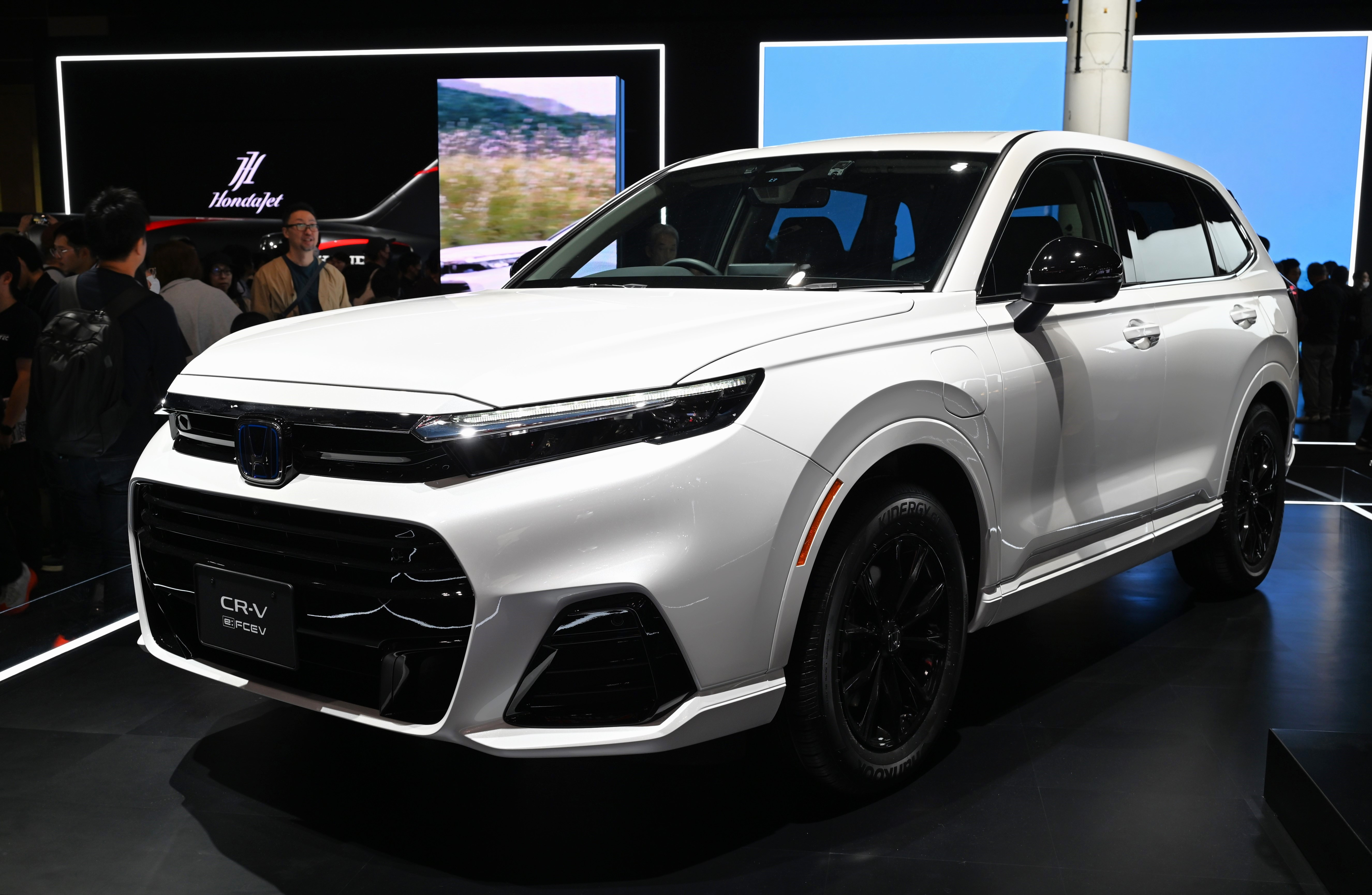
CR-V e:FCEV

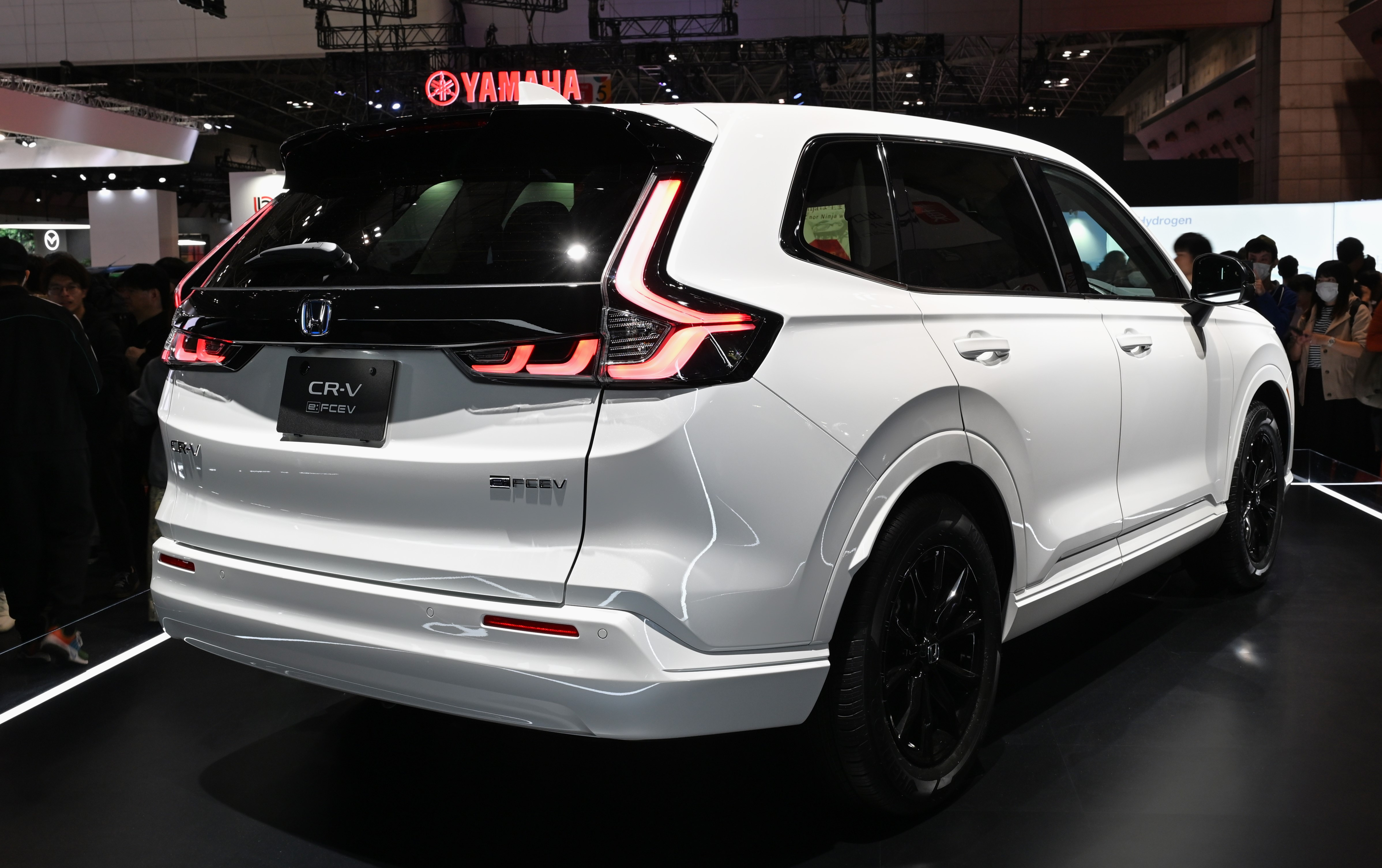
Rear view

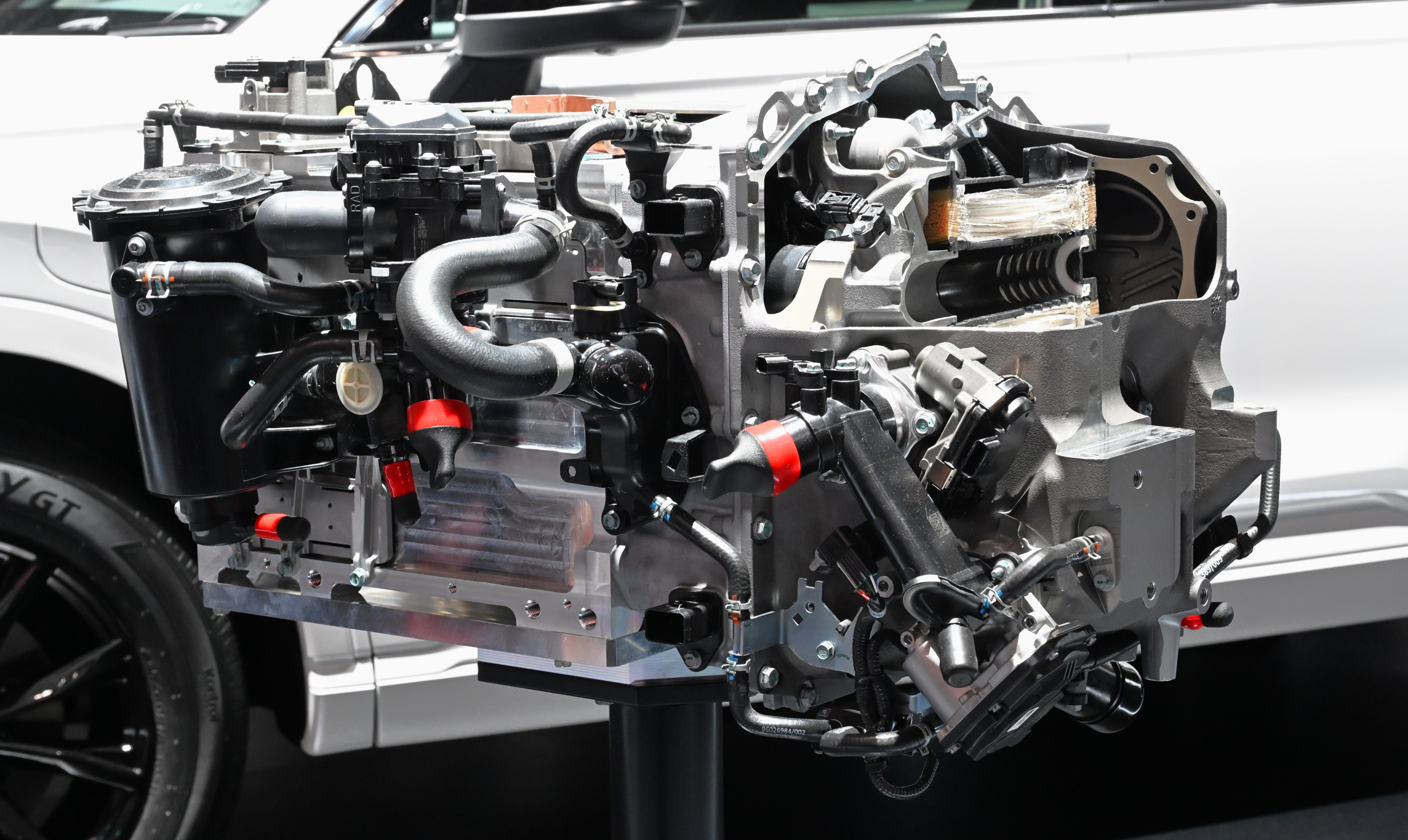
Powertrain

=== CR-V TrailSport ===
For the North American market, the TrailSport model for the CR-V was introduced in April 2025 for the 2026 model year. The TrailSport model features 18-inch Shark Gray alloy wheels in Continental CrossContact ATR all-terrain tires, black exterior trim accents, orange TrailSport badges on the grille and tailgate, rugged exterior styling, and silver skid plates on the front fascia. Inside, there are orange ambient lighting, orange contrast interior stitiching, and orange embroidered TrailSport logos on the floormats and front seat headrests. The TrailSport uses the 2.0 e:HEV hybrid powertrain and is equipped with the Honda Real Time AWD with Intelligent Control System.

== Markets ==
=== Africa ===
==== South Africa ====
The sixth-generation CR-V was launched in South Africa on 9 February 2024, in two trim levels: Executive and Exclusive, powered by a 1.5-litre turbocharged petrol engine. Both trims come in 7-seater configuration.

In October 2026, the e:HEV hybrid powertrain was introduced in South Africa in the sole RS trim replacing the non-hybrid variants.

=== East Asia ===
==== China ====
The sixth-generation CR-V is produced and sold in China by Dongfeng Honda. The plant that produces the sixth-generation CR-V for Dongfeng Honda is also responsible for the CR-V e:HEV and e:PHEV models sold in more than 20 European countries including United Kingdom, Ireland, Iceland, Greece, and Portugal. A variant with a different front and rear fascia is produced and sold by GAC Honda as the second-generation Honda Breeze, which was launched on 13 December 2022.

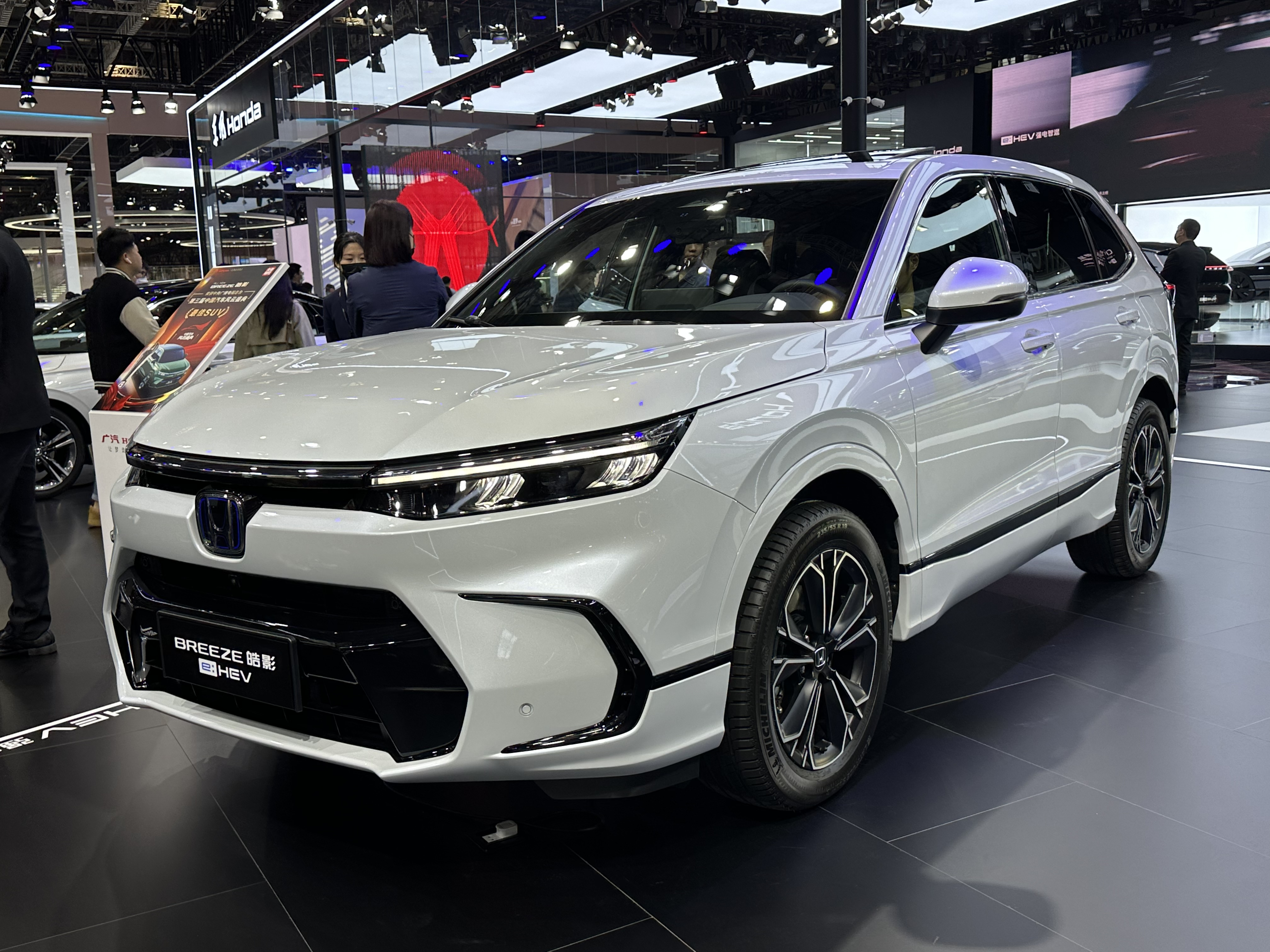
Honda Breeze (China; front)

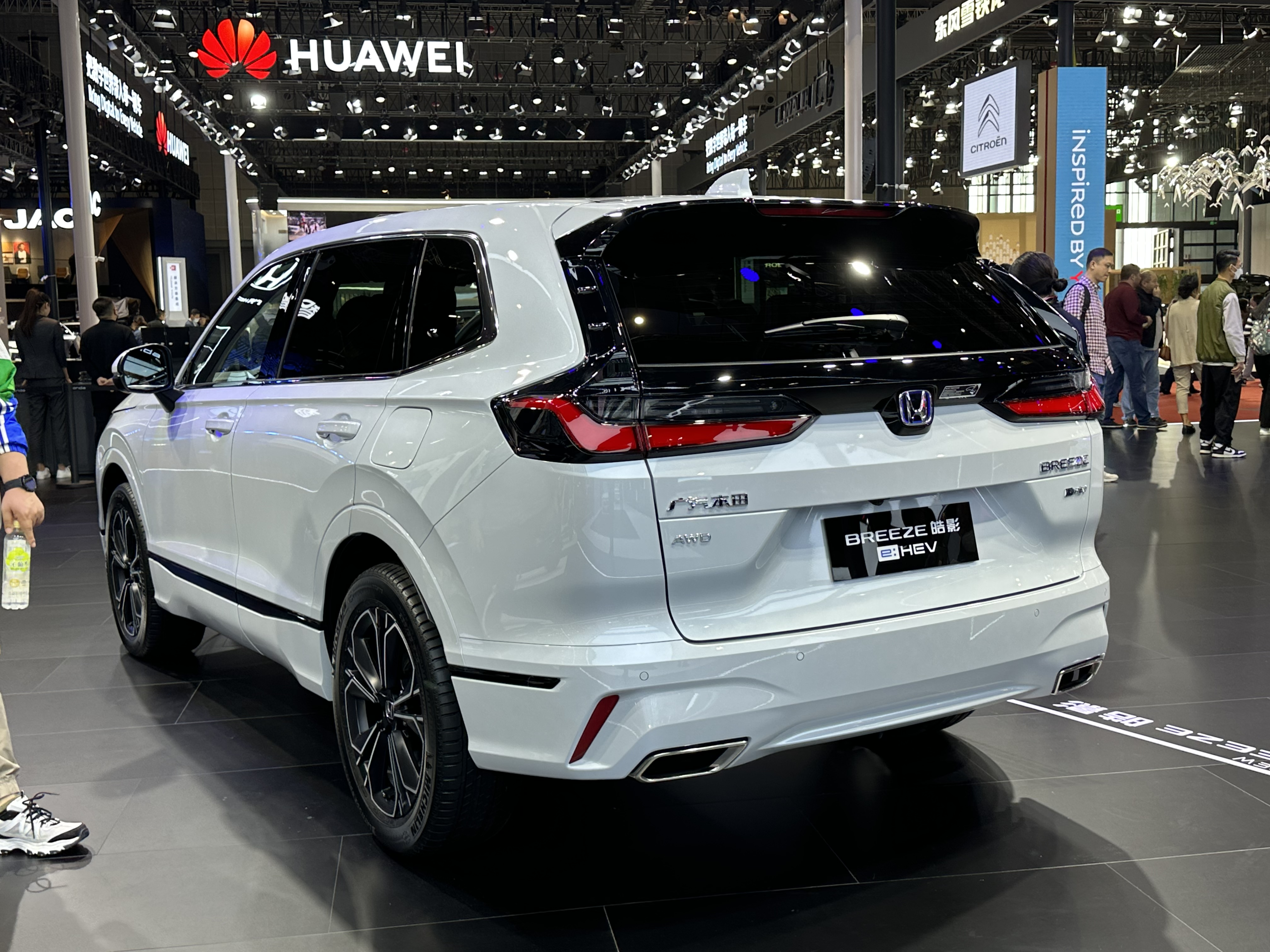
Honda Breeze (China; rear)

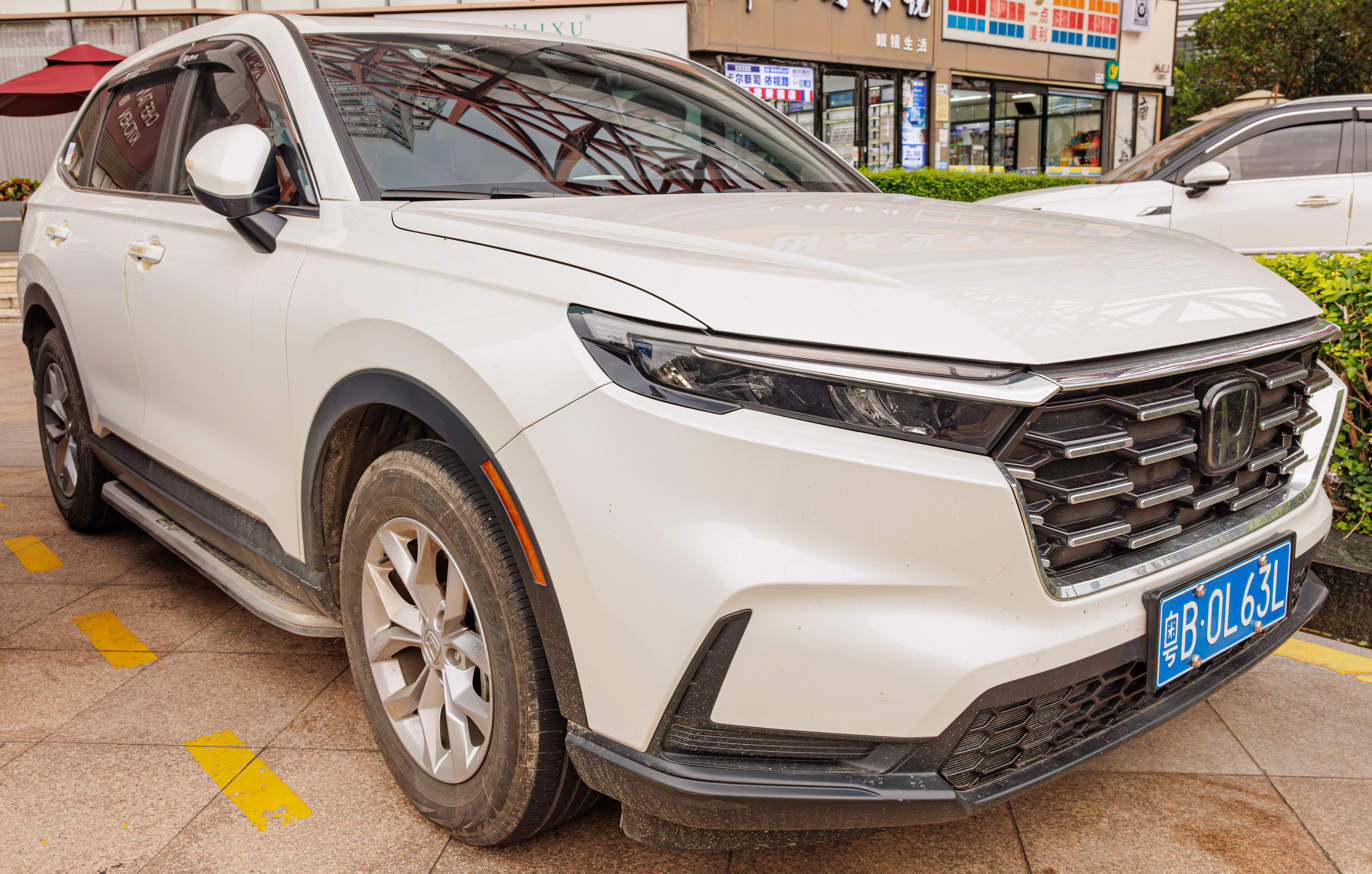
2025 Honda CR-V (China; front)

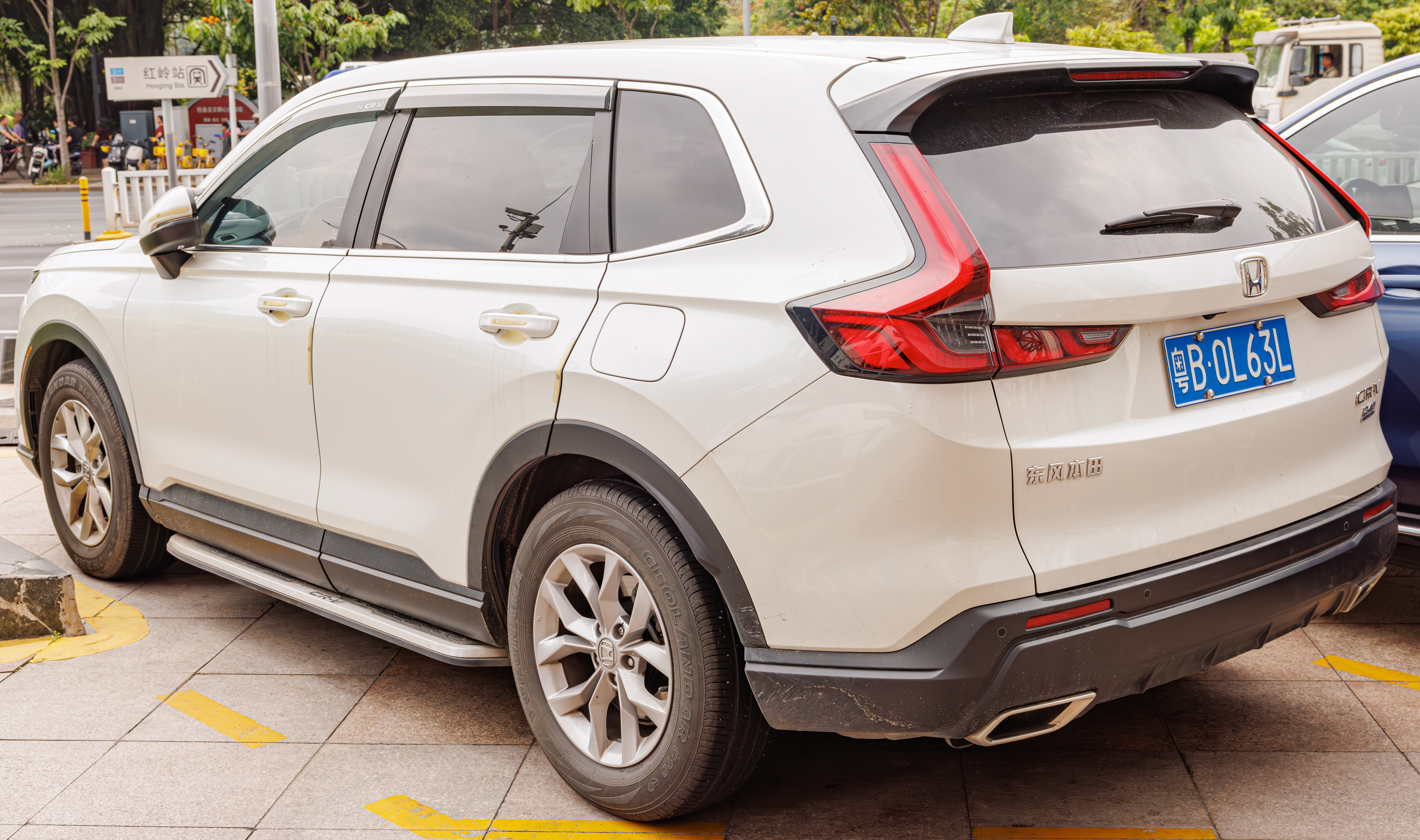
2025 Honda CR-V (China; rear)

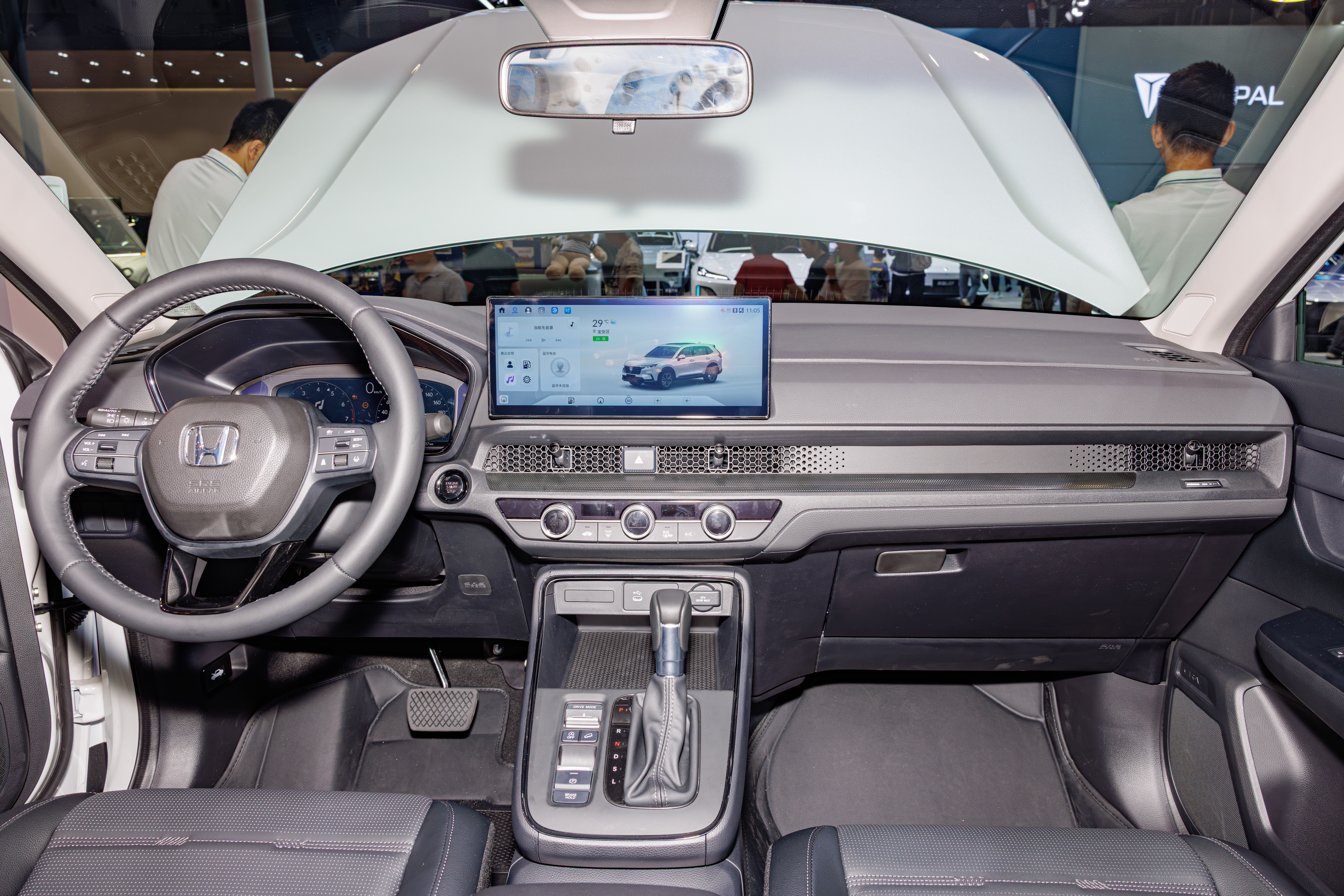
2025 Honda CR-V (China; Interior)

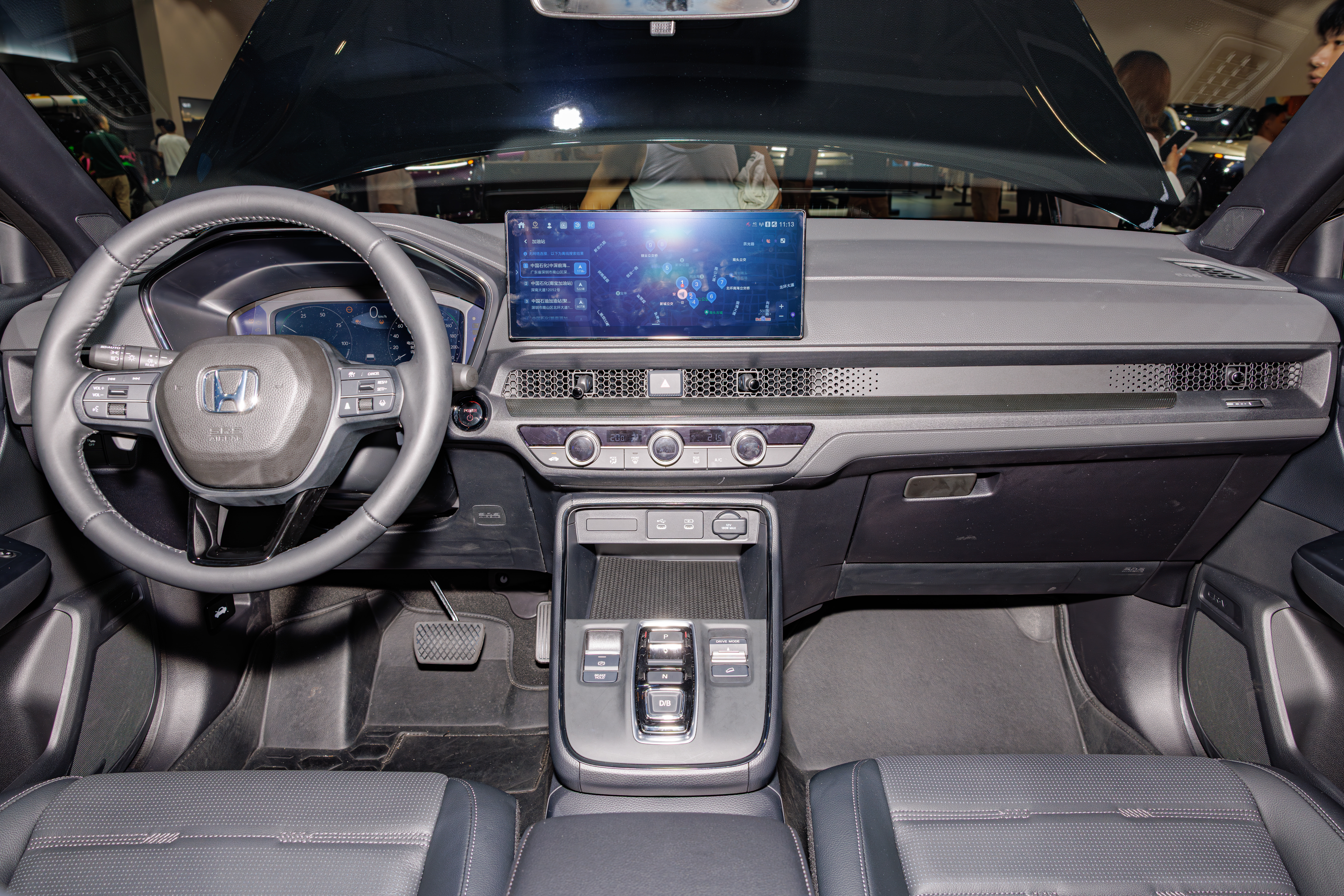
2025 Honda CR-V Hybrid (China; Interior)

==== Japan ====
The sixth-generation CR-V was launched in Japan on 26 February 2026, with two variants: e:HEV RS, and e:HEV RS Black Edition. Honda Sensing 360 standard on RS Black Edition. The Japanese-spec CR-V is only available with the e:HEV hybrid powertrain. The RS variant comes standard with front-wheel drive with all-wheel drive available as an option, while the Black Edition variant is only available with all-wheel drive. Unlike previous generations, the CR-V is imported from Thailand.

The CR-V e:FCEV was released in Japan in July 2024. The e:FCEV is only available for lease.

==== Taiwan ====
The sixth-generation CR-V was launched in Taiwan on 19 July 2023, with three variants: VTi-S, S, and Prestige. It is powered only by a 1.5-liter turbocharged petrol engine and Honda Sensing standard on all variants.

In June 2026, the e:HEV S and e:HEV Prestige variants powered by the 2.0-litre e:HEV hybrid were introduced in Taiwan to replace the Prestige non-hybrid variant.

=== Europe ===
For the European market, the sixth-generation CR-V was unveiled in Germany on 12 May 2023. Following Honda’s commitment to only offer electrified models in Europe, it is only available with the e:HEV hybrid and e:PHEV plug-in hybrid powertrains. It went on sale later in the UK on 10 August 2023, available in Elegance and Advance trim levels, the latter is offered with the 2.0L e:PHEV plug-in hybrid powertrain as an option.

=== Latin America ===
==== Argentina ====
The sixth-generation CR-V was launched in Argentina on 10 January 2024, with two grades at launch: LX (2WD) and EX (2WD), it is powered by the 1.5-litre turbocharged petrol and Honda Sensing is standard on all grades. In October 2024, the Advanced Hybrid variant was introduced in Argentina. In January 2025, the EXL (AWD) grade using the 1.5-litre turbocharged petrol engine was introduced to the line-up.

==== Brazil ====
The sixth-generation CR-V was launched in Brazil on 26 February 2024, after a two-year hiatus from the Brazilian market. It is available in the sole Advanced variant powered by the 2.0-litre e:HEV hybrid powertrain.

==== Mexico ====
The sixth-generation CR-V was launched in Mexico on 3 December 2022, with three variants: Turbo, Turbo Plus, and Touring. It is powered only by a 1.5-liter turbocharged petrol engine and Honda Sensing is standard only for the range topper Touring. In April 2023, the CR-V Hybrid Touring variant was released in Mexico.

The 2026 model year CR-V was released in Mexico on 22 August 2025, with changes to equipment and trim levels. The 2026 model year CR-V was available with four variants: Turbo Plus, Touring, Touring Hybrid and Sport Touring Hybrid.

=== Middle East ===
The sixth generation CR-V was launched in the Middle East on 15 November 2023, powered by a 1.5 turbo engine paired with a CVT, available in four trim levels: DX, EX, LX, and Touring. Honda Sensing is standard on all trim levels.

=== North America ===
The sixth-generation CR-V went on sale in September 2022 for the 2023 model year in the U.S. The U.S. model initially offered in EX, EX-L, Sport, and Sport Touring trim levels, with the hybrid powertrain standard on the Sport and Sport Touring trims. All variants are available in front-wheel drive or all-wheel drive, except the Sport Touring which is all-wheel drive only. The LX trim was later introduced in 2023 during the 2023 model year as the base model of CR-V in the U.S. In June 2023, for the 2024 model year, Honda offered a Sport-L hybrid trim, priced under the Sport Touring trim.

The Canadian model is offered in LX, Sport, EX-L, and Touring trims, with the Touring having the hybrid powertrain. The Canadian Sport trim is largely identical to the U.S. gas-only EX albeit for cosmetic differences. All variants come standard with all-wheel drive, although the base LX is also offered with front-wheel drive. In June 2023, for the 2024 model year, a EX-L hybrid trim (identical to the U.S. Sport-L) was added whose price slots under the Sport Touring. In May 2024, for the 2025 model year, the gasoline-only EX-L trim has been dropped.

=== Oceania ===
==== Australia ====
The sixth-generation CR-V went on sale in Australia on 1 September 2023, imported from Thailand, in four trim levels: X, L, LX, and RS. It is powered by either a 1.5-liter turbocharged petrol engine, or the 2.0-litre e:HEV hybrid powertrain exclusive for the RS trim. The 7-seater version is available for the X and LX trims, and an all-wheel drive (AWD) option for the L and LX trims. In March 2026, the CR-V line-up in Australia was updated with the e:HEV hybrid powertrain made available for the X, L and LX trims. In addition, the VTi X7, VTi L FWD, VTi L AWD and VTi LX AWD variants were discontinued.

==== New Zealand ====
The sixth-generation CR-V went on sale in New Zealand in October 2023, with three variants: Sport AWD, Sport 7 (7-seater), and RS. It is powered by either a 1.5-liter turbocharged petrol engine, or the 2.0-litre e:HEV hybrid powertrain exclusive for the range-topper RS. In February 2026, the CR-V line-up in New Zealand was updated and the 2026 model year CR-V is available with four variants: X 2WD Petrol, L AWD Petrol, Hybrid X, and Hybrid RS AWD.

=== Southeast Asia ===
==== Brunei ====
The sixth-generation CR-V was launched in Brunei on 24 August 2023. It is available in the sole grade which is powered by a 1.5-litre turbocharged petrol engine and Honda Sensing becomes standard.

==== Indonesia ====
The sixth-generation CR-V was launched at the 30th Gaikindo Indonesia International Auto Show on 10 August 2023. It is available with two grades: 1.5 Turbo and 2.0 RS e:HEV. Unlike previous models, this generation is imported from Thailand instead of being assembled locally. In February 2026, the entry-level e:HEV hybrid variant was introduced at the 33rd Indonesia International Motor Show and the 1.5-litre turbocharged petrol engine was discontinued, therefore the CR-V line-up became hybrid-only in Indonesia.

==== Malaysia ====
The sixth-generation CR-V was launched in Malaysia on 14 December 2023, with three grades: S, E and V AWD, powered by a 1.5-litre turbocharged petrol engine. Additionally, the 2.0 e:HEV RS variant was released a month later on 11 January 2024. Honda Sensing is standard for all grades. As the eleventh generation Honda Accord is not entering the Malaysian market, the CR-V became the flagship product of Honda in the market. On 6 November 2024, a proactive product update was issued to CR-V models manufactured in 2024 that may cause potential issues with the Electric Power Steering gearbox.

In March 2026, the e:HEV E grade was introduced to replace the Turbo E and also became the entry-level variant, hence the discontinuation of the S grade.

==== Philippines ====
The sixth-generation CR-V was launched in the Philippines on 13 September 2023. It is available in three grades: 1.5 Turbo V, 1.5 Turbo VX (both are seven-seater) and 2.0 RS e:HEV (in standard five-seater). Honda Sensing is standard for all grades. In February 2026, the Turbo VX was replaced by the VX e:HEV and all-wheel drive became standard for the flagship RS e:HEV.

==== Singapore ====
The sixth-generation CR-V was launched in Singapore on 11 January 2024, it is powered by a 1.5-litre turbocharged petrol, available in 5-seater and 7-seater configurations.

==== Thailand ====
The sixth-generation CR-V made its ASEAN debut in Thailand on 20 March 2023, two days prior to the 44th Bangkok International Motor Show. It is available with five variants: E, ES 4WD, EL 4WD, e:HEV ES and e:HEV RS 4WD. In November 2025, the e:HEV HuNT and e:HEV RS 2WD variants were added to the line-up and also the CR-V line-up became hybrid-only for all variants in Thailand.

==== Vietnam ====
The sixth-generation CR-V was launched in Vietnam on 25 October 2023, with four grades: 1.5 G, 1.5 L, 1.5 L AWD and 2.0 RS e:HEV. Similar to Southeast Asian markets, the Vietnamese-spec CR-V is offered in two seating configurations: 7-seater for petrol models and 5-seater for e:HEV model. The petrol versions are assembled locally in Honda Cars Vietnam factory in Vĩnh Phúc, while the e:HEV hybrid version initially imported from Thailand. Honda Sensing is standard for all trim levels.

In February 2026, the e:HEV hybrid model became locally assembled in Vietnam and also coincided with the introduction of the e:HEV L variant.

== Powertrain ==
| Engine | Chassis Codes | Power | Torque |
|---|---|---|---|
| 1.5 L L15BE I4 turbo petrol | RS3/RS4 | 139 kW; 190 PS (187 hp) at 6,000 rpm | 243 N⋅m (179 lb⋅ft) at 1,700-5,000 rpm |
| 1.5 L L15C2 I4 turbo petrol (Thailand) | RS3/RS4 | 139 kW; 190 PS (187 hp) at 6,000 rpm | 240 N⋅m (177 lb⋅ft) at 1,700-5,000 rpm |
| 2.0 L LFB51 I4 hybrid petrol | RS5/RS6 | 109 kW; 148 PS (146 hp) at 6,100 rpm (engine) 135 kW; 184 PS (181 hp) (electric motor) | 188 N⋅m (139 lb⋅ft) at 4,500 rpm (engine) 335 N⋅m (247 lb⋅ft) (electric motor) |
| 2.0 L LFB16 I4 plug-in hybrid petrol | | 109 kW; 148 PS (146 hp) at 6,100rpm (engine) 135 kW; 184 PS (181 hp) (electric motor) | 188 N⋅m (139 lb⋅ft) at 4,500 rpm (engine) 335 N⋅m (247 lb⋅ft) (electric motor) |
| 1x MCF91 AC Synchronous electric motor (e:FCEV) | ZC8 | 130 kW; 176 PS (174 hp) | 310 N⋅m (229 lb⋅ft) |

== Safety ==
IIHS scores
| Small overlap front (driver) | Good |
| Small overlap front (passenger) | Good |
| Moderate overlap front (original test) | Good |
| Moderate overlap front (updated test) | Poor |
| Side (updated test) | Good |
| Headlights | Good |
| Front crash prevention: vehicle-to-vehicle | Acceptable |
| Front crash prevention: vehicle-to-pedestrian (Day) | Superior |
| Front crash prevention: vehicle-to-pedestrian (Night) | Advanced |
| Seat belt reminders | Good |
| Child seat anchors (LATCH) ease of use | Acceptable |

Euro NCAP test results Honda CR-V 2.0 e:HEV Elegance/Executive (2024)
| Test | Points | % |
|---|---|---|
| Overall: | 4 /5 stars | |
| Adult occupant: | 34.2 | 85% |
| Child occupant: | 42.2 | 86% |
| Pedestrian: | 48.5 | 76% |
| Safety assist: | 12.1 | 67% |

ASEAN NCAP test results Honda CR-V (2023)
| Test | Points |
|---|---|
| Overall: | 5 /5 stars |
| Adult occupant: | 39.31 |
| Child occupant: | 17.97 |
| Safety assist: | 18.57 |
| Motorcyclist Safety: | 11.32 |

ANCAP test results Honda CR-V (2024, aligned with Euro NCAP)
| Test | Points | % |
|---|---|---|
| Overall: | 5 /5 stars | |
| Adult occupant: | 35.23 | 88% |
| Child occupant: | 43.25 | 88% |
| Pedestrian: | 48.48 | 76% |
| Safety assist: | 12.26 | 68% |

TNCAP (1.0) test result Honda CR-V VTi-S (2024, similar to Euro NCAP 2017)
| Test | Points | % |
|---|---|---|
| Overall: | 5/5 stars | |
| Adult occupant: | 37.096 | 97% |
| Child occupant: | 44 | 89% |
| Pedestrian: | 31.515 | 75% |
| Safety assist: | 8.326 | 69% |
