= Acura ADX =

Compact luxury crossover SUV

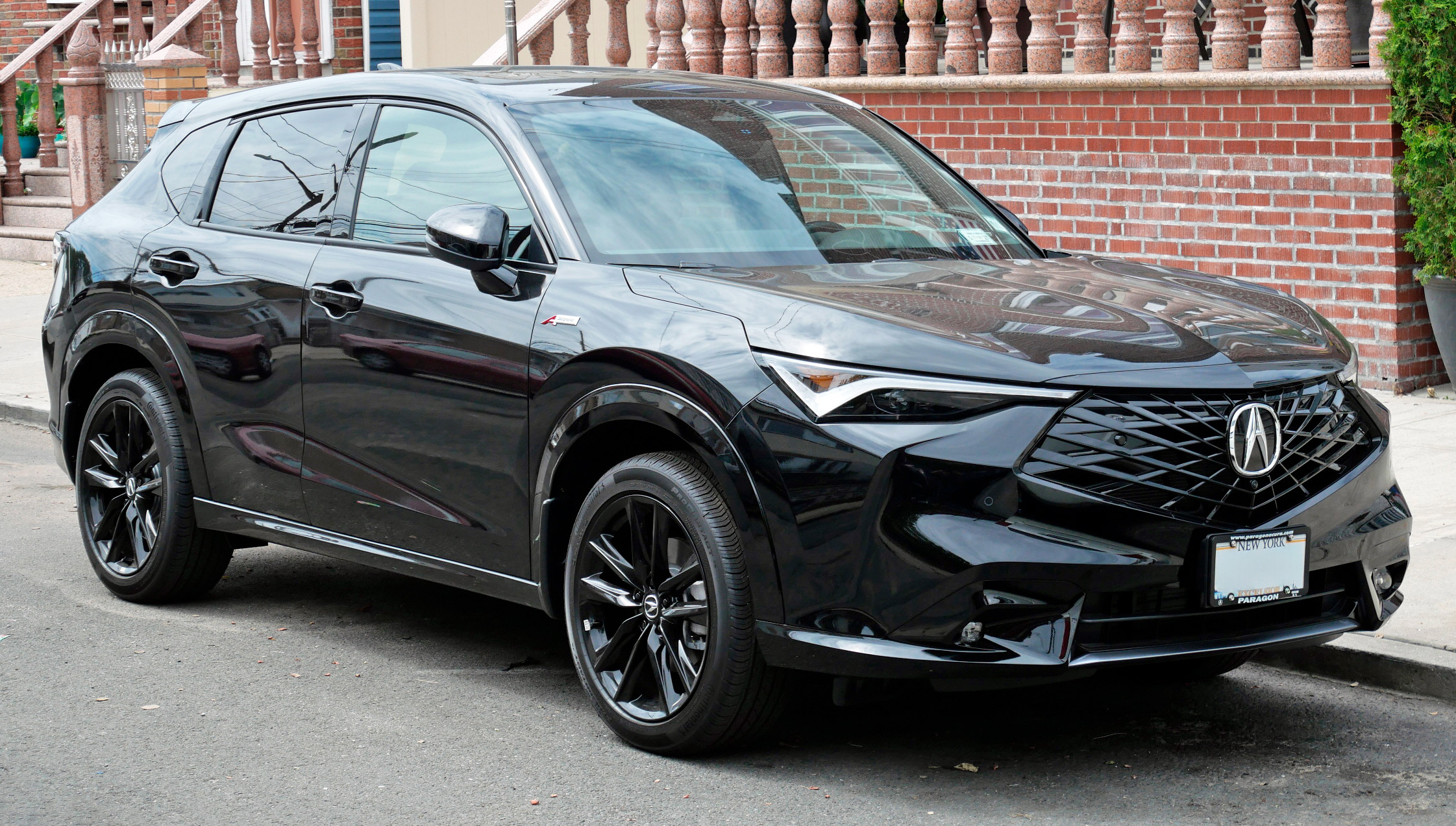
- 2025 Acura ADX A-Spec

Overview
- Manufacturer: Honda
- Model code: SA1/SA2
- Production: 2025–present
- Model years: 2025–present
- Assembly: Mexico: Celaya

Body and chassis
- Class: Subcompact luxury crossover SUV (c)
- Body style: 5-door SUV
- Layout: Front-engine, front-wheel-drive; Front-engine, all-wheel-drive
- Platform: Honda Architecture (HA)
- Related: Honda ZR-V/HR-V; Acura Integra (2023); Honda Civic (eleventh generation); Honda CR-V (sixth generation)

Powertrain
- Engine: Gasoline: 1.5 L L15BE DOHC VTEC Turbo I4
- Transmission: CVT

Dimensions
- Wheelbase: 104.5 in (2,654 mm)
- Length: 185.8 in (4,719 mm)
- Width: 72.5 in (1,842 mm)
- Height: 63.8 in (1,621 mm)

The Acura ADX is a subcompact luxury crossover SUV marketed by Acura, the luxury brand of Japanese manufacturer Honda. It is engineered on the same advanced global architecture as the Acura Integra, eleventh generation Civic, sixth generation CR-V, and Honda ZR-V/HR-V.

== Overview ==
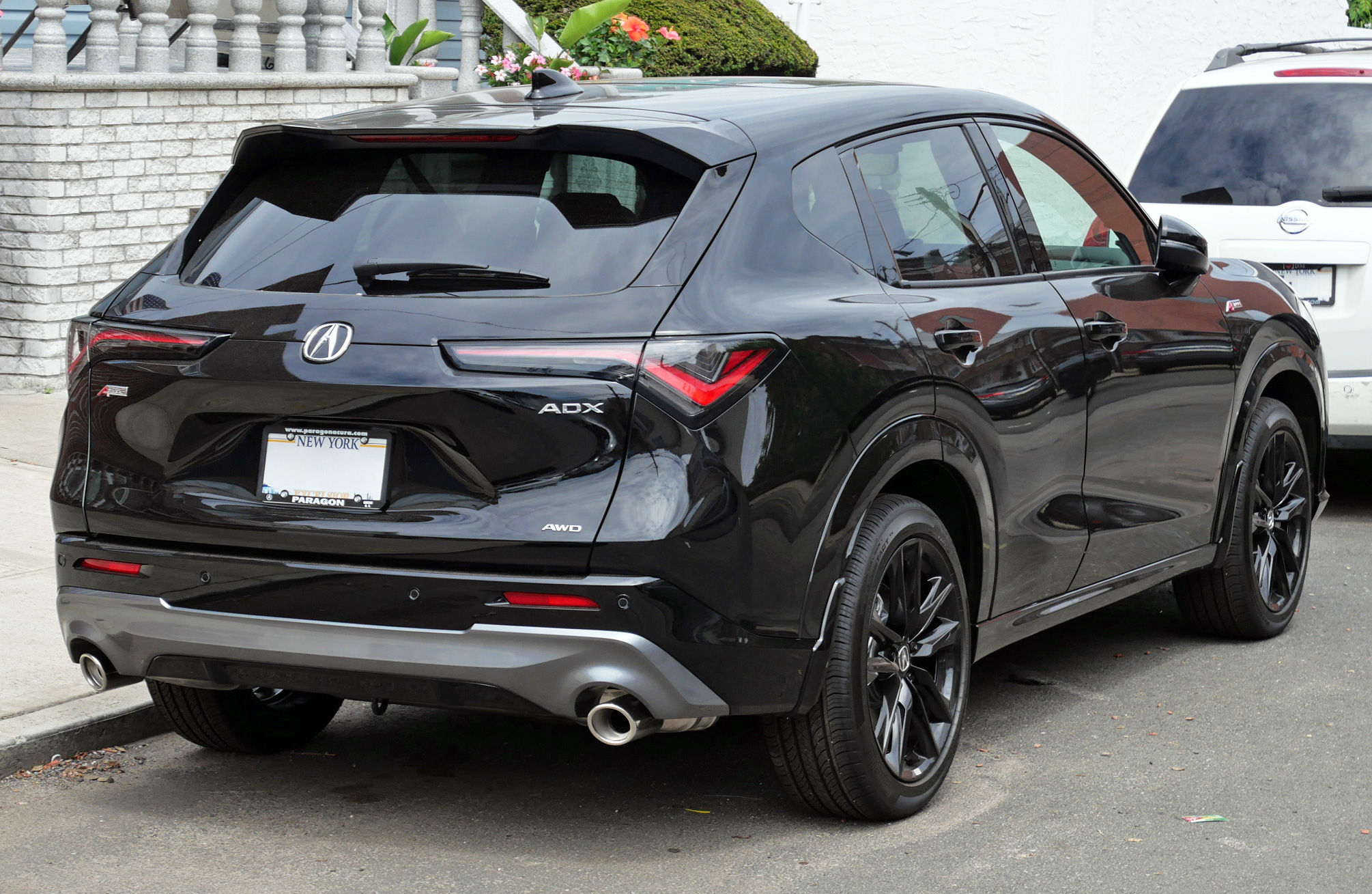
Rear view

The ADX was unveiled on 14 November 2024 and was released in early 2025 for the 2025 model year.

Its standard powertrain is a variant of the turbocharged 1.5-liter VTEC 4-cylinder engine from the Integra, producing 190 hp (140 kW) at 6,000 rpm and 179 lb⋅ft (243 N⋅m) of torque between 1,700 and 5,000 rpm, with an optional all-wheel drive system which can send more than 50% of torque to the rear wheels. A CVT is standard on all models.

The ADX is the first Acura model assembled outside the United States, Japan, and Canada; unlike other American-built Acura models, the ADX is produced in Mexico at the Honda plant in Celaya, Guanajuato, along with the Honda HR-V for the North American market.
