= Honda ZR-V =

Compact crossover SUV

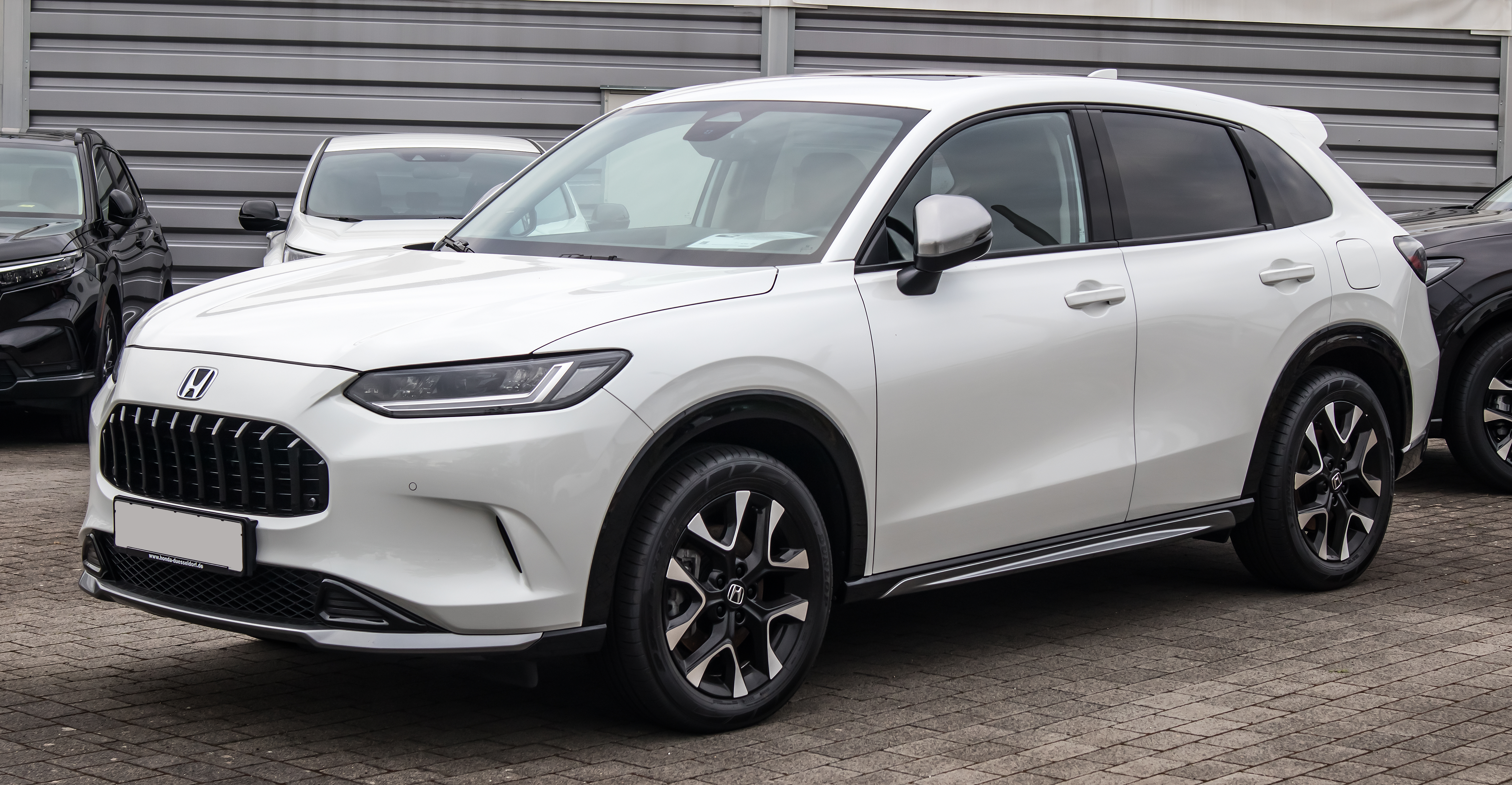
- Honda ZR-V e:HEV Advance (Europe)

Overview
- Manufacturer: Honda
- Model code: RZ
- Also called: Honda HR-V (North America and China)
- Production: June 2022 – present
- Model years: 2023–present
- Assembly: Japan: Yorii, Saitama; Mexico: Celaya; China: Guangzhou (GAC Honda, ZR-V, 2022–2026); Wuhan (Dongfeng Honda, HR-V)
- Designer: Hirotoshi Tamura (exterior); Daiki Ueno (interior)

Body and chassis
- Class: Compact crossover SUV (C)
- Body style: 5-door SUV
- Layout: Front-engine, front-wheel-drive (RZ1/3/4); Front-engine, four-wheel-drive (RZ2/5/6)
- Platform: Honda Architecture (HA)
- Related: Acura ADX; Honda Civic (eleventh generation); Acura Integra (2023); Honda CR-V (sixth generation)

Powertrain
- Engine: Petrol: 1.5 L L15C1 turbo I4 (RZ3/5); 2.0 L K20Z5 I4 (RZ1/2); Petrol hybrid: 2.0 L LFC-H4 I4 (RZ4/6)
- Power output: 176 hp (131 kW; 178 PS) (L15C1); 158 hp (118 kW; 160 PS) (K20Z5); 139 hp (104 kW; 141 PS) (LFC); 181 hp (135 kW; 184 PS) (H4 electric motor)
- Transmission: CVT
- Hybrid drivetrain: e:HEV power-split

Dimensions
- Wheelbase: 104.5 in (2,654 mm)
- Length: 179.8 in (4,567 mm)
- Width: 72.4 in (1,839 mm)
- Height: 63.4–63.8 in (1,610–1,621 mm)
- Curb weight: 3,159–3,333 lb (1,433–1,512 kg)

Chronology
- Predecessor: Honda HR-V (second generation) (North America)

The Honda ZR-V (called the Honda HR-V in North America and China) is a compact crossover SUV (C-segment) produced by Honda. Positioned between the global market HR-V/Vezel/XR-V and the CR-V, the vehicle shares its platform with the eleventh-generation Civic.

The development of the ZR-V was led by model development manager Shuichi Ono. It was first unveiled in the United States on 4 April 2022 as the third-generation HR-V differentiated from the global model, in order to "meet the distinct needs of U.S. customers". Sales started in that market on 7 June 2022 for the 2023 model year. Later launches such as in China and Europe utilized the "ZR-V" nameplate as it is sold alongside the global HR-V in these markets. Chinese models are produced by both GAC Honda as the ZR-V and Dongfeng Honda as the HR-V respectively. European models will use full hybrid powertrain as standard. Models sold in Europe are manufactured in China at GAC Honda's Huang Pu Plant.

According to Honda, the name "ZR-V" stands for "Z Runabout Vehicle", a reference to the Generation Z, and unrelated to Honda Z microcars.

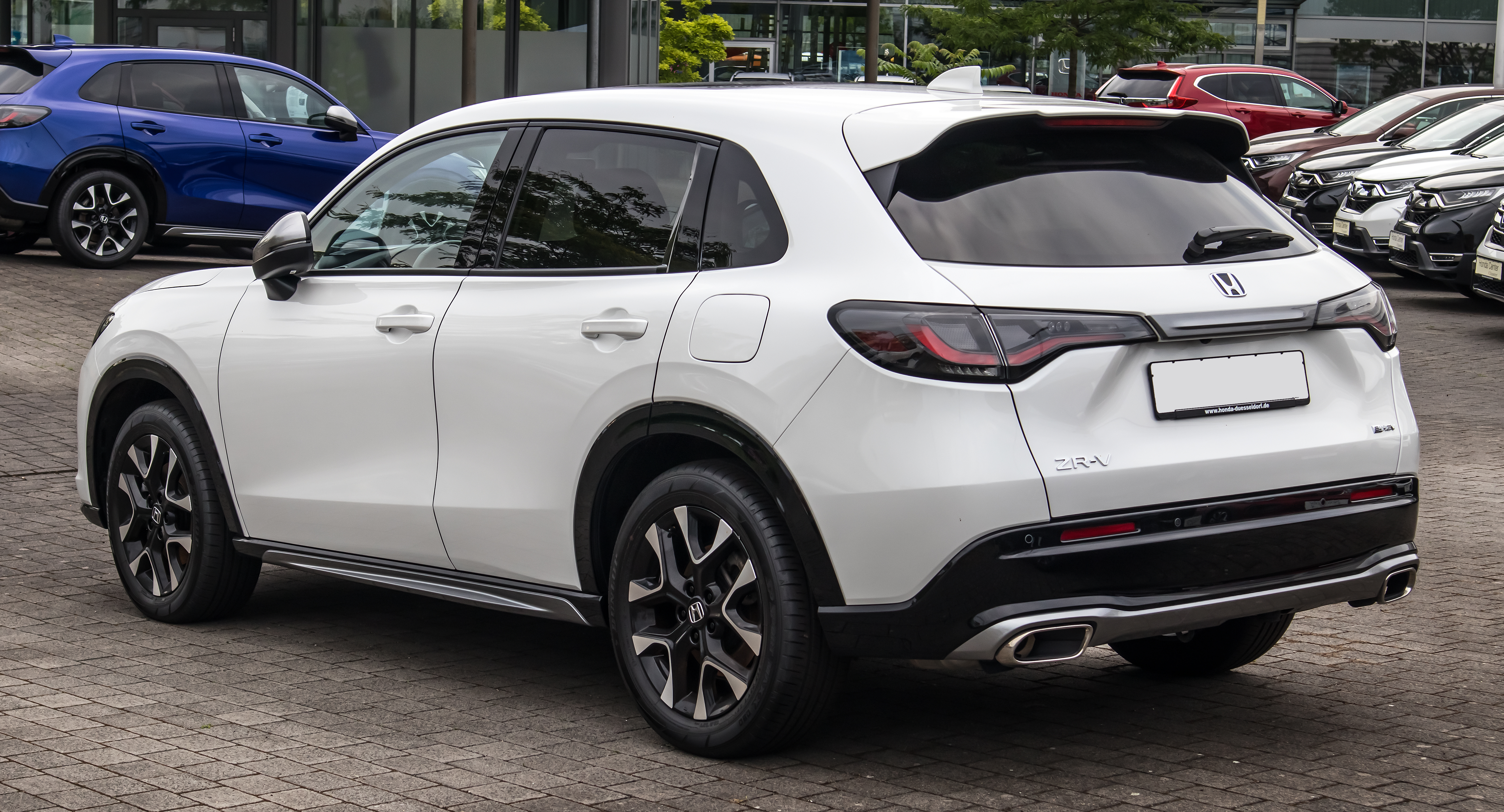
Rear view (ZR-V)

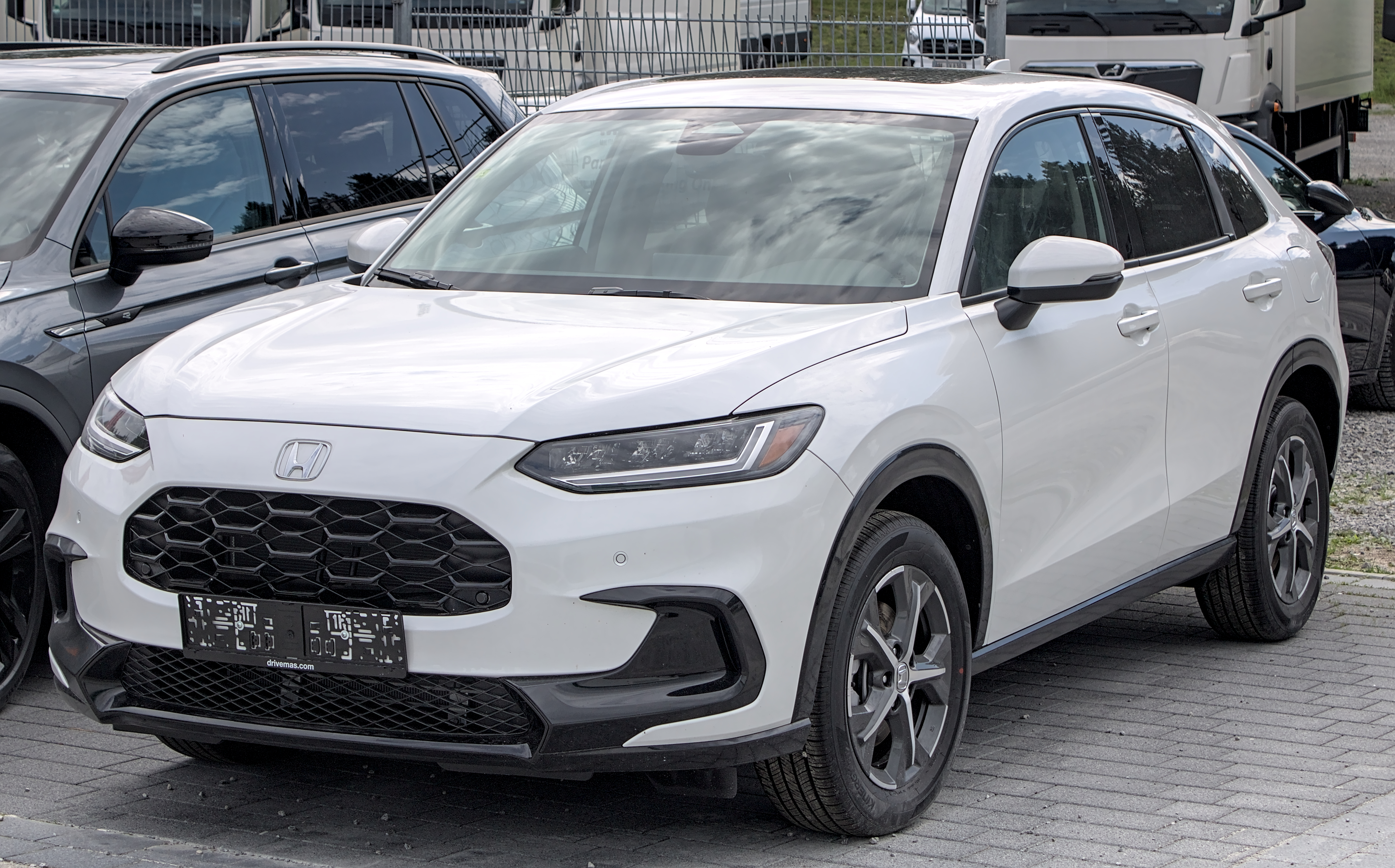
2023 Honda HR-V

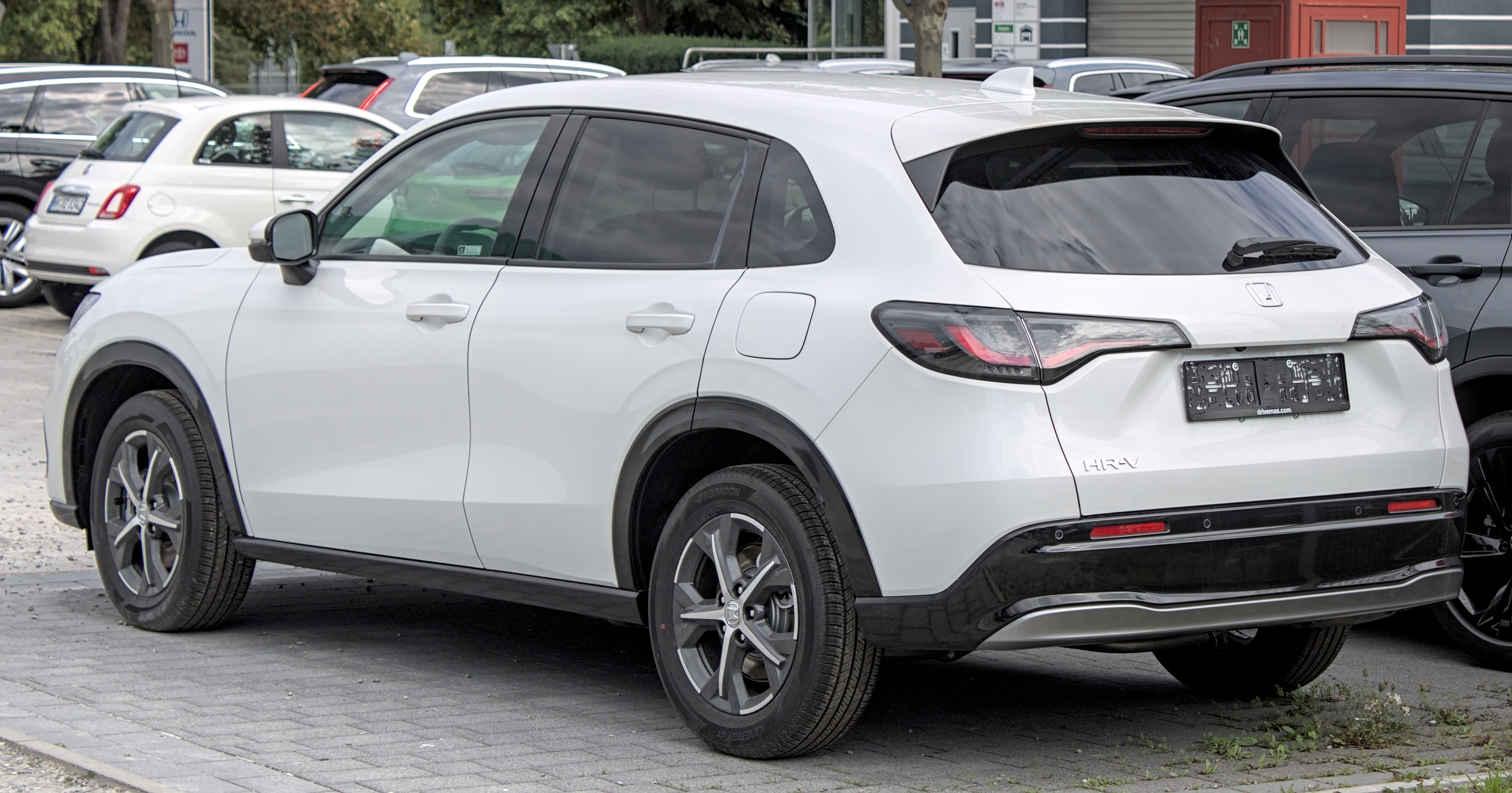
Rear view (HR-V)

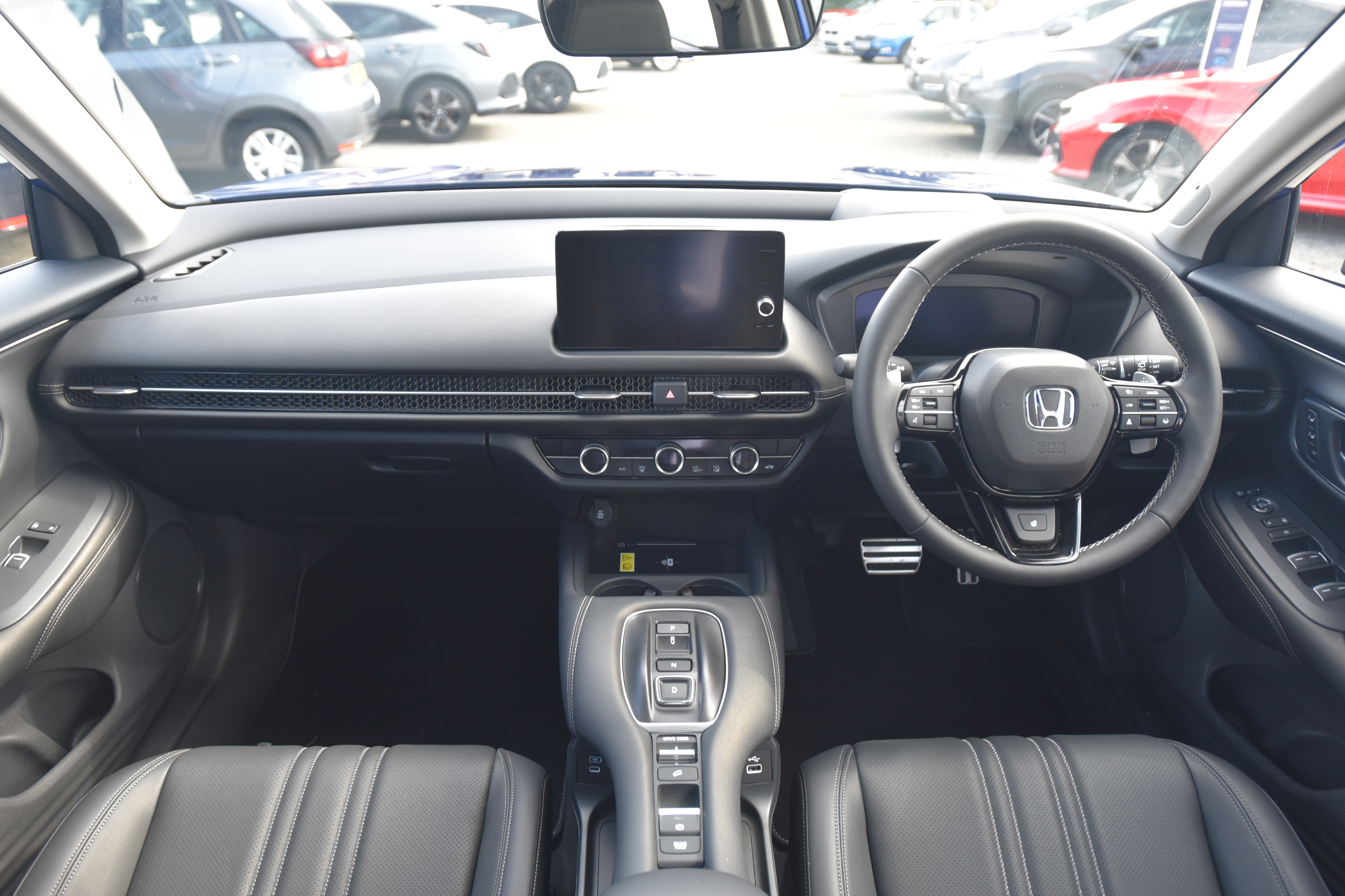
Interior (ZR-V)

== Markets ==
=== Asia ===
==== Brunei ====
The ZR-V was launched in Brunei on 5 September 2026 alongside with the Super-One, in the sole e:HEV variant powered by the 2.0-litre e:HEV petrol hybrid.

==== China ====
The Chinese market ZR-V was unveiled in May 2022. Produced by GAC Honda, the model is powered by a 1.5-litre turbocharged petrol engine. A version produced by Dongfeng Honda was launched in February 2023 as the HR-V.

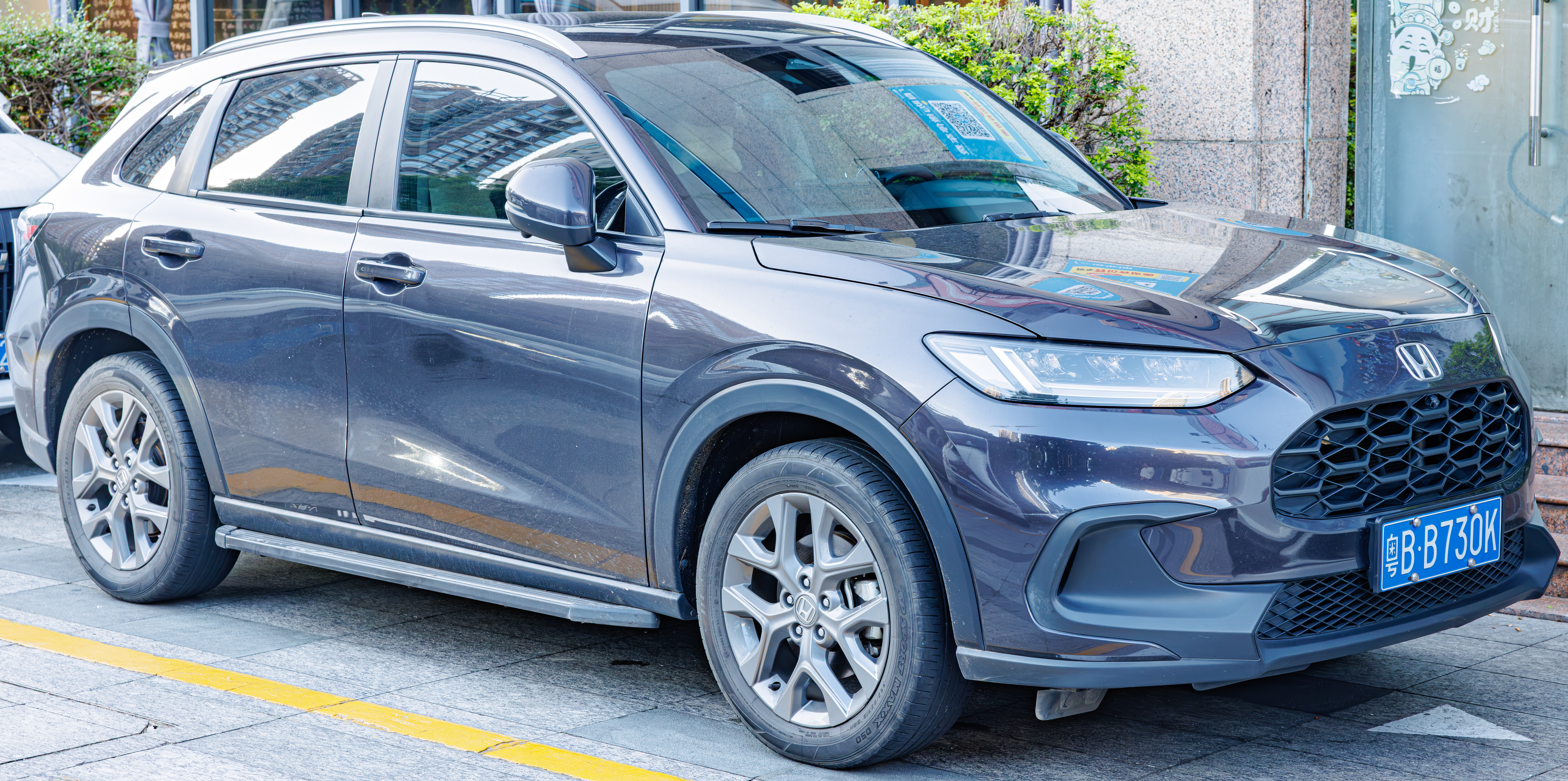
GAC Honda ZR-V

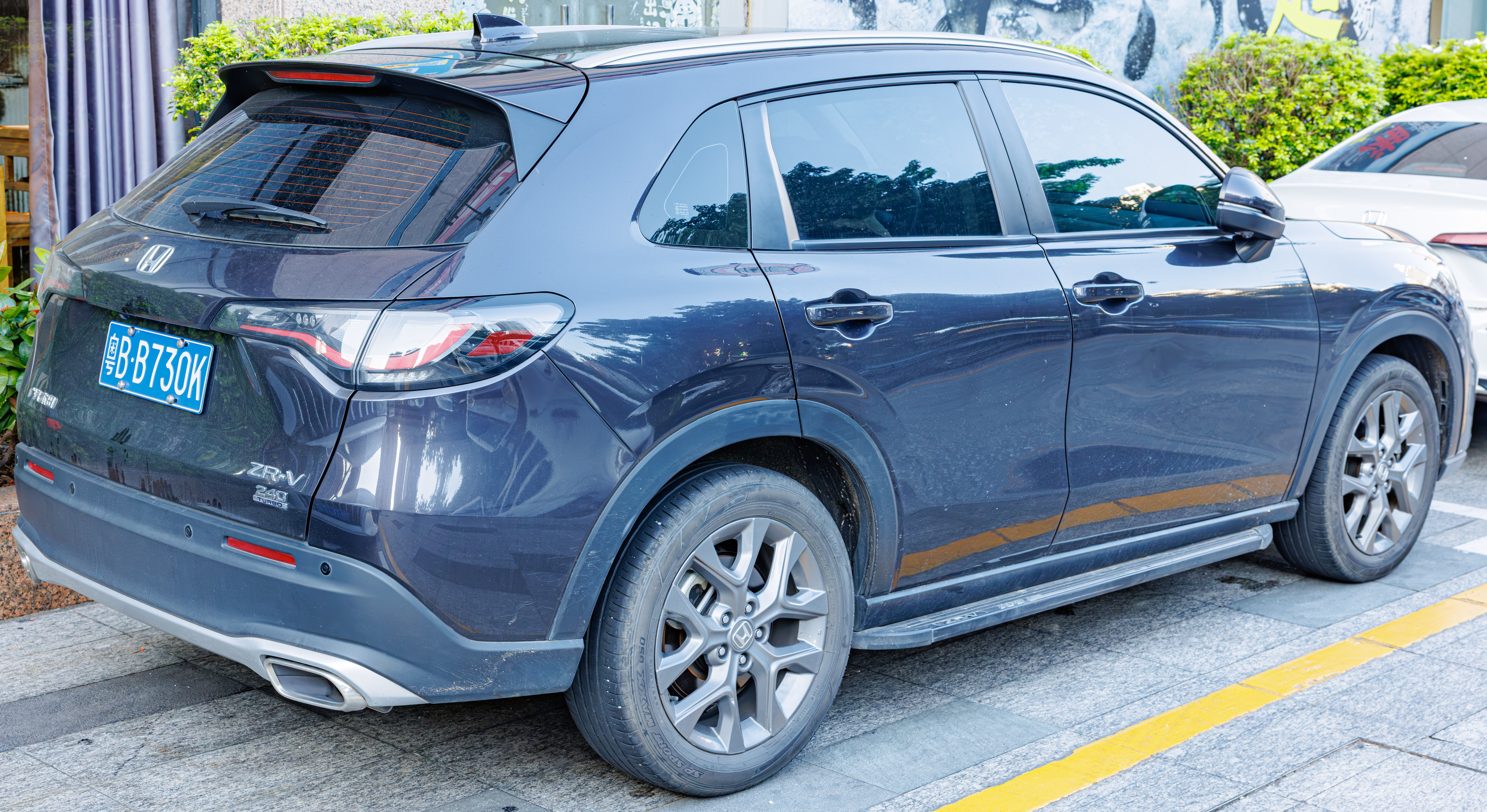
Rear view

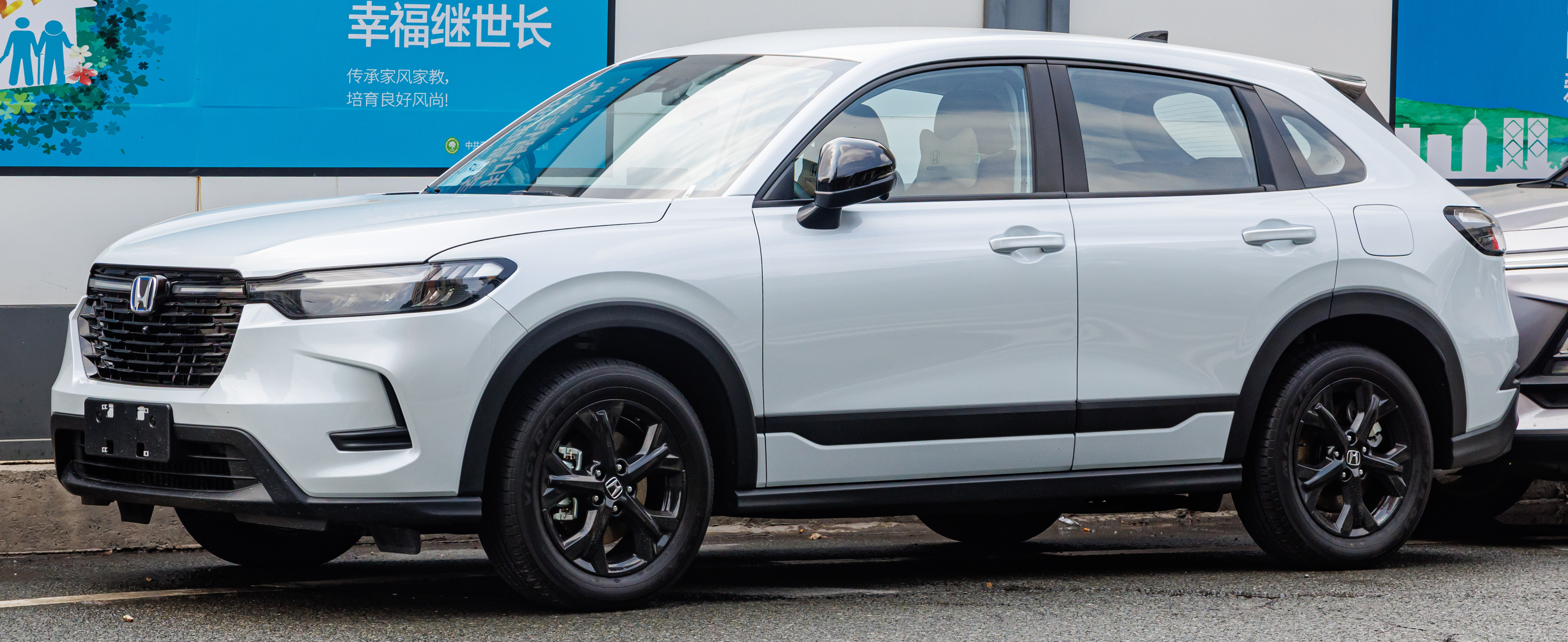
Honda HR-V (China)

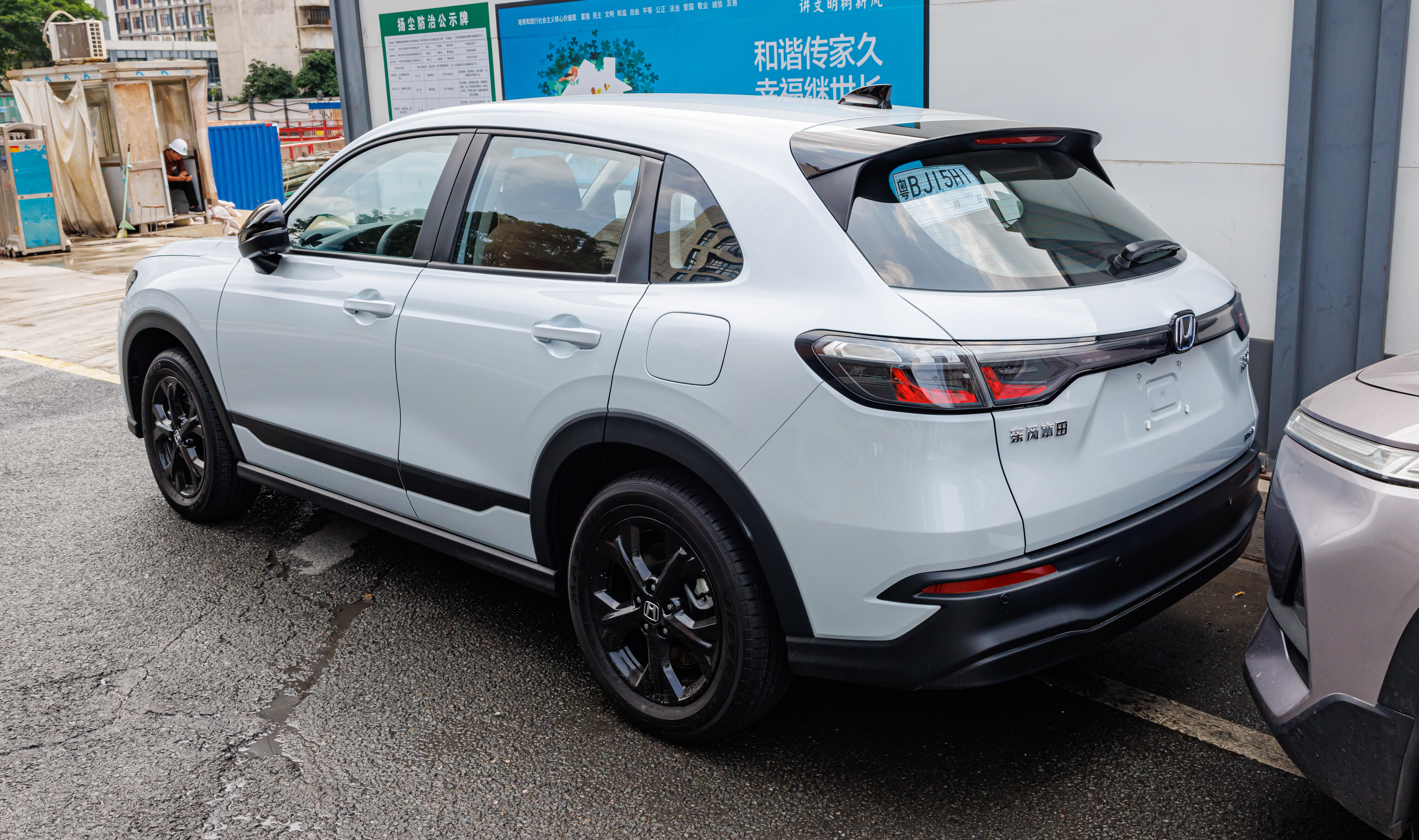
Rear view

==== Hong Kong ====
The ZR-V was launched in Hong Kong on 27 April 2023, with only the 2.0-litre e:HEV petrol hybrid is available.

==== India ====
The ZR-V e:HEV was introduced in India on 22 May 2026, alongside the second-facelifted City. It is offered in a sole e:HEV hybrid variant with the 2.0-litre e:HEV petrol-hybrid powertrain fully imported from Japan. The ZR-V was launched on 25 July 2026. Deliveries commenced shortly after its launch, with Honda confirmed that the first two CBU batches allocated for the Indian market had been sold out.

==== Japan ====
The Japanese market ZR-V was announced in July 2022, with Japanese sales commenced on 8 September 2022, which temporarily replaced the CR-V. Two trim levels are available: X and Z, and it is powered by either a 1.5-litre turbocharged petrol engine or a 2.0-litre e:HEV petrol hybrid powertrains available for both trim levels. Front-wheel drive and all-wheel drive are optional for all models.

The Black Style trim, based on the e:HEV Z grade, was added in June 2024.

In February 2026, the Black Style trim received several improvements. The front grille has been changed from a vertical design to a honeycomb pattern, and the 18-inch aluminum alloy wheels received a dark machined clear coat finish.

In March 2026, the 1.5-litre turbocharged petrol engine was discontinued, therefore the ZR-V line-up became hybrid-only in Japan. In the same year, the Cross Touring was added.

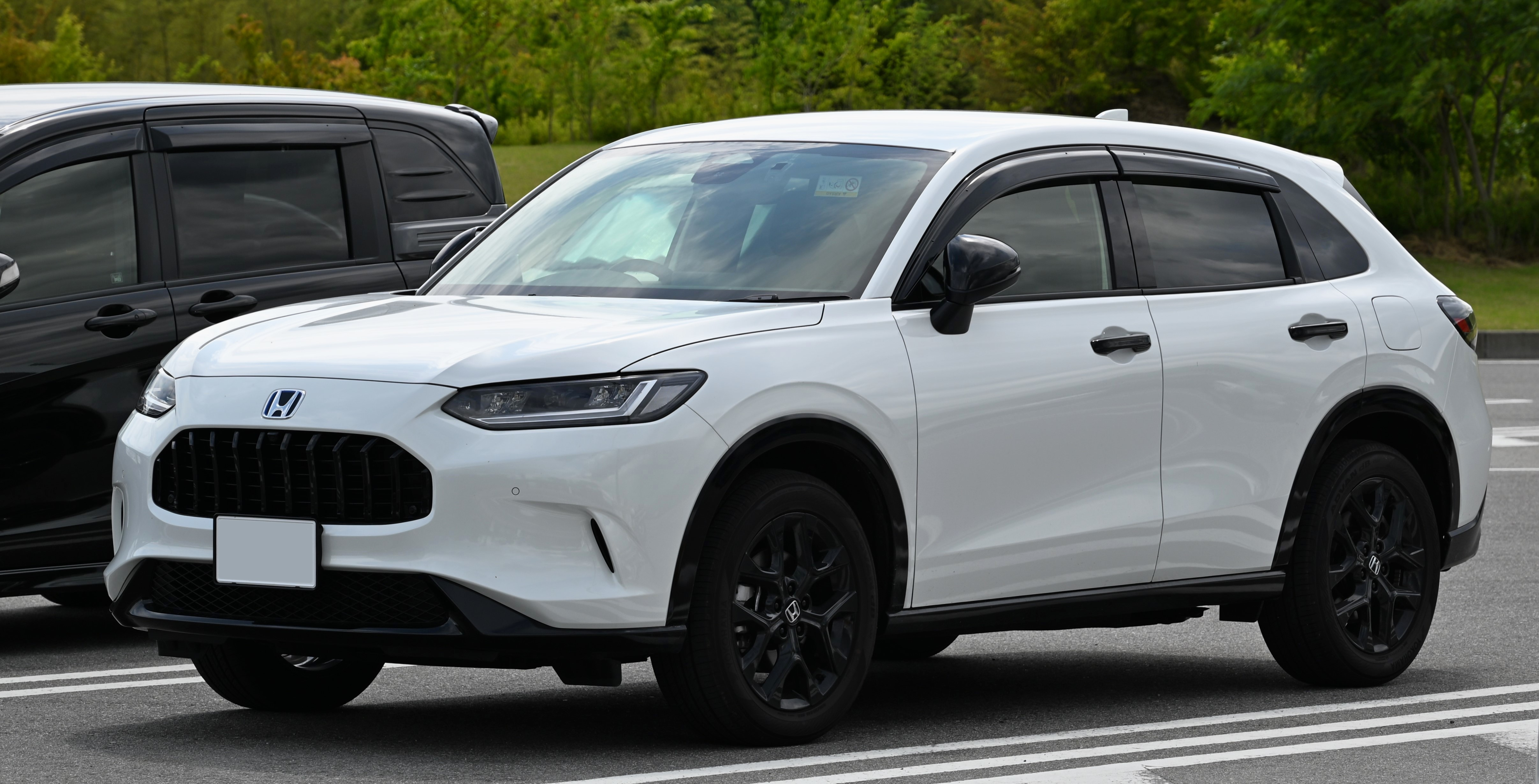
2024 Honda ZR-V e:HEV Z Black Style (Japan)

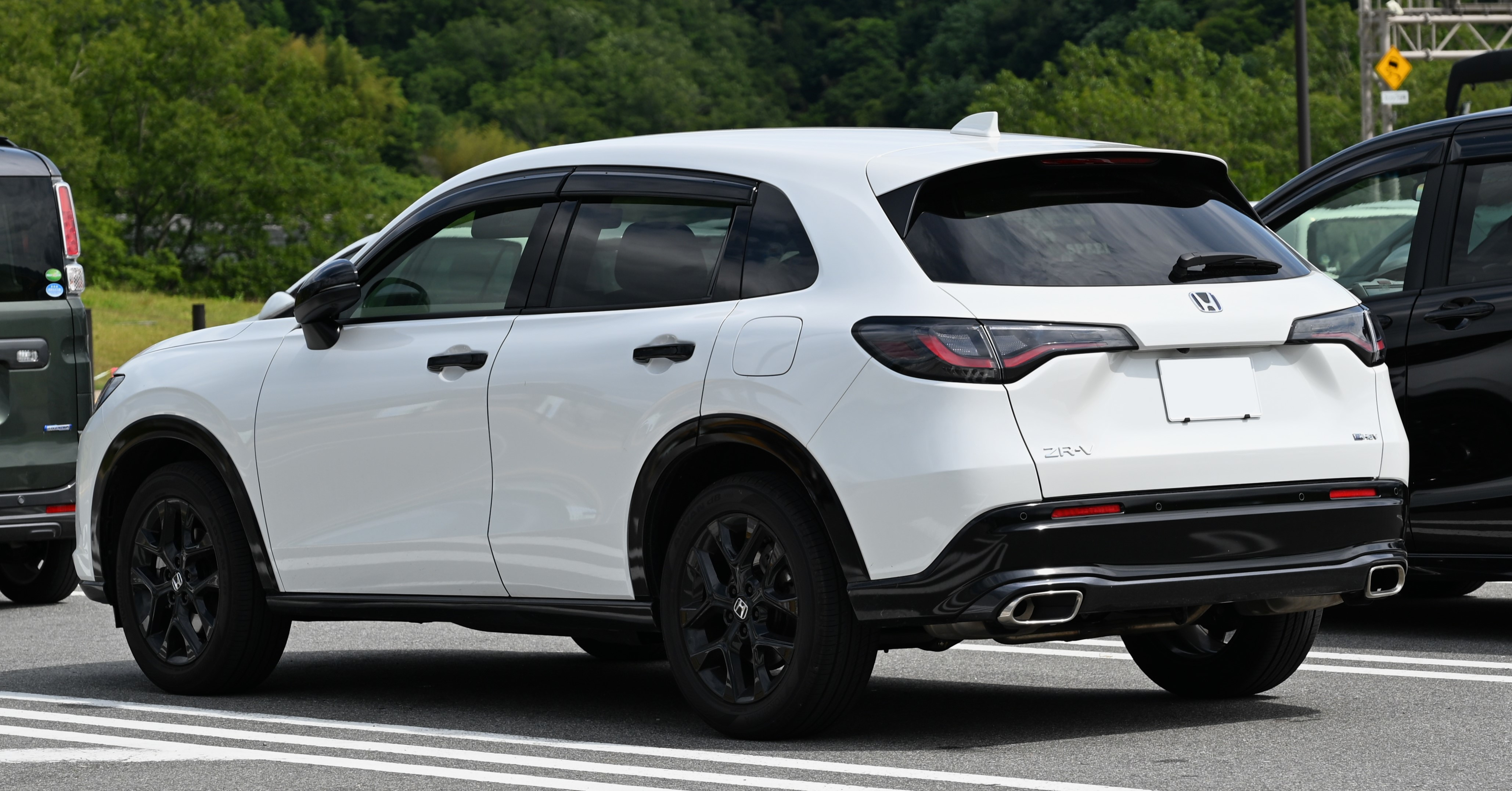
2024 Honda ZR-V e:HEV Z Black Style (rear view)

==== Singapore ====
The ZR-V was launched in Singapore on 26 January 2026, in the sole e:HEV variant powered by the 2.0-litre e:HEV petrol hybrid.

=== Egypt ===
The ZR-V was announced in Egypt on 24 June 2024, and went on sale on 8 July 2024. It features one trim, the EX, with a 1.5-litre turbocharged petrol produces 180 hp (134 kW; 182 PS) and 177 lb⋅ft (240 N⋅m) of torque. The trim comes with Honda Sensing as standard.

=== Middle East ===
The GCC markets ZR-V was unveiled on 28 March 2023, and went on sale on 2 June 2023. The trim levels offered are LX and EX, it is powered by a 1.5-litre turbocharged petrol.

=== Latin America ===
==== Argentina ====
The ZR-V was launched in Argentina on 28 September 2023, with two trim levels: LX and Touring, it is powered by the 2.0-litre petrol engine.

==== Brazil ====
The ZR-V was launched in Brazil on 30 October 2023, in the sole unnamed variant powered by the 2.0-litre petrol engine.

==== Mexico ====
The ZR-V went on sale in Mexico on 14 June 2022, with three trim levels: Uniq, Sport and Touring, it is powered by the 2.0-litre petrol engine.

=== North America ===
The model went on sale in North America as the HR-V on 7 June 2022 for the 2023 model year. It is powered by a 2.0-litre petrol engine producing 158 hp (118 kW; 160 PS) at 6,500 rpm and 138 lb⋅ft (187 N⋅m; 19.1 kg⋅m) of torque at 4,200 rpm with an optional all-wheel drive system. Trim levels offered are: LX, Sport, and EX-L. North American models are produced in Celaya, Mexico.

In May 2025, for the 2026 model year, the HR-V line-up was updated with changes such as refreshed exterior and interior styling, a 9-inch touchscreen with wireless Android Auto and Apple CarPlay became standard across the line-up and standard wireless charging.

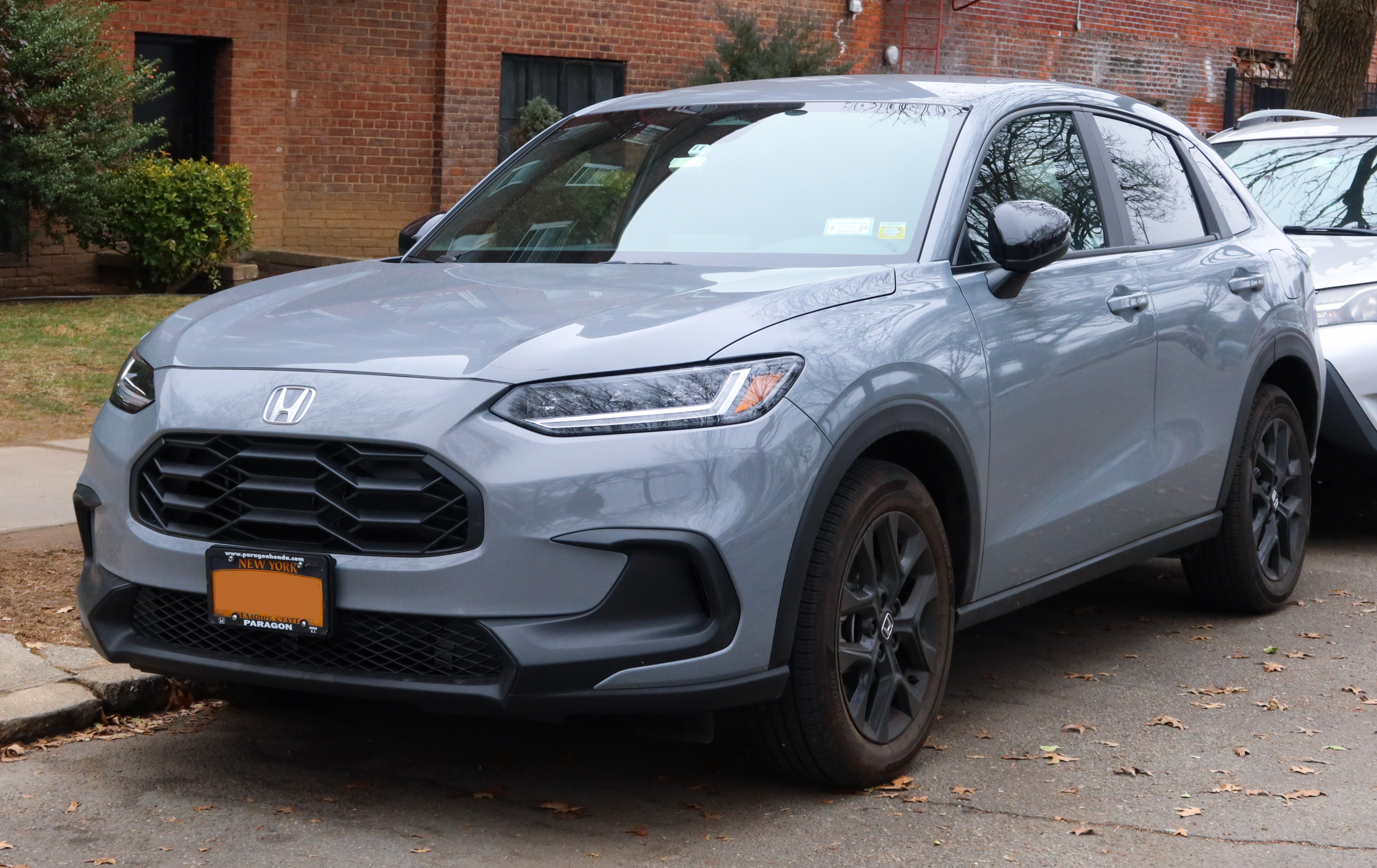
Honda HR-V Sport (North America)

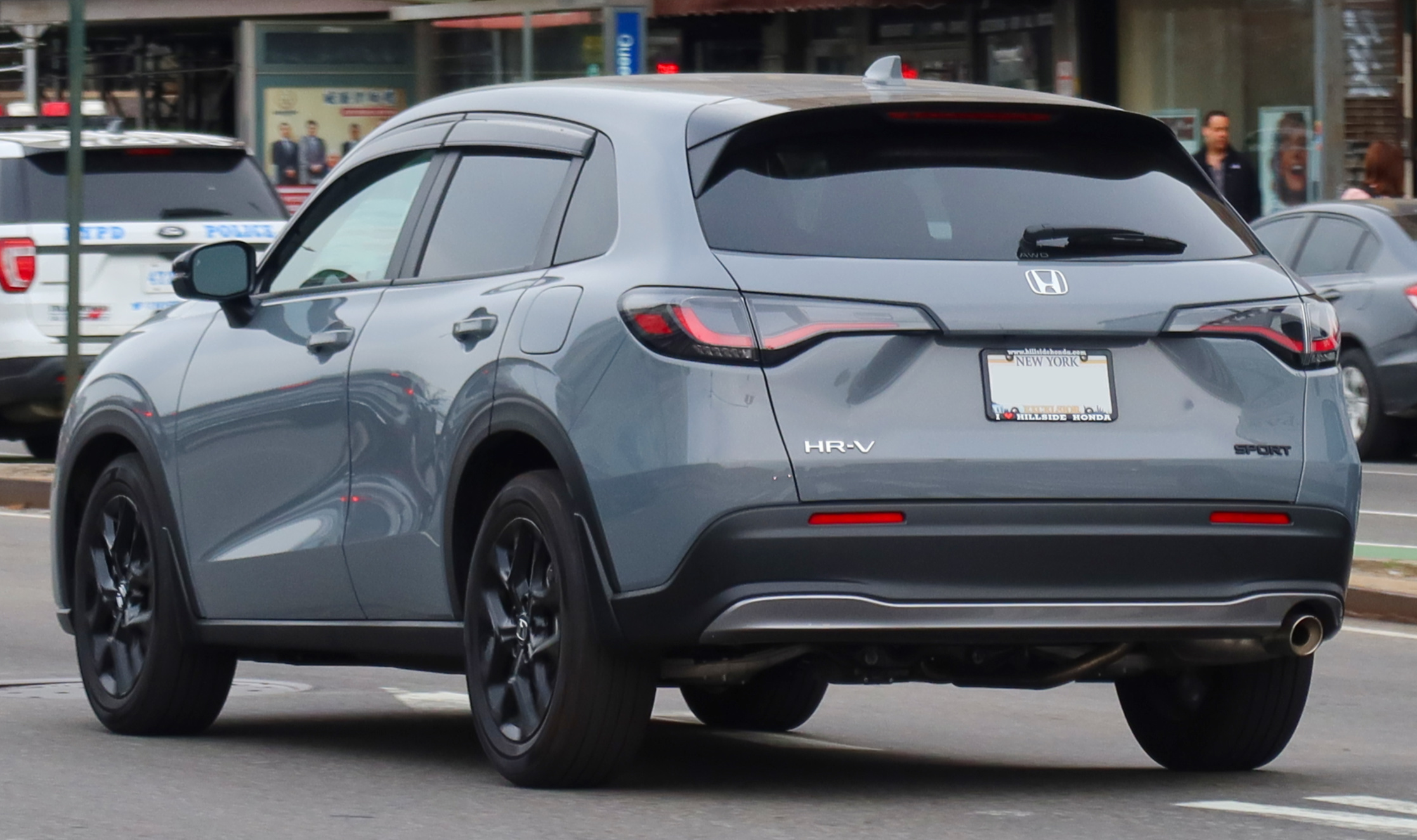
Rear view

=== Oceania ===
==== Australia ====
The ZR-V was launched in Australia on 22 May 2023, It is available in three trim levels: X, L, and LX, it is powered by a 1.5-litre turbocharged petrol or a 2.0-litre e:HEV petrol hybrid powertrains, the latter powertrain option exclusive for the range topping LX trim.

In May 2026, the ZR-V line-up was updated in Australia with the e:HEV petrol hybrid was made available for the X and L trims. In addition, the 1.5-litre turbocharged petrol were discontinued for all trims except for the X trim.

==== New Zealand ====
The ZR-V went on sale in New Zealand in May 2023, with two variants available: Turbo and Sport, it is powered by a 1.5-litre turbocharged petrol or a 2.0-litre e:HEV petrol hybrid powertrains, with the latter powertrain standard for the latter variant.

=== United Kingdom ===
The ZR-V was launched in the UK on the 4 July 2023, three trim levels are available: Elegance, Sport and Advance, powered solely by the 2.0-litre e:HEV petrol hybrid. Models sold in Europe are manufactured in China at GAC Honda's Huangpu Plant in the Guangzhou district.

== Safety ==
In the United States, the 2023 HR-V was awarded the "Top Safety Pick +" by the Insurance Institute for Highway Safety.

IIHS scores
Small overlap front (driver)	Good
Small overlap front (passenger)	Good
Moderate overlap front (original test)	Good
Moderate overlap front (updated test)	Good
Side (original test)	Good
Side (updated test)	Good
Headlights	Acceptable
Front crash prevention: vehicle-to-vehicle	Superior
Front crash prevention: vehicle-to-pedestrian (Day)	Superior
Front crash prevention: vehicle-to-pedestrian (Night)	Superior
Seat belt reminders	Good
Child seat anchors (LATCH) ease of use	Acceptable

Euro NCAP test results Honda ZR-V e:HEV Advance (LHD) (2023)
Test	Points	%
Overall:	4 /5 stars	
Adult occupant:	31.9	79%
Child occupant:	42.2	86%
Pedestrian:	51.1	81%
Safety assist:	12.4	68%

ANCAP test results Honda ZR-V (2023, aligned with Euro NCAP)
Test	Points	%
Overall:	4 /5 stars	
Adult occupant:	31.92	79%
Child occupant:	43.25	88%
Pedestrian:	51.12	81%
Safety assist:	12.41	68%

== Sales ==
Year	U.S.	Canada	Mexico	Brazil	Japan	China	
Year	HR-V			ZR-V			HR-V
2022	115,416	11,031			2,892	3,037	—
2023	122,206	11,896	9,061	699	21,168	13,212	30,747
2024	151,468			5,920	41,513	7,026	26,600
2025						110	7,717
