= Honda N-One =

Retro-styled kei car produced by Honda

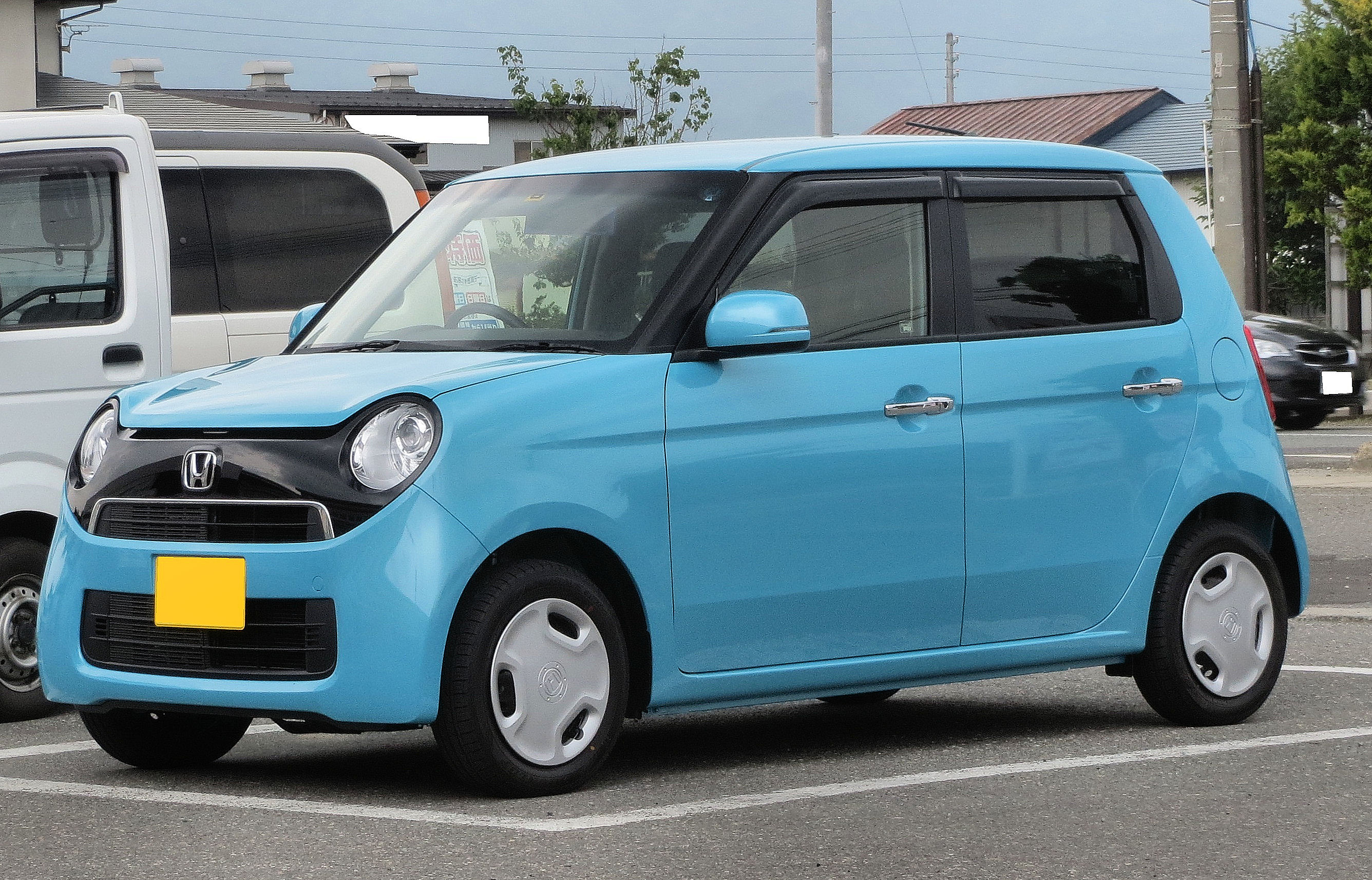

Overview
- Manufacturer: Honda
- Production: November 2012 – present
- Assembly: Japan: Suzuka, Mie (Suzuka plant)

Body and chassis
- Class: Kei car (Japan); City car (A-segment; international)
- Body style: 5-door hatchback
- Related: Honda N-WGN; Honda N-Box; Honda S660

Chronology
- Predecessor: Honda Life; Honda Zest

The Honda N-One (Japanese: ホンダ・N-ONE, Hepburn: Honda Enuwan) (corporately styled as N-ONE) is a kei car produced by Honda since 2012 over two generations. It is a five-door hatchback with retro styling and either front-wheel drive or all-wheel drive.

The "N" prefix was previously used for the late 1960s and 1970s N360; originally it stood for norimono which loosely translates to vehicle. For the new N lineup, the "N" represents New, Next, Nippon, and Norimono.

The N-One was released in November 2012 as the third model in the "N" Series of kei cars, which began with the N-Box launched in December 2011. It is the successor to the Zest.

== First generation (JG1/2; 2012) ==
First generation
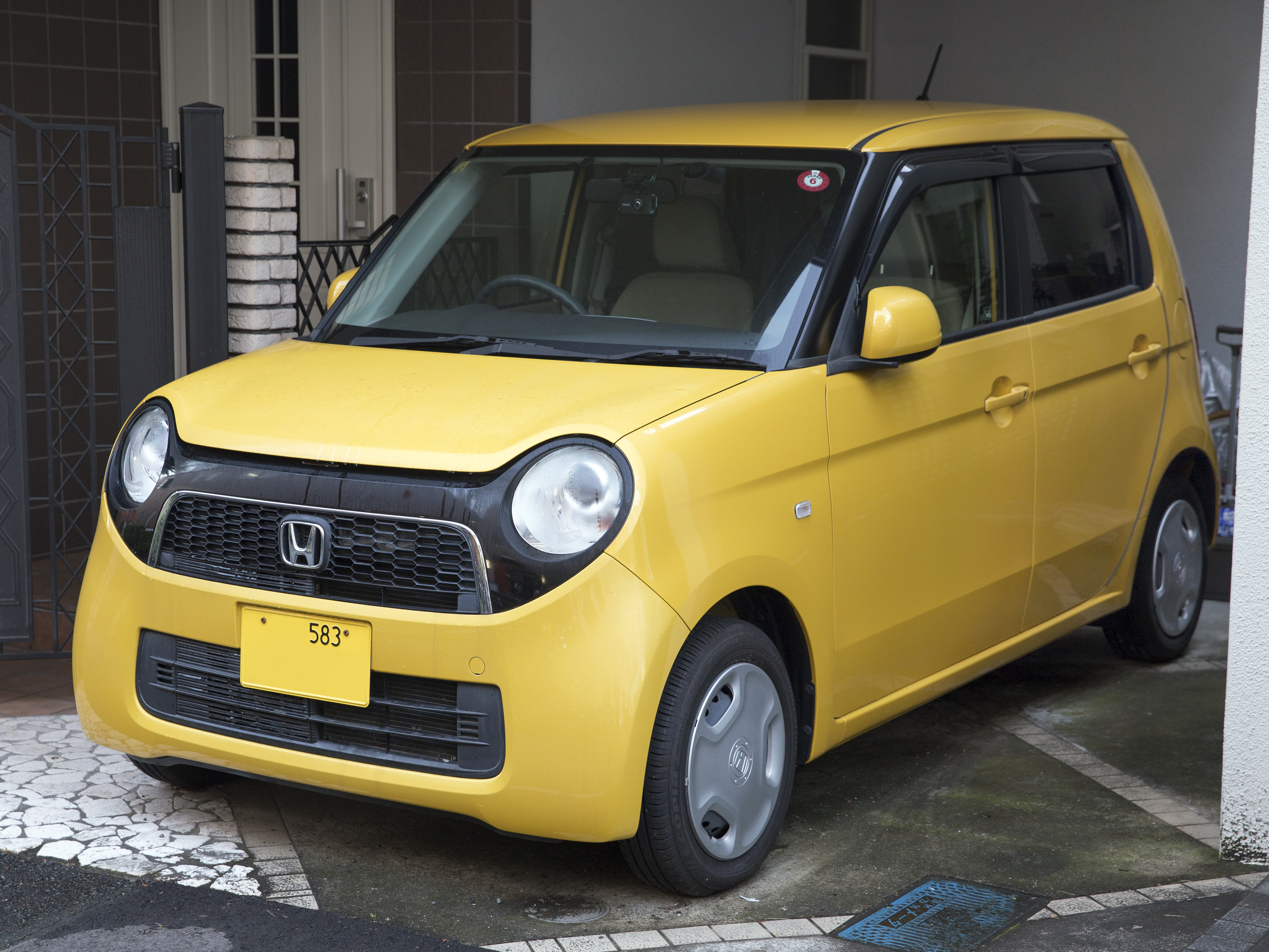

Overview
- Model code: JG1/2
- Production: November 2012 – March 2020

Body and chassis
- Layout: Front-engine, front-wheel-drive (JG1); Front-engine, four-wheel-drive (JG2)

Powertrain
- Engine: Petrol: 658 cc S07A I3; 658 cc S07A turbo I3
- Power output: 43 kW (58 PS) (S07A); 47 kW (64 PS) (S07A turbo)
- Transmission: CVT

Dimensions
- Wheelbase: 2,520 mm (99.2 in)
- Length: 3,395 mm (133.7 in)
- Width: 1,475 mm (58.1 in)
- Height: 1,535–1,630 mm (60.4–64.2 in)
- Kerb weight: 830–920 kg (1,830–2,028 lb)

The first generation N-One was previewed at the 2011 Tokyo Motor Show as the N Concept 4. Together with the N-Box, N-WGN and N-Van, is part of the renewed N lineup of kei class city cars from Honda.

The N-One went on sale on 1 November 2012. It features styling reminiscent of the 1969–1972 N360 and incorporates Honda's DOHC three-cylinder engine with a continuously variable transmission, which was launched in 2011 with the N-Box. It is marketed as an upmarket vehicle in the kei class and incorporates standard features uncommon for its class.

The N-One received a minor facelift in July 2015. All models now feature chrome trim on the front grille and front bumper, and the "Premium" and "Premium Tourer" models also have door sash trim. Furthermore, the roof shape has been changed, a new spoiler design has been adopted, and the "Lowdown" variant was added, featuring a lower suspension, which lowers the overall height by 65 mm (2.6 in), to 1,545 mm (60.8 in), lower than the regular.

The sportier RS variant was added in December 2017. With the addition of the RS and Select variants and the change in grade names, the N-One variants include: Standard, Menu, Premium, and RS.

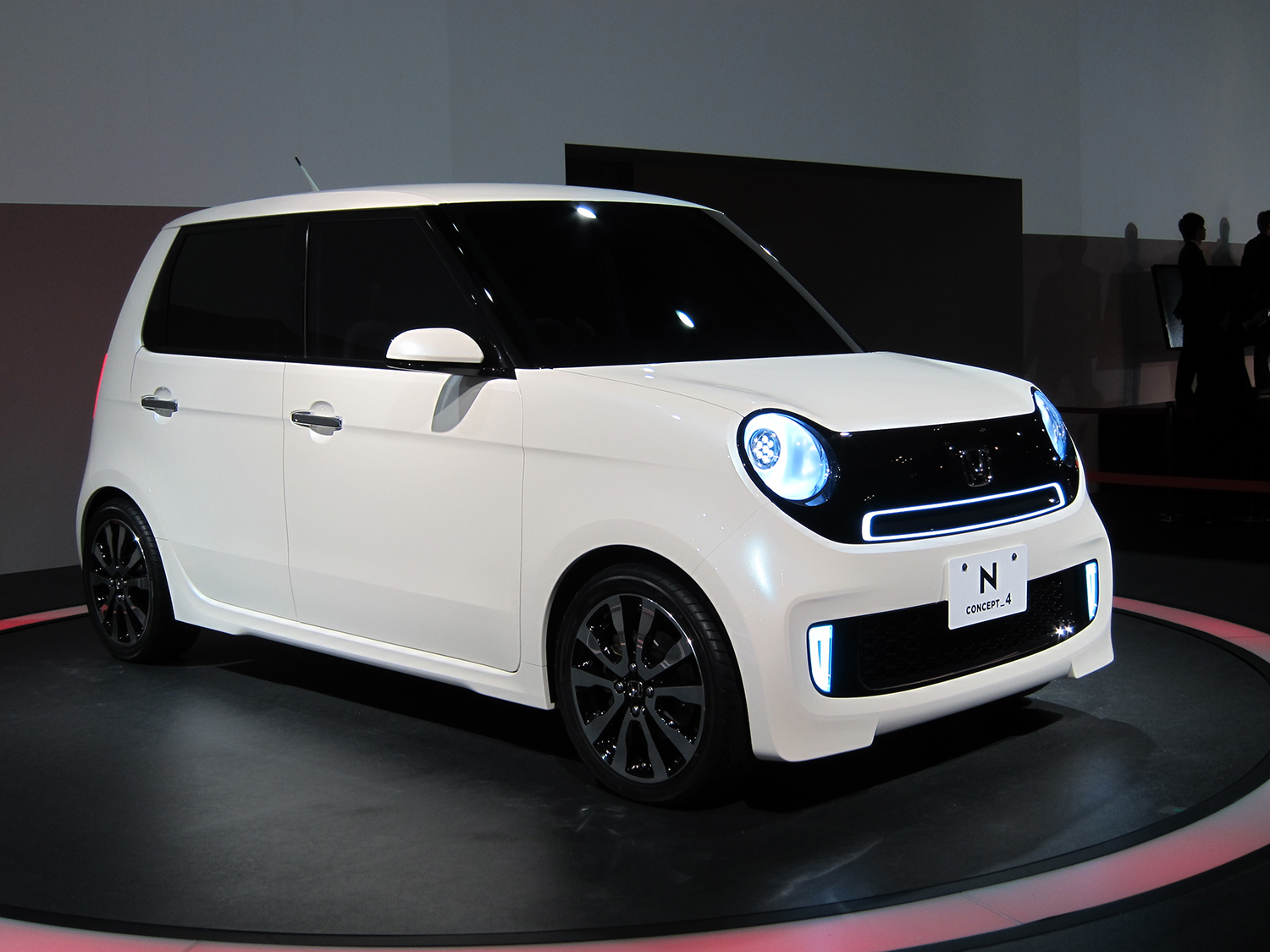
Honda N Concept 4

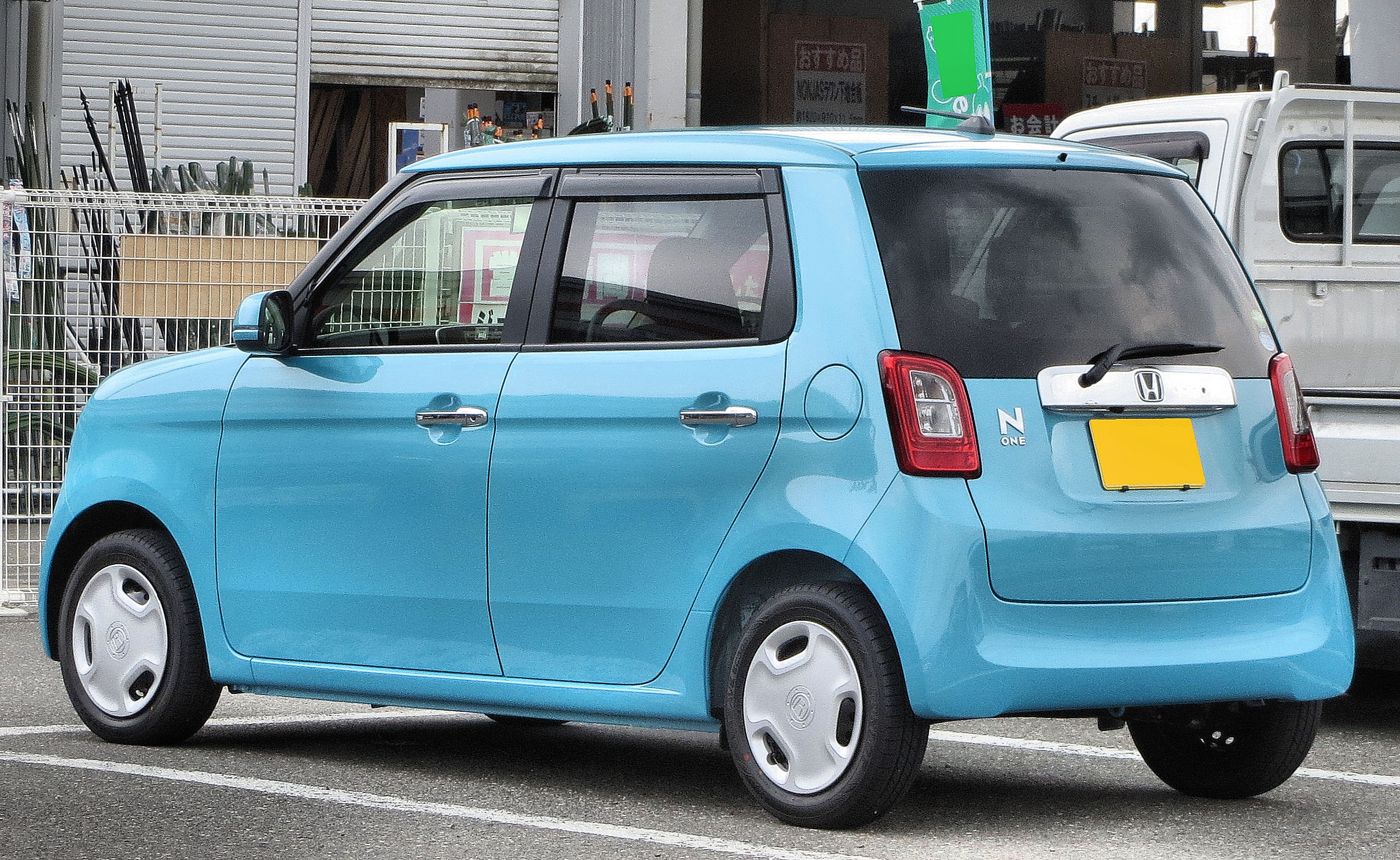
Rear view

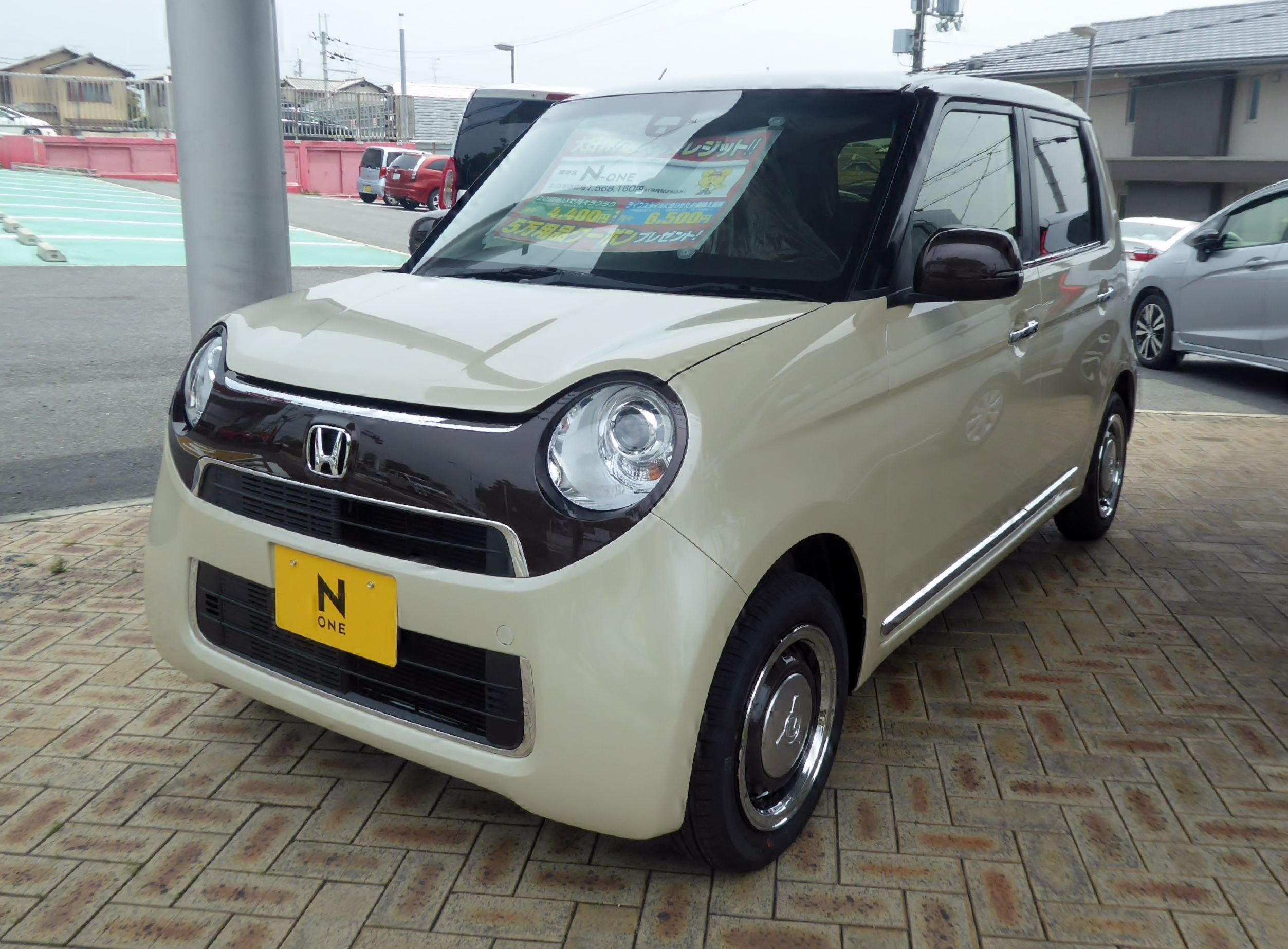
N-One Select (JG1)

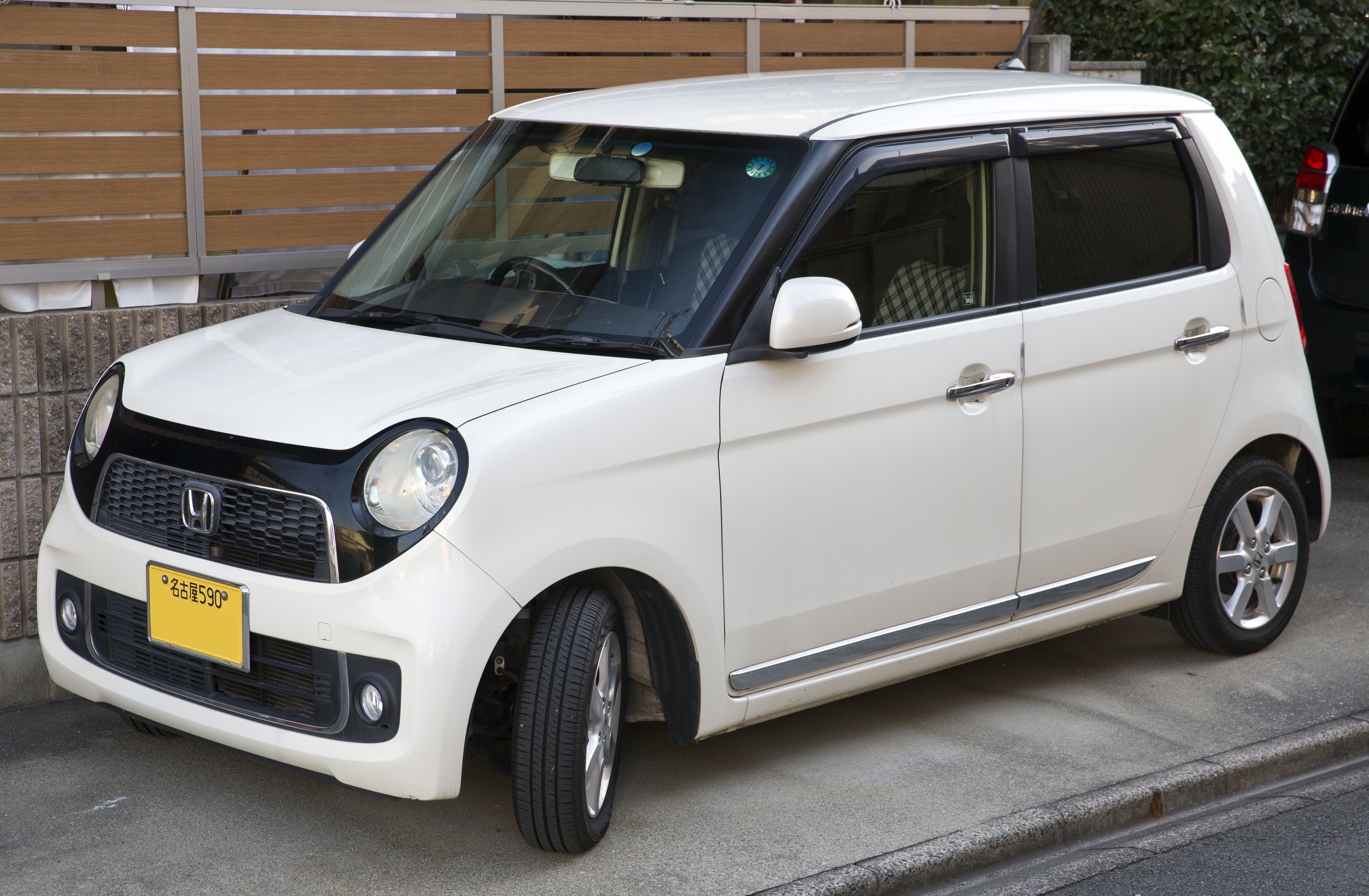
N-One Premium (JG1)

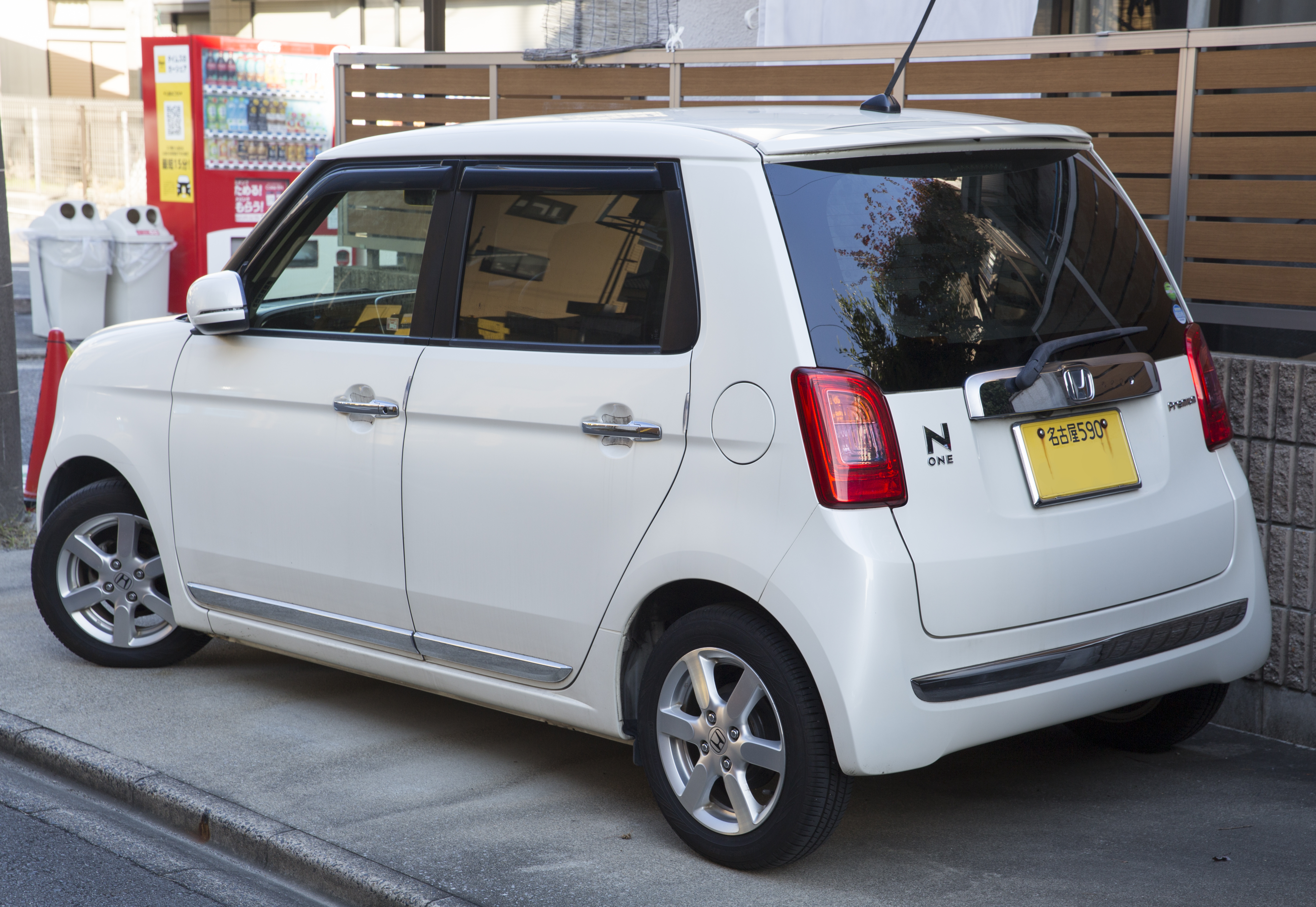
N-One Premium (JG1)

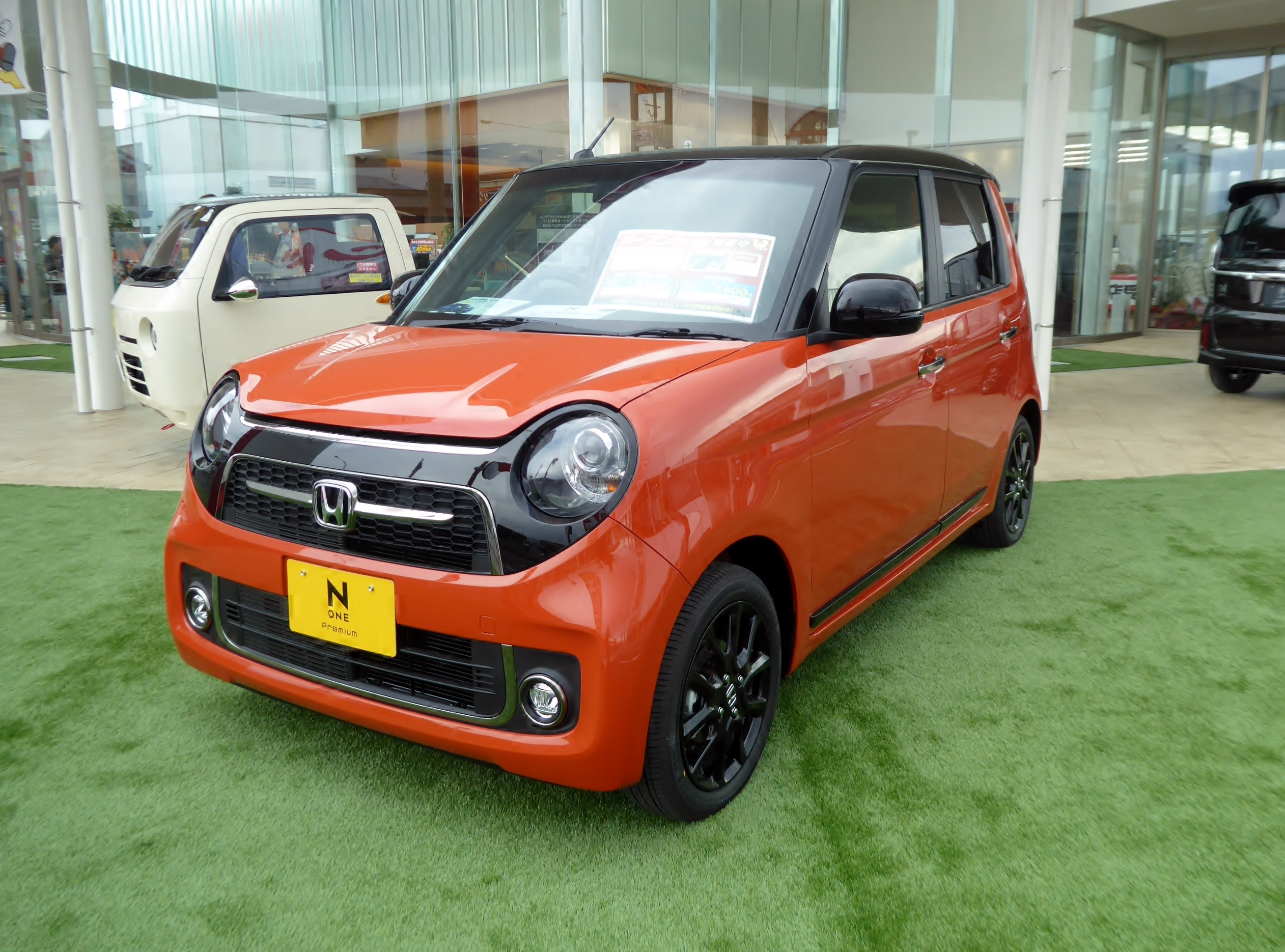
N-One RS (JG1)

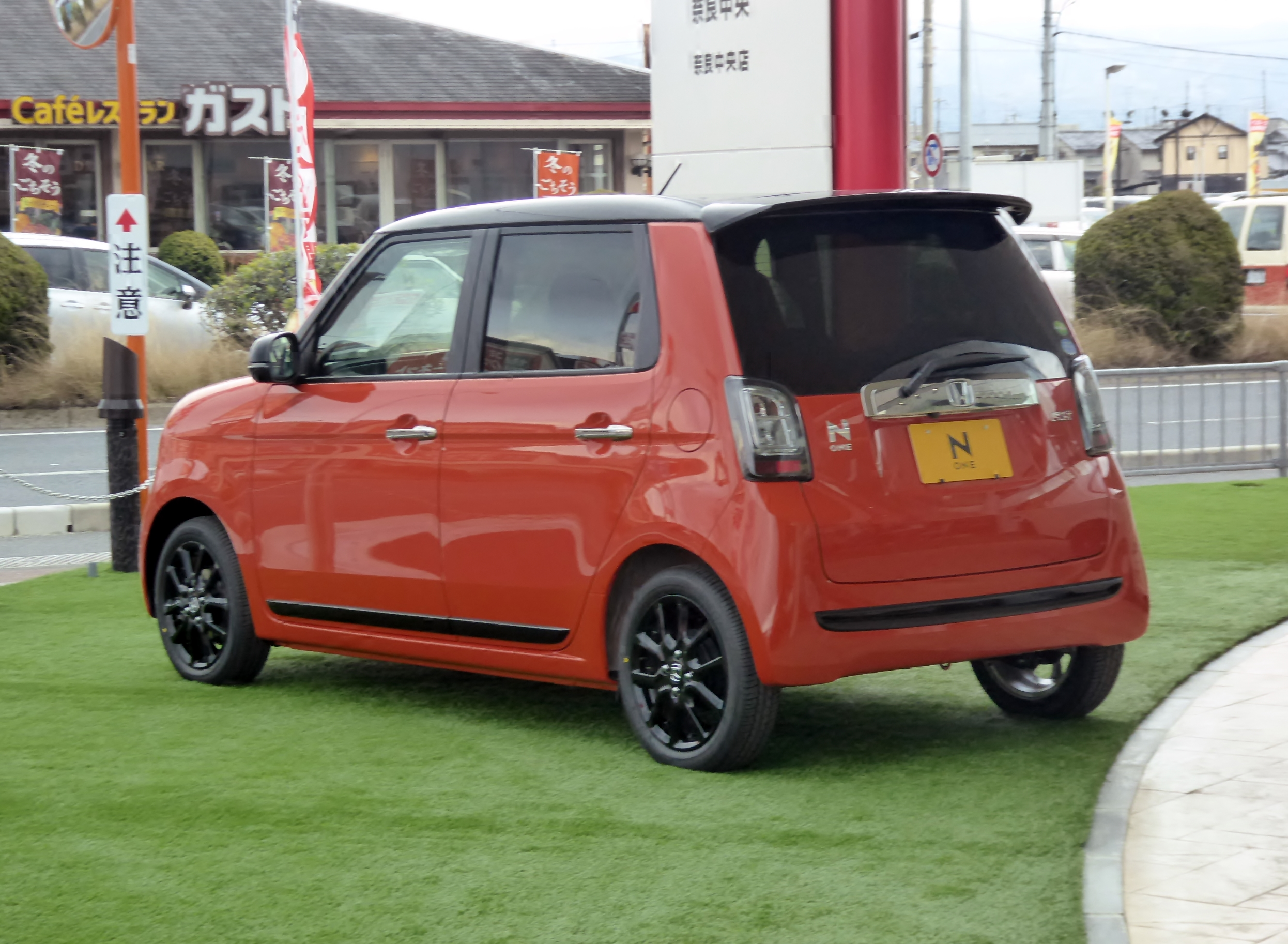
N-One RS (JG1)

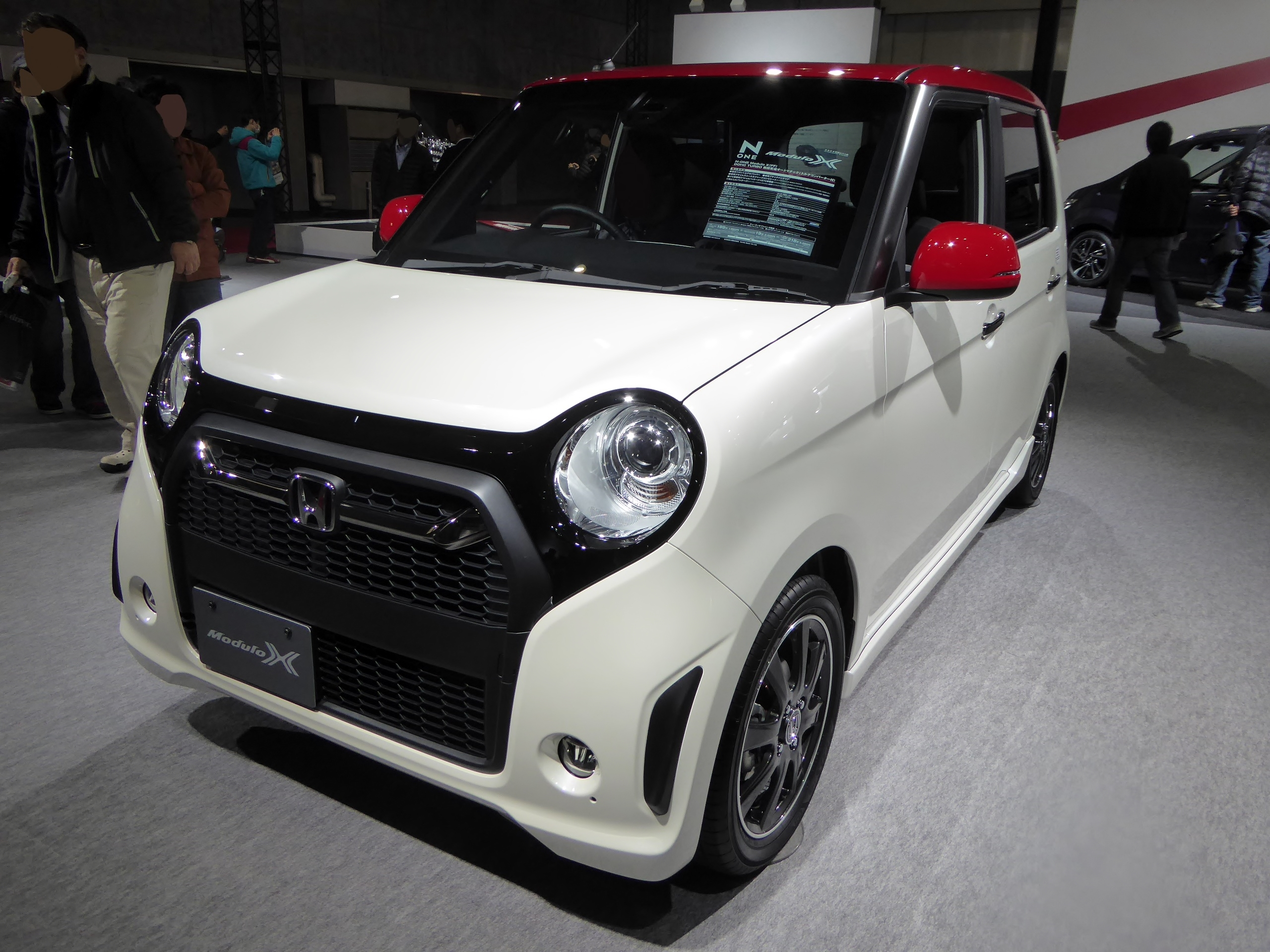
N-One Modulo X (JG1)

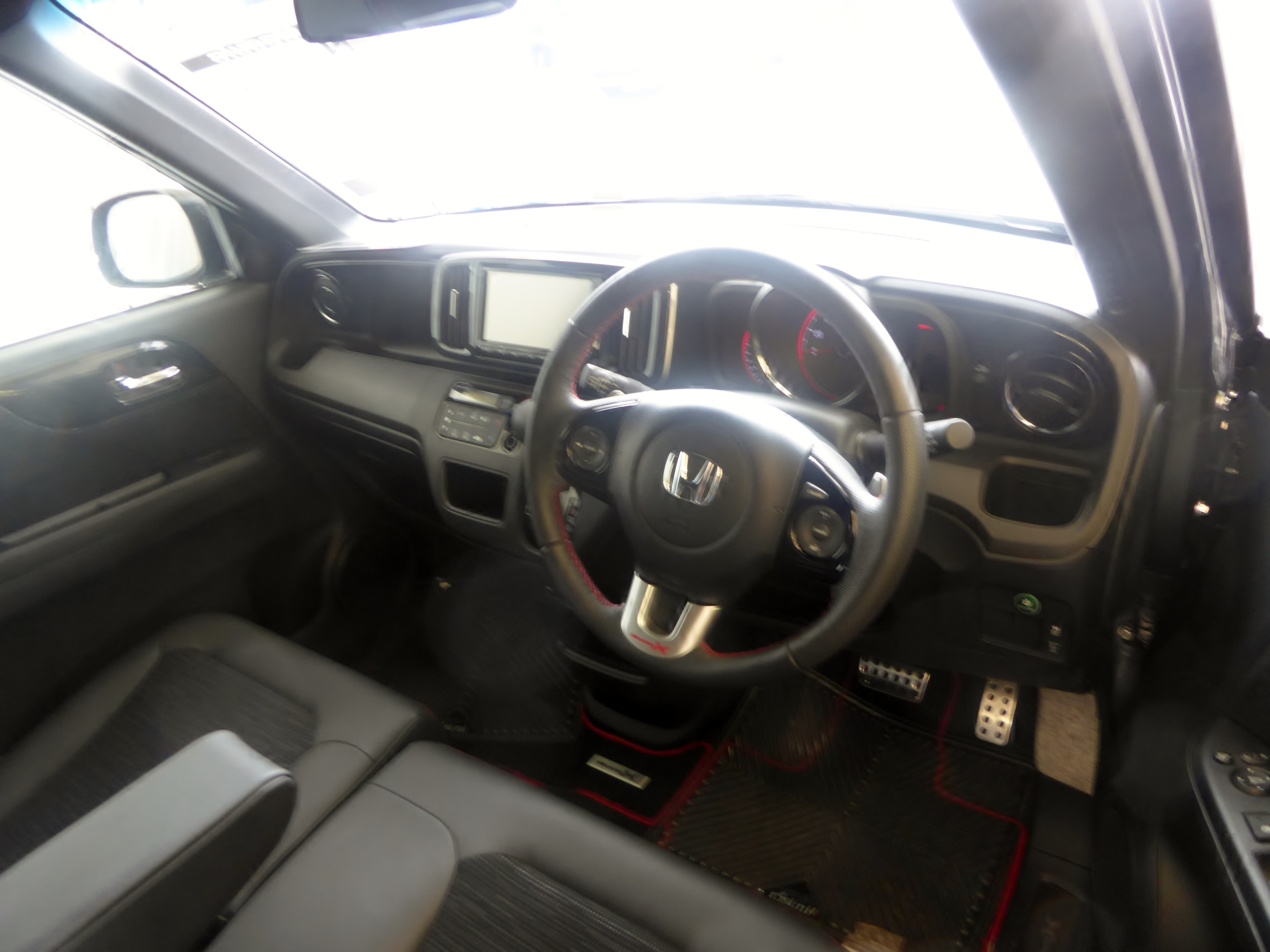
N-One Modulo X interior (JG1)

== Second generation (JG3/4/5/6; 2020) ==
Second generation
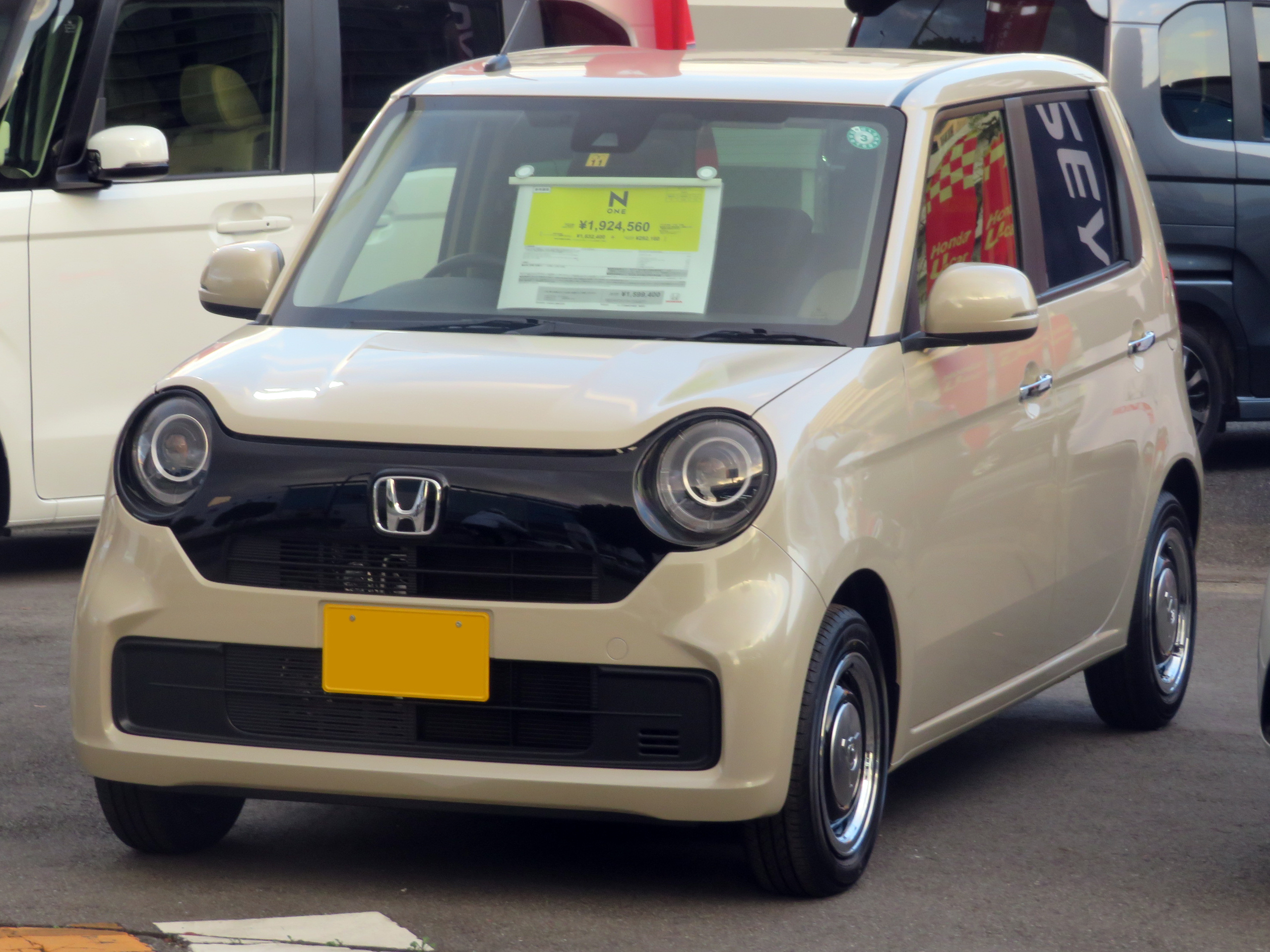
- 2020 N-One Original (JG3)

Overview
- Model code: JG3/4/5/6
- Also called: Honda Super-One (electric, widebody, except UK); Honda Super-N EV (electric, widebody, UK)
- Production: November 2020 – present; May 2026 – present (Super-One)

Body and chassis
- Layout: Front-engine, front-wheel-drive (JG3); Front-engine, four-wheel-drive (JG4); Front-motor, front-wheel-drive (electric models)

Powertrain
- Engine: Petrol: 658 cc S07B I3; 658 cc S07B turbo I3
- Electric motor: 39 kW MCF7 AC synchronous (N-One e:); 70 kW MCF7 AC synchronous (Super-One)
- Power output: 43 kW (58 PS) (S07B); 47 kW (64 PS) (S07B turbo/N-One e:); 70 kW (95 PS) (Super-One)
- Transmission: CVT; 6-speed manual (RS)
- Battery: 29.6 kWh NMC AESC (electric); 29.6 kWh LFP (electric; Thailand)
- Electric range: 295 km (183 mi) (WLTC) (N-One e:); 274 km (170 mi) (WLTC) (Super-One); 253 km (157 mi) (NEDC) (Super-One)
- Plug-in charging: 6 kW AC; 50 kW DC (electric)

Dimensions
- Wheelbase: 2,520 mm (99.2 in)
- Length: 3,395 mm (133.7 in) (Japan); 3,580 mm (140.9 in) (Super-One)
- Width: 1,475 mm (58.1 in) (Japan); 1,575 mm (62.0 in) (Super-One)
- Height: 1,545–1,570 mm (60.8–61.8 in) (Japan); 1,615 mm (63.6 in) (Super-One)
- Kerb weight: 840–910 kg (1,852–2,006 lb) (petrol); 1,030 kg (2,271 lb) (N-One e:); 1,090 kg (2,403 lb) (Super-One)

Chronology
- Predecessor: Honda e (Super-One)

The second-generation N-One went on sale in November 2020. While the sheetmetal is all-new, it is remainingly similar in design to the first generation. The lineup of the second generation started with the Original, followed by the Premium and Premium Tourer, with the sporting RS model at the top. The Tourer and RS models are fitted with the more powerful, turbocharged engine.

The second generation Honda N-One won "Kei Car of the Year Award" at Japan Car of the Year for 2021–2022.

Since the CVT variant on the RS variant was discontinued at the end of 2025, the RS is the only model available with a six-speed manual transmission; all other versions use a CVT. All-wheel drive is available on all models except the RS.

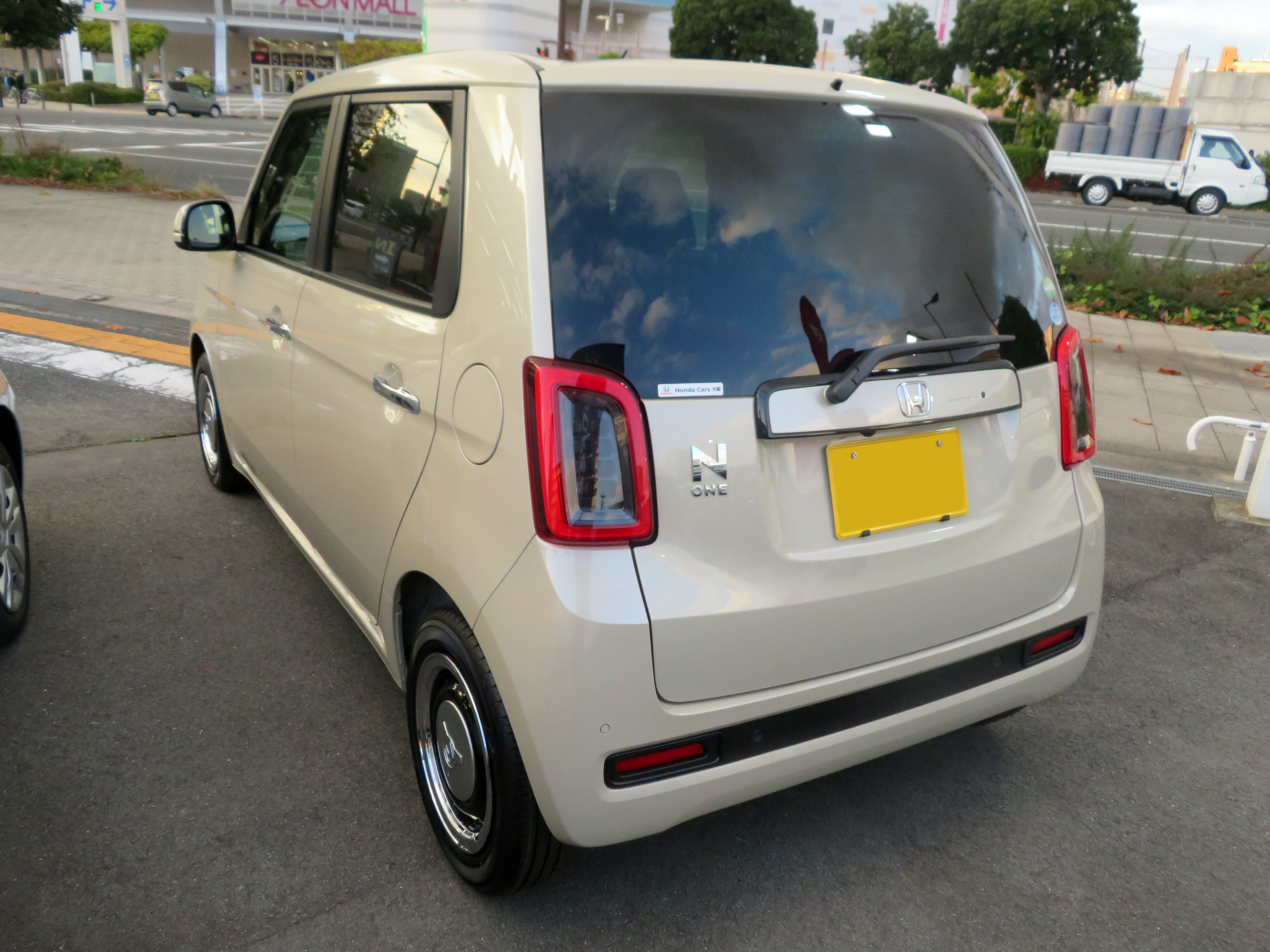
Rear view

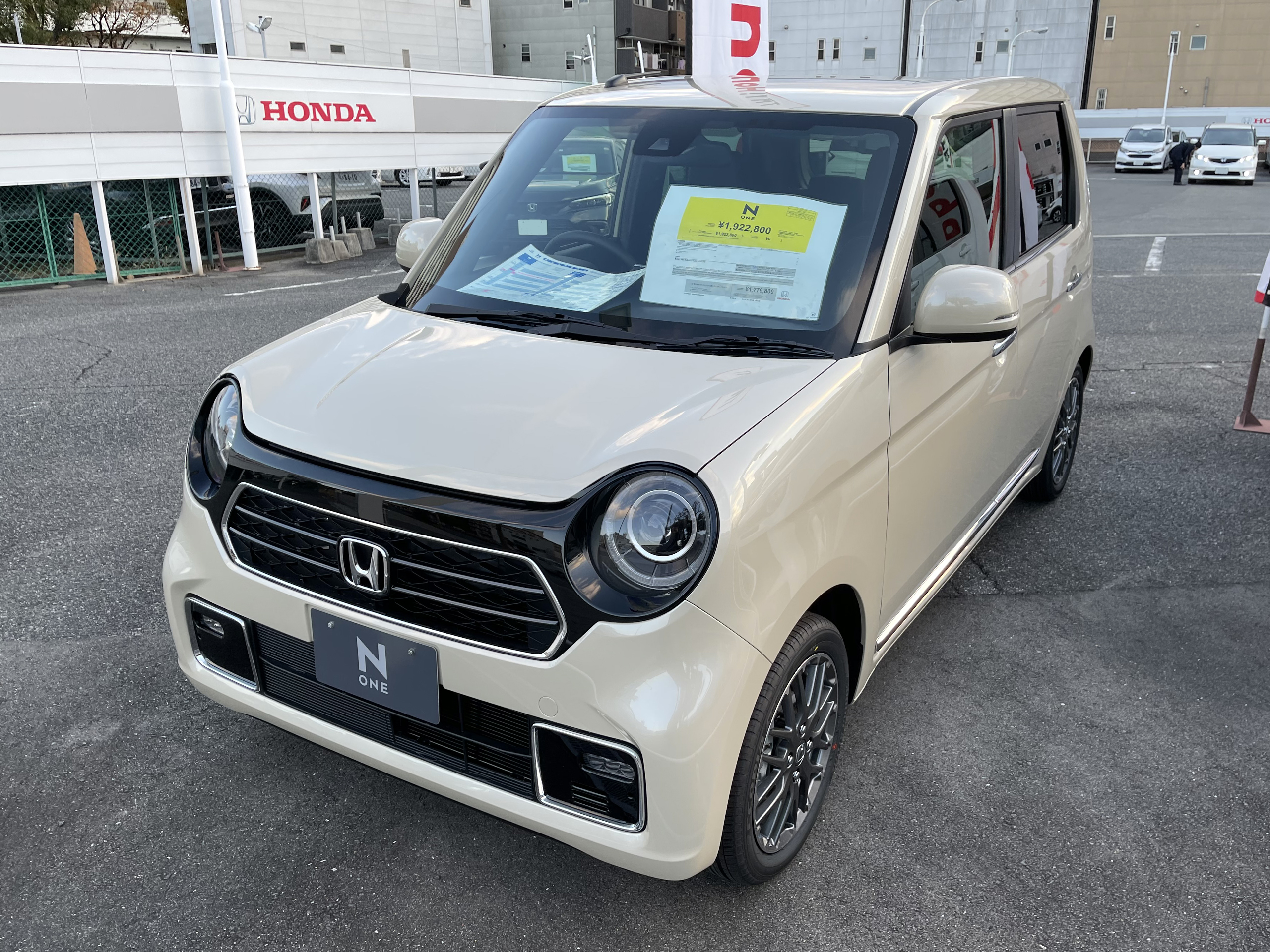
2021 N-One Premium Tourer (JG3)

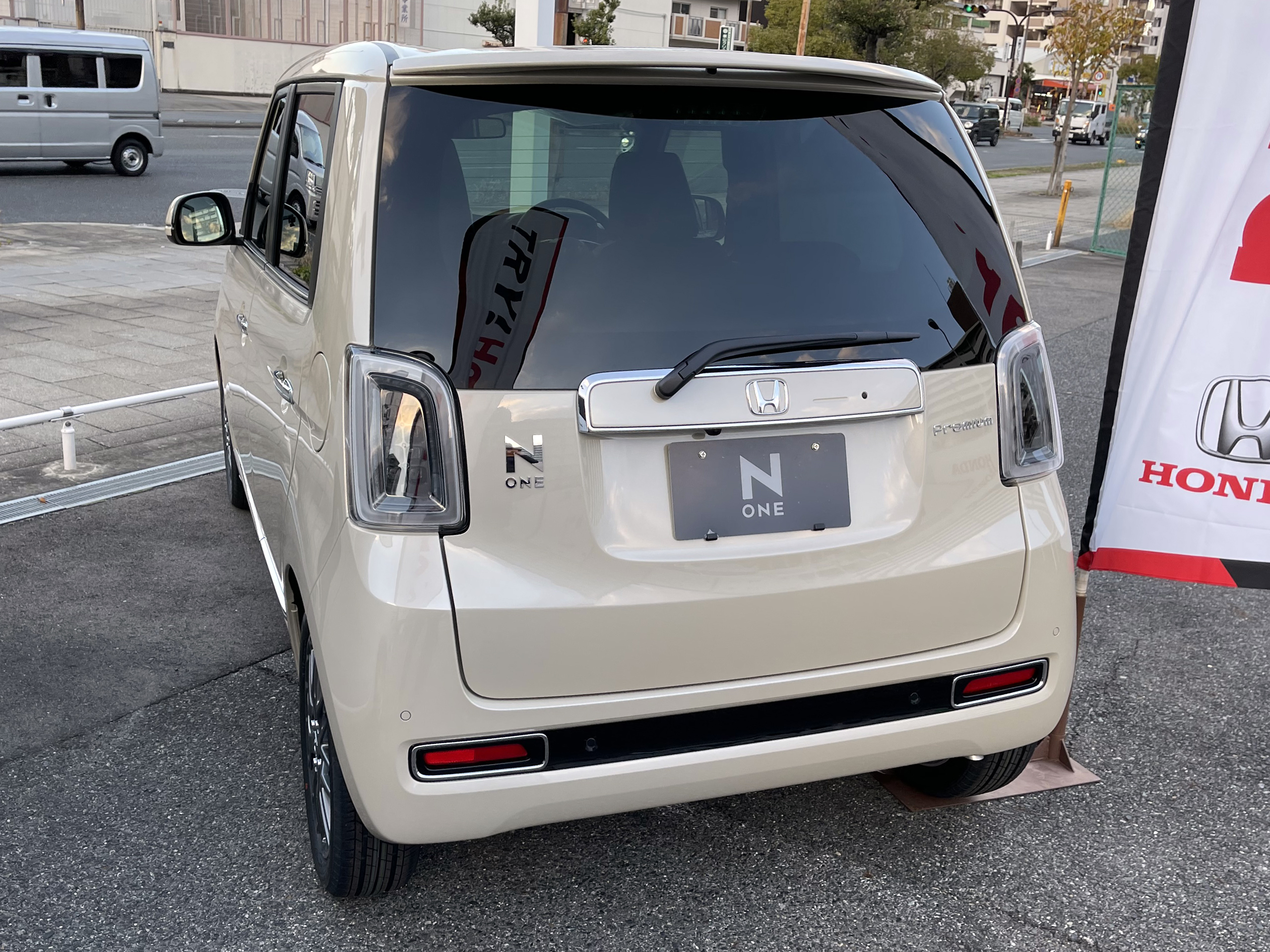
2021 N-One Premium Tourer (JG3)

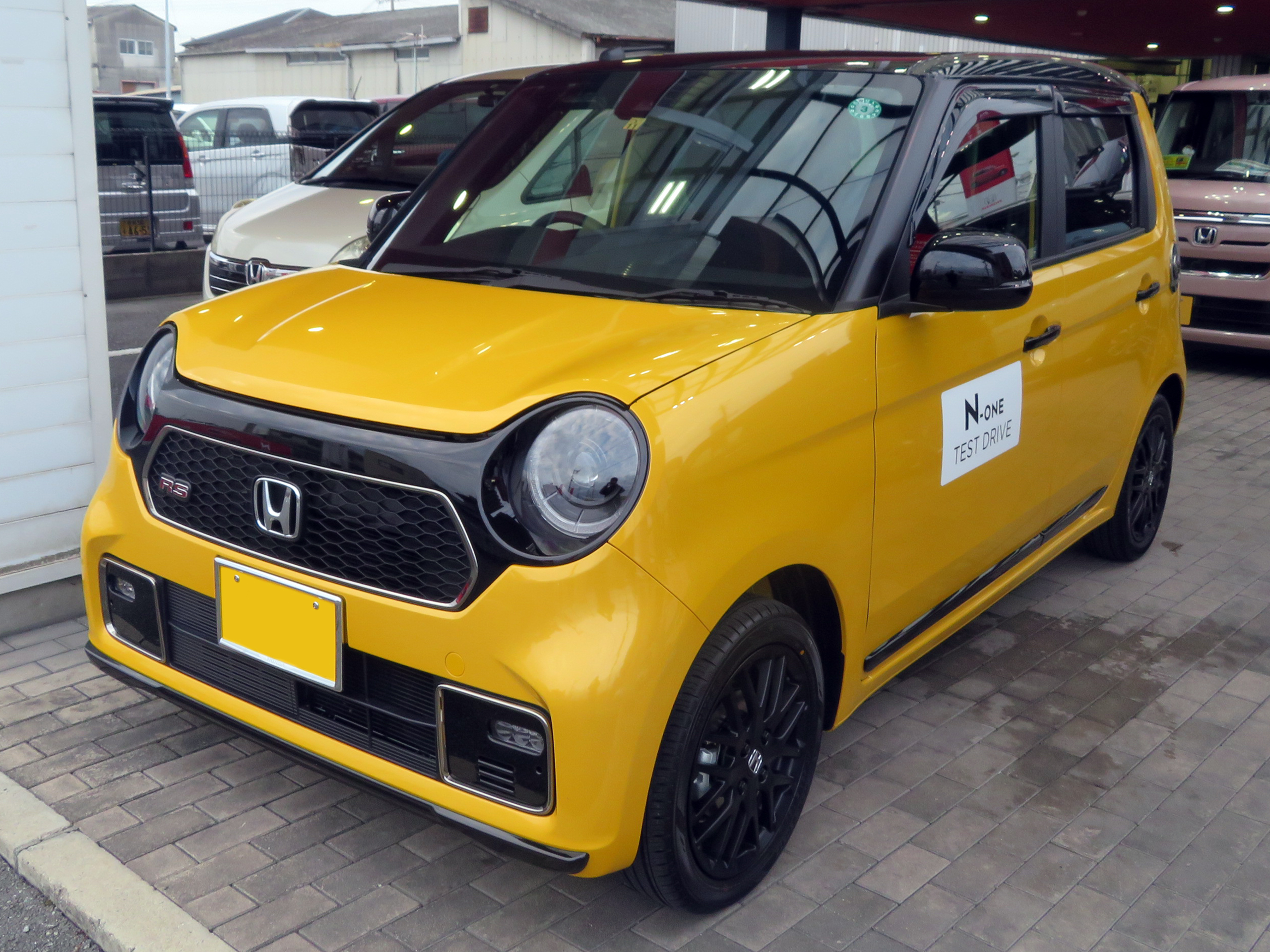
2020 N-One RS (JG3)

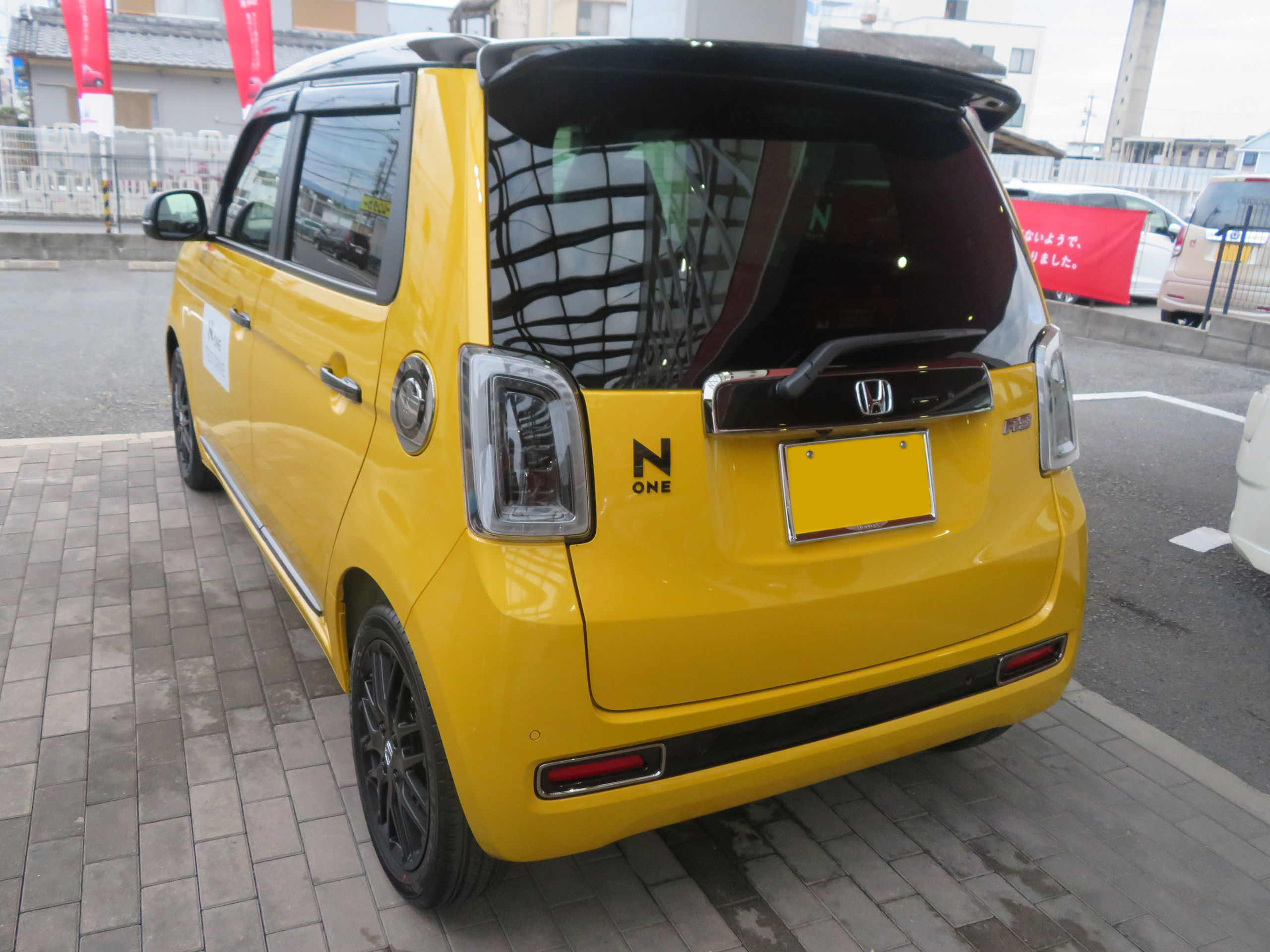
2020 N-One RS (JG3)

=== N-One RS ===
A sport version of the N-One which is the only one that had an optional manual 6 speed transmission.

The following colours were available:

- Crystal Black Pearl
- Flame Red / Rallye Red, same body color or black roof optional
- Platinum White pearl, same body color or black roof optional
- Meteoriod grey matallic, same body color or black roof optional (discontinued with later year models)
- British Green Pearl, same body color or black roof optional (discontinued with later year models)
- Autumn Yellow Pearl / Premium Yellow Pearl II, same body color or black roof optional(discontinued with later year models)
- Sunset Orange, same body color or black roof optional (discontinued in 2022)

=== N-One e ===
A battery electric version, called N-One e:, was unveiled on 28 July 2025, and went on sale on 11 September 2025. It is offered in G and L grades. This is Honda's first electric passenger car since the discontinuation of the Honda e.

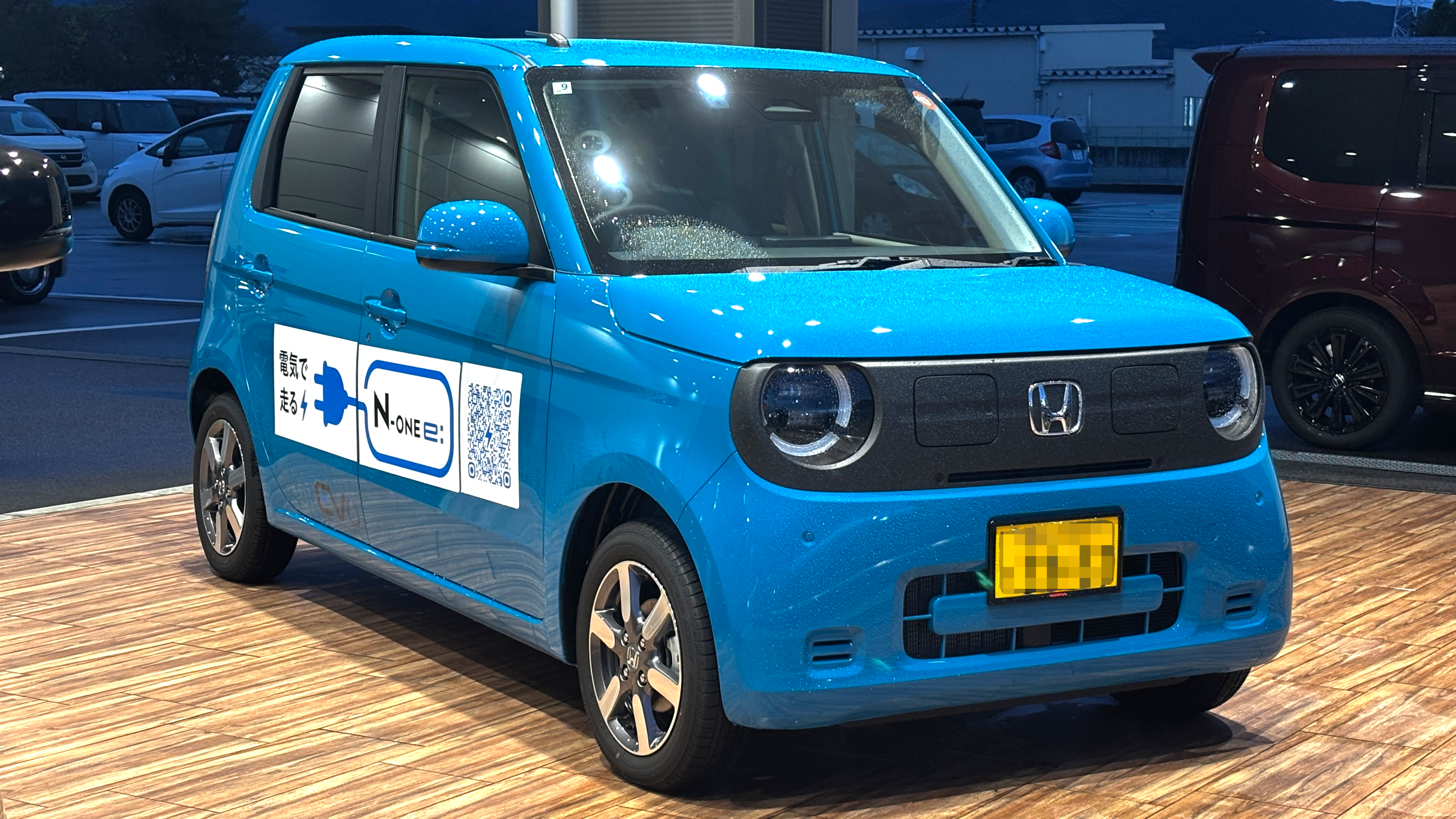
2025 N-One e:L (JG5)

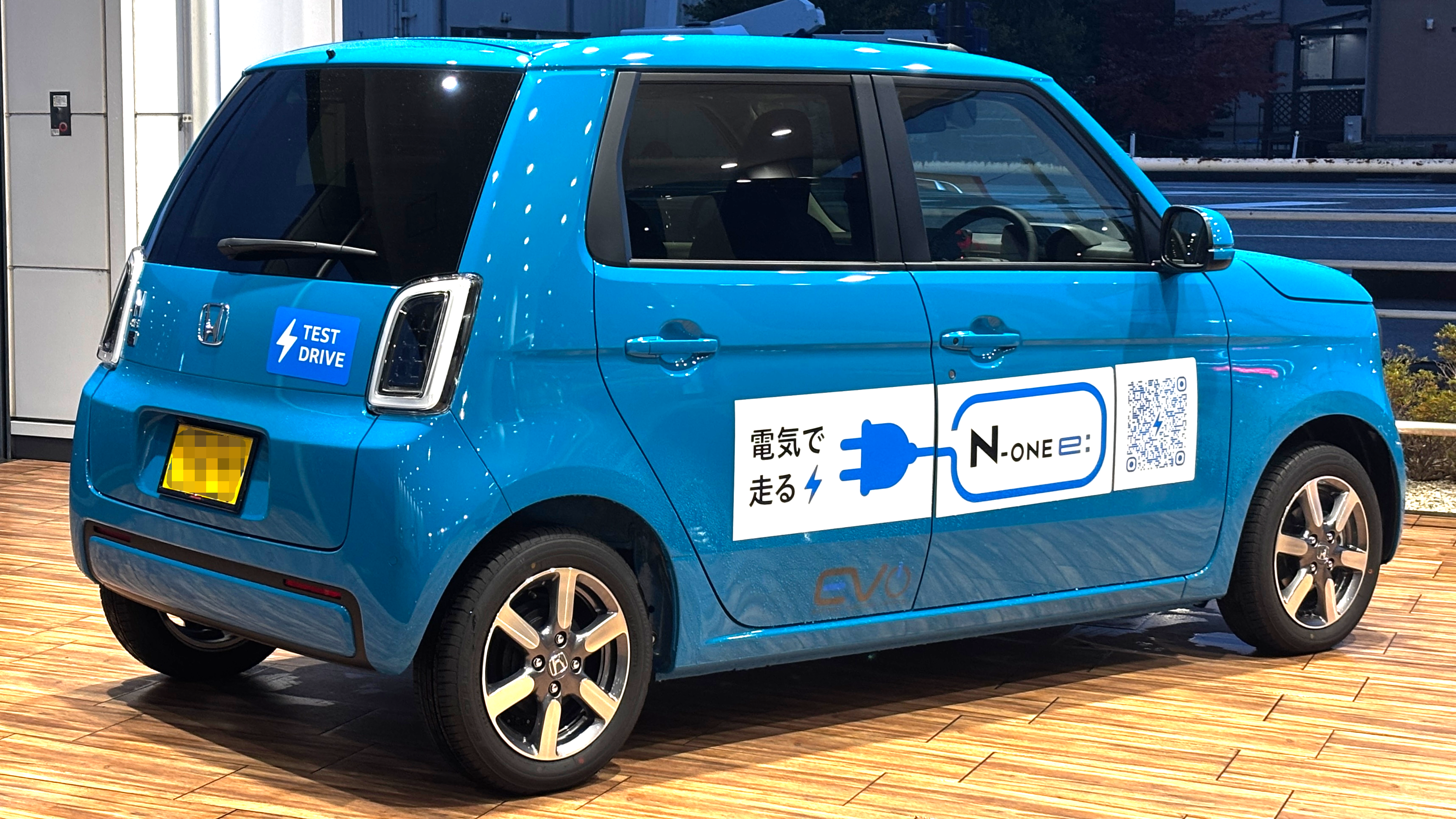
2025 N-One e:L (JG5)

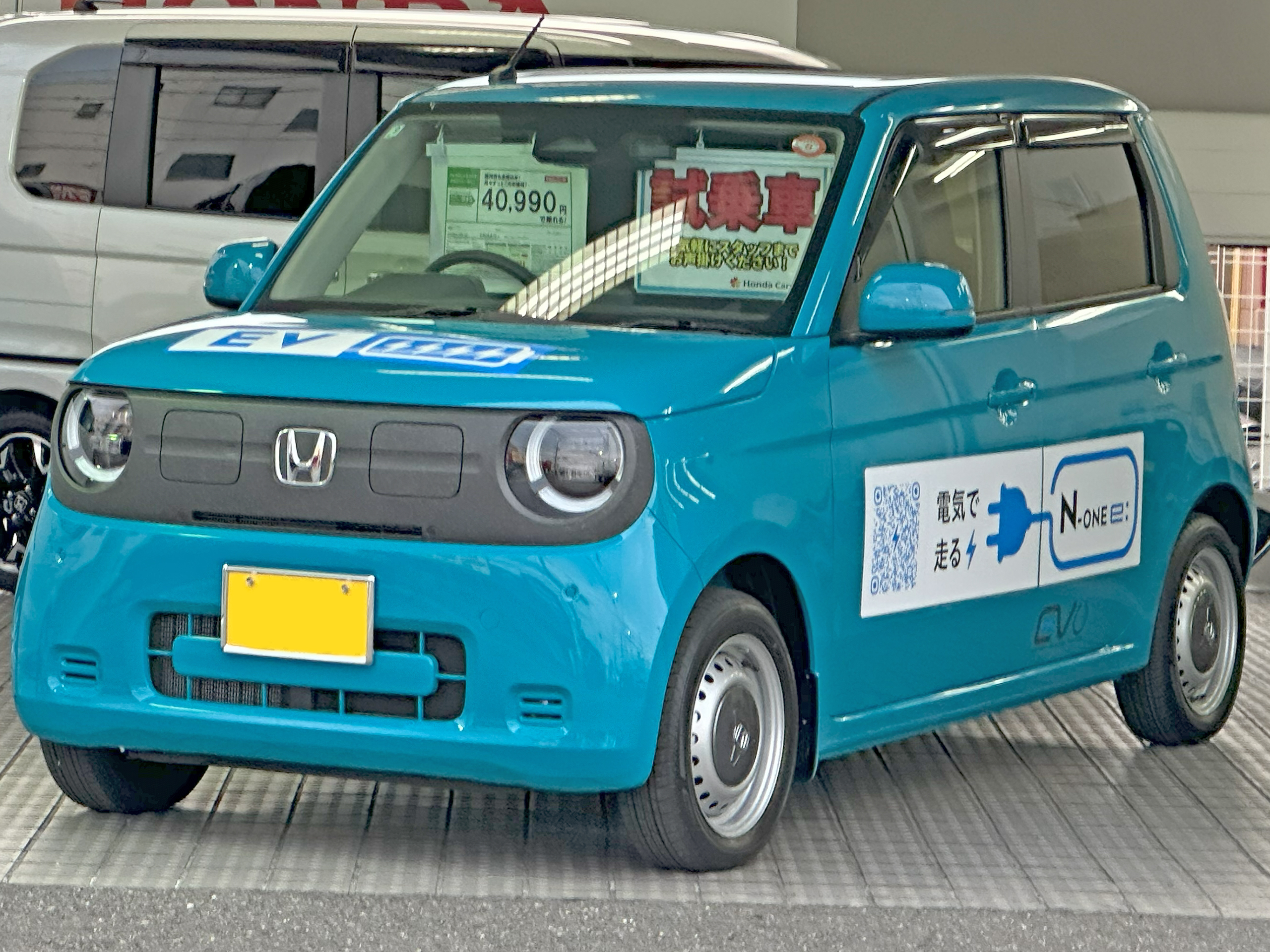
2025 N-One e:G (JG5)

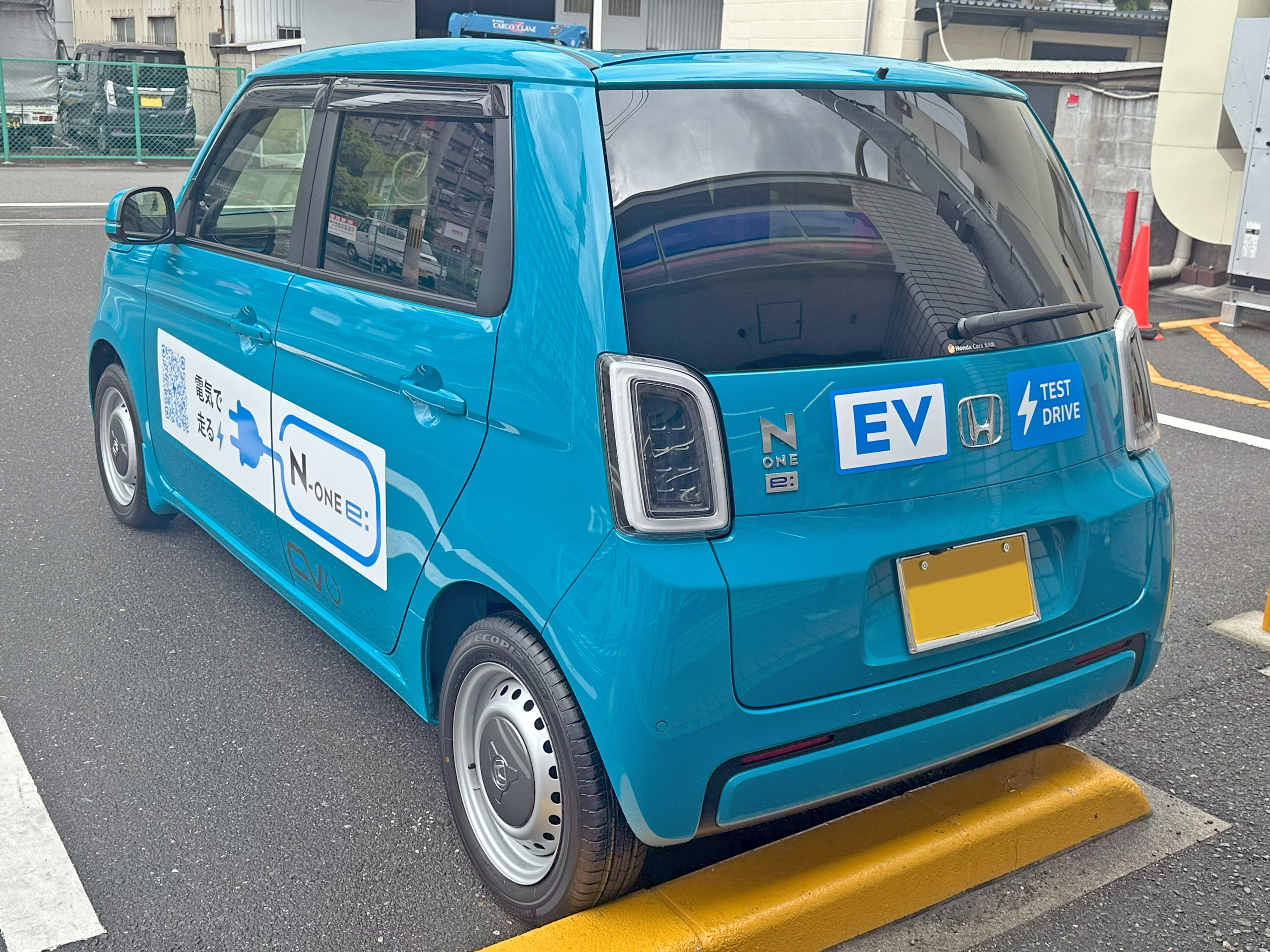
2025 N-One e:G (JG5)

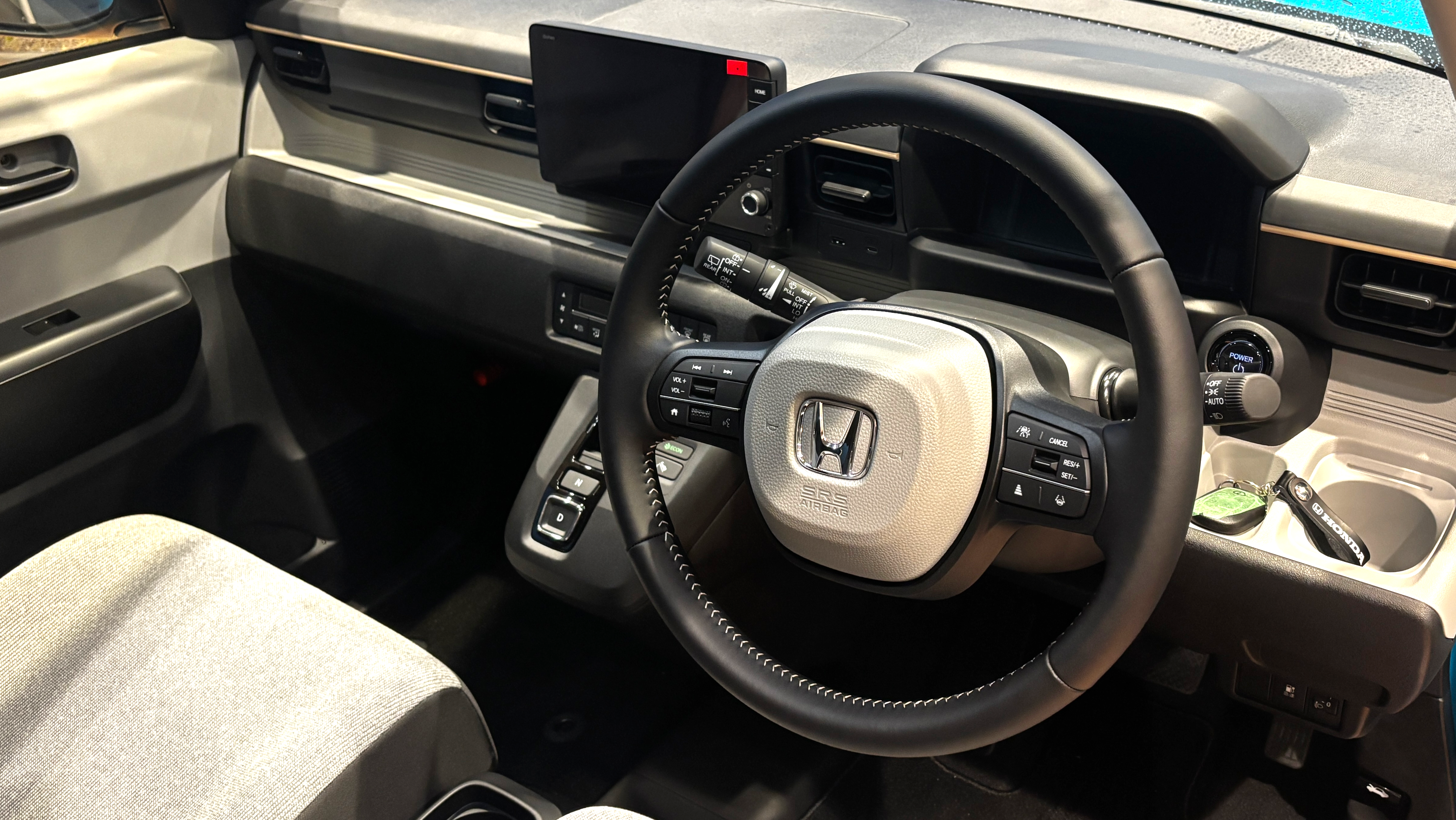
N-One e: L interior

=== Super-One / Super-N (JG6) ===
A revised, widebody version called Super-One (stylized as Super-ONE). It will be marketed in right-hand drive markets, such as Southeast Asia and the UK.

The Super-One was first exhibited at 2025 Japan Mobility Show. The wider body allows for wider wheels and a somewhat wider tread. Being longer and wider than what is permitted for the kei class and registered as a compact car. Honda offer additional power, beyond the 47 kW (64 PS) in effect for kei cars. Power is increased to 70 kW (95 PS).

The Super-One went on sale on 21 May 2026 in Japan, available in a single unnamed grade. The vehicle is styled with a retro look reminiscent of the 1983 City Turbo II called "Bulldog Style", an additional accessories inspired by the City Turbo II. The Super-ONE Sold in parallel with the smaller N-One e

The Super-One was unveiled in Indonesia on 13 July 2026, and made its first auto show debut at the 33rd Gaikindo Indonesia International Auto Show in August and limited sale 100 units.

The Super-One went on sale on 4 August 2026 in Australia, available in a sole unnamed variant.

The Super-One was unveiled in Thailand on 14 August 2026, available in a sole unnamed variant and limited sale 30 units.

The Super-One was launched in Brunei on 5 September 2026 alongside with the ZR-V and it is only available in a sole unnamed variant.

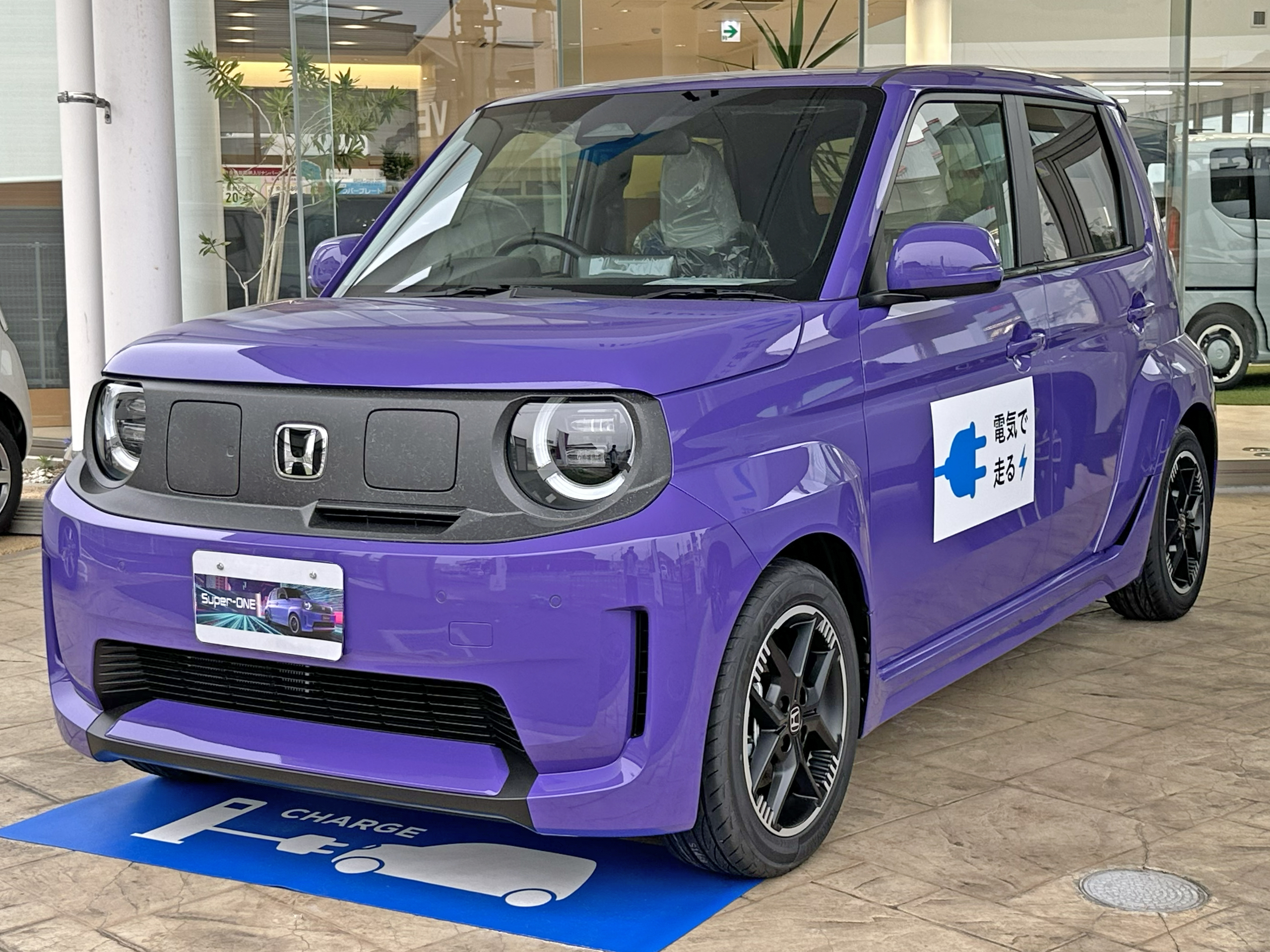
2026 Honda Super-One EV (JG6)

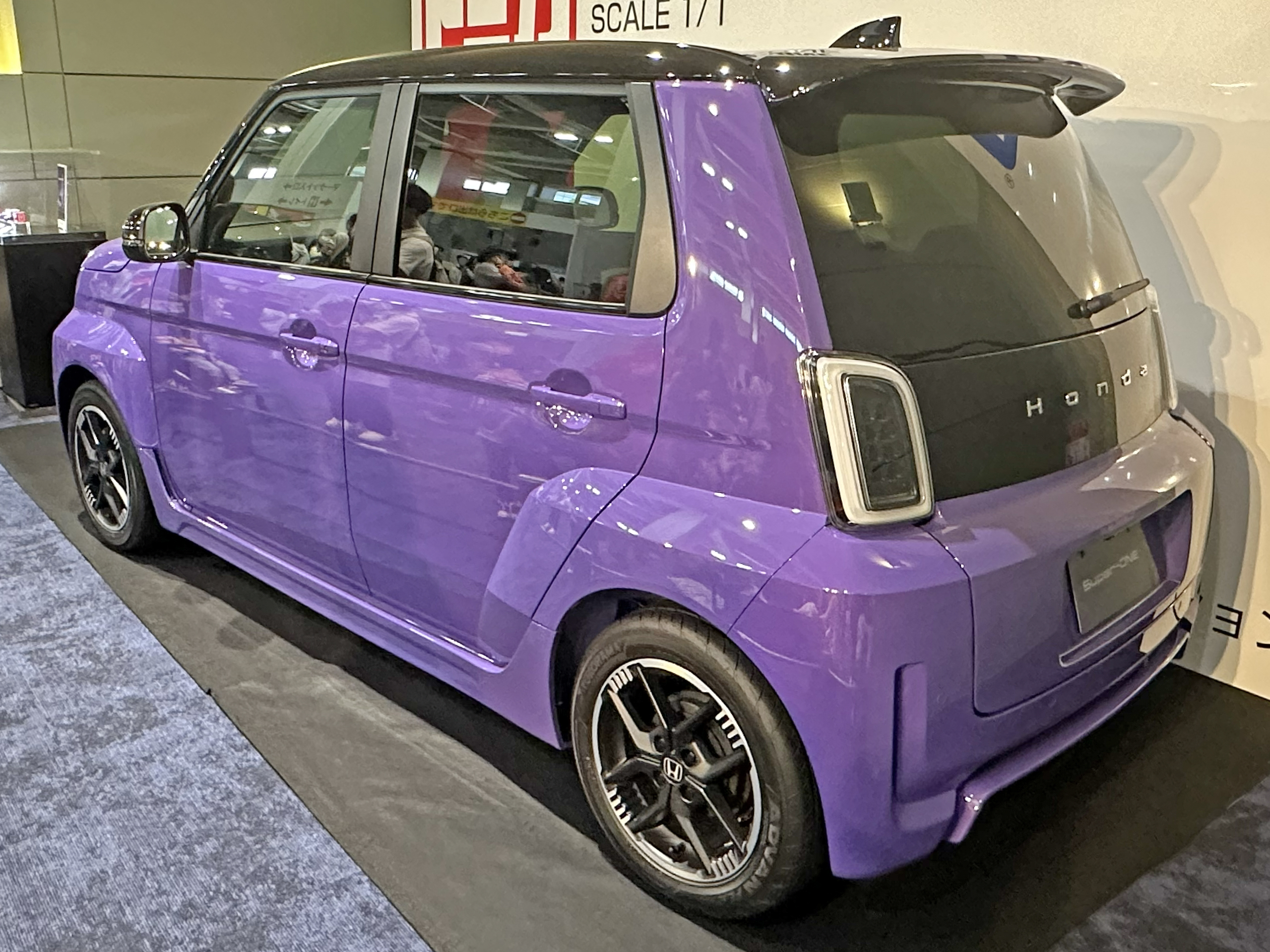
Rear view

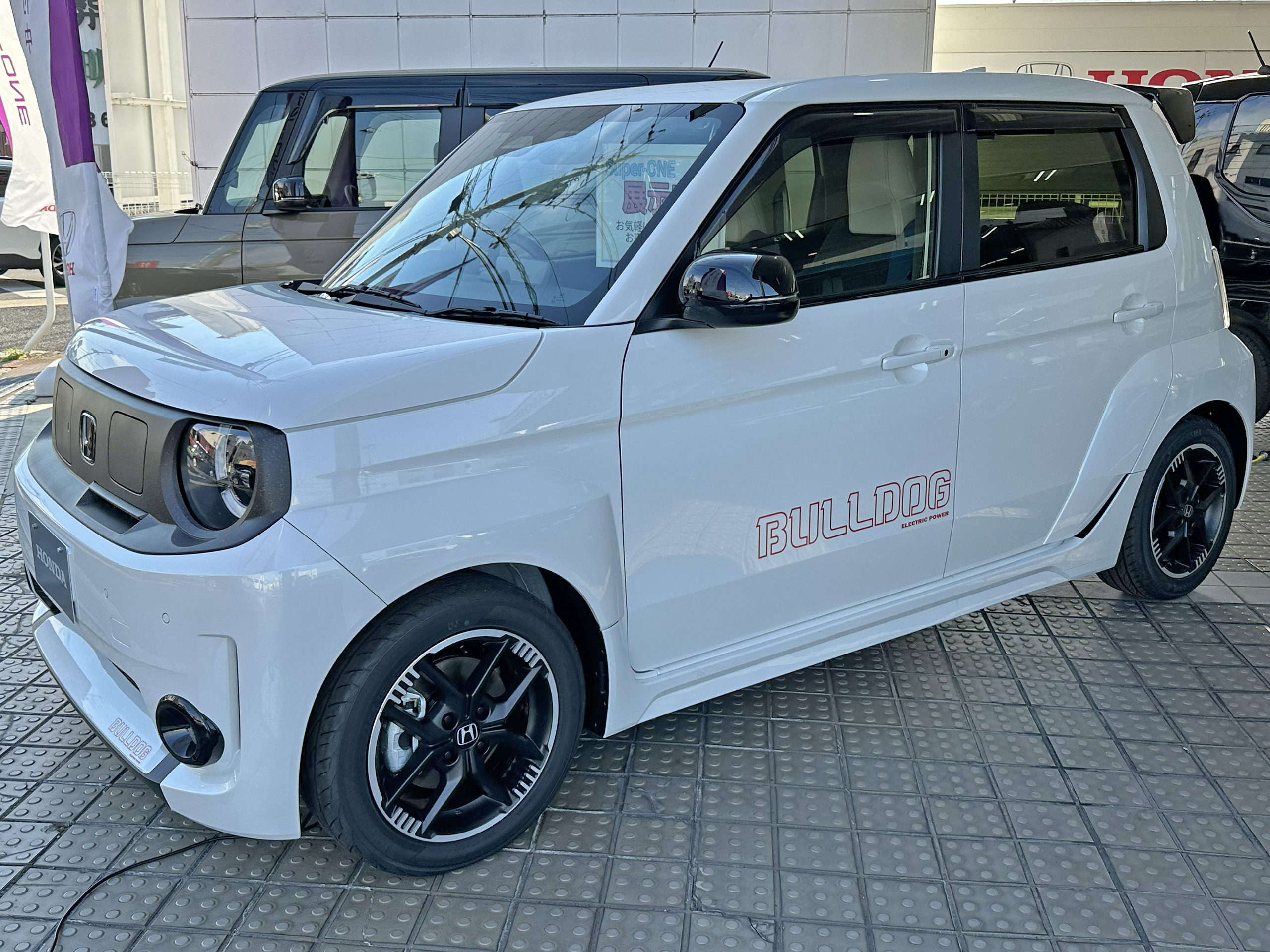
Honda Super-One with Bulldog Style accessories

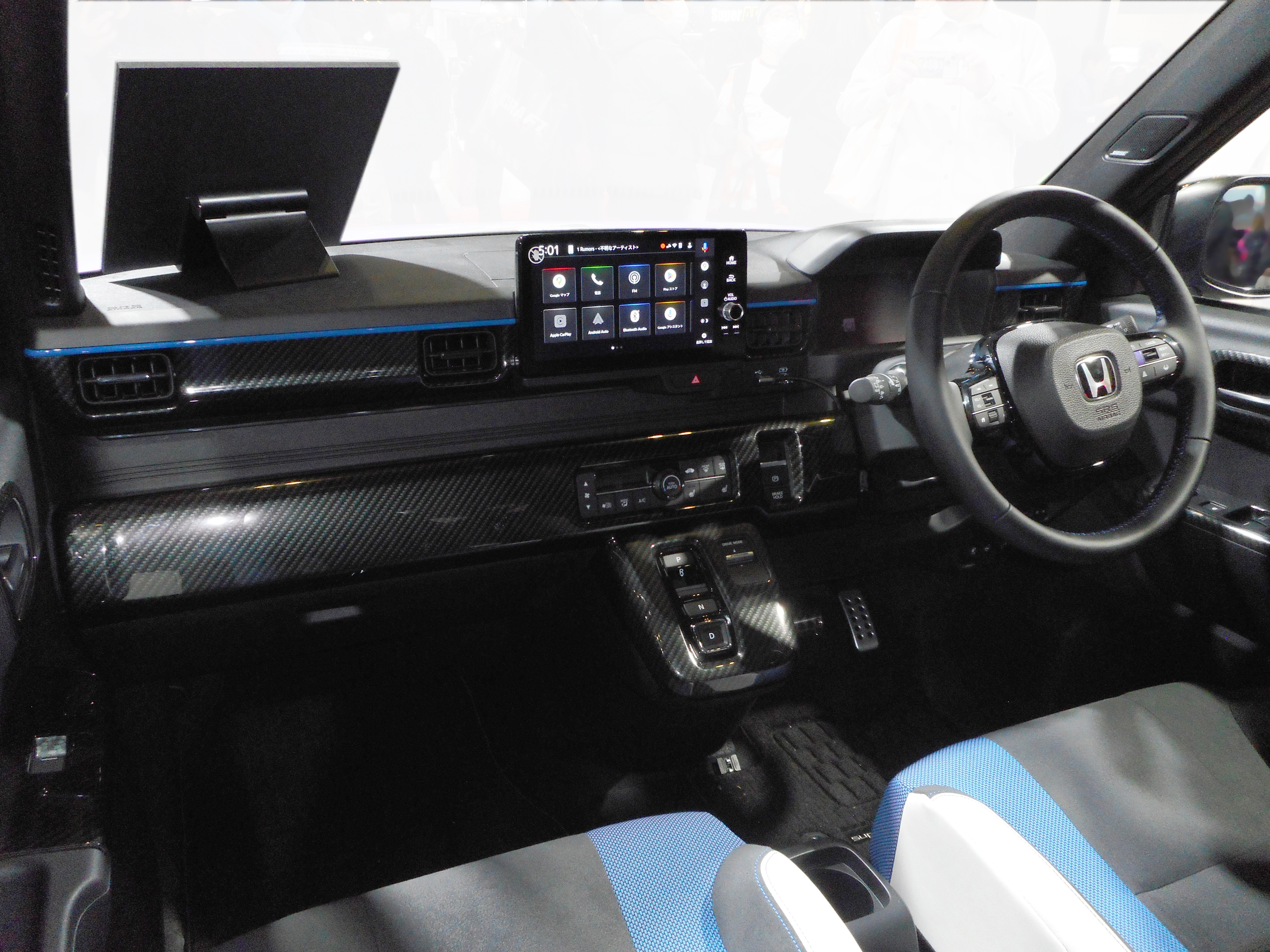
Interior

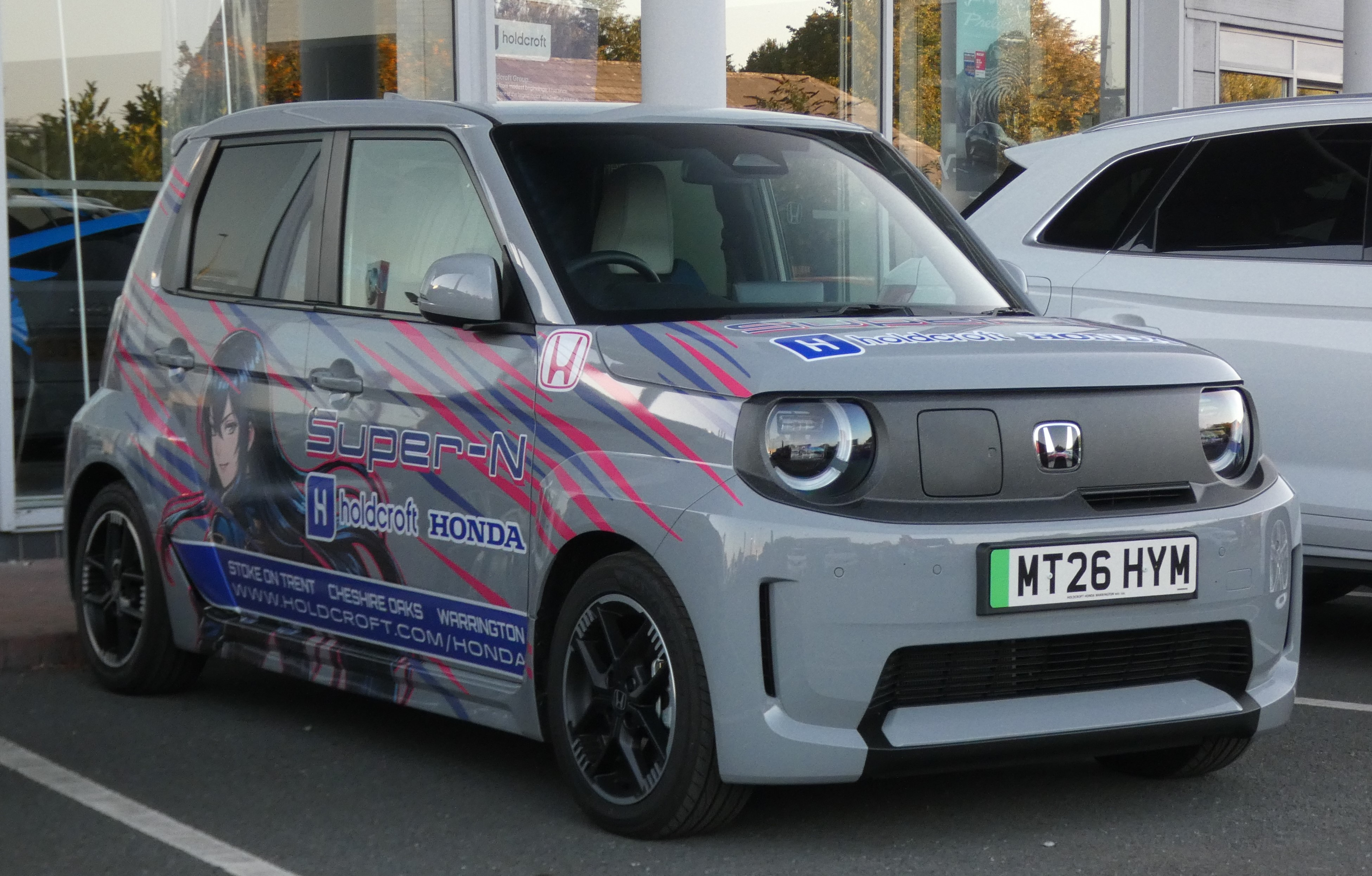
Honda Super-N (UK)

== Motorsports ==
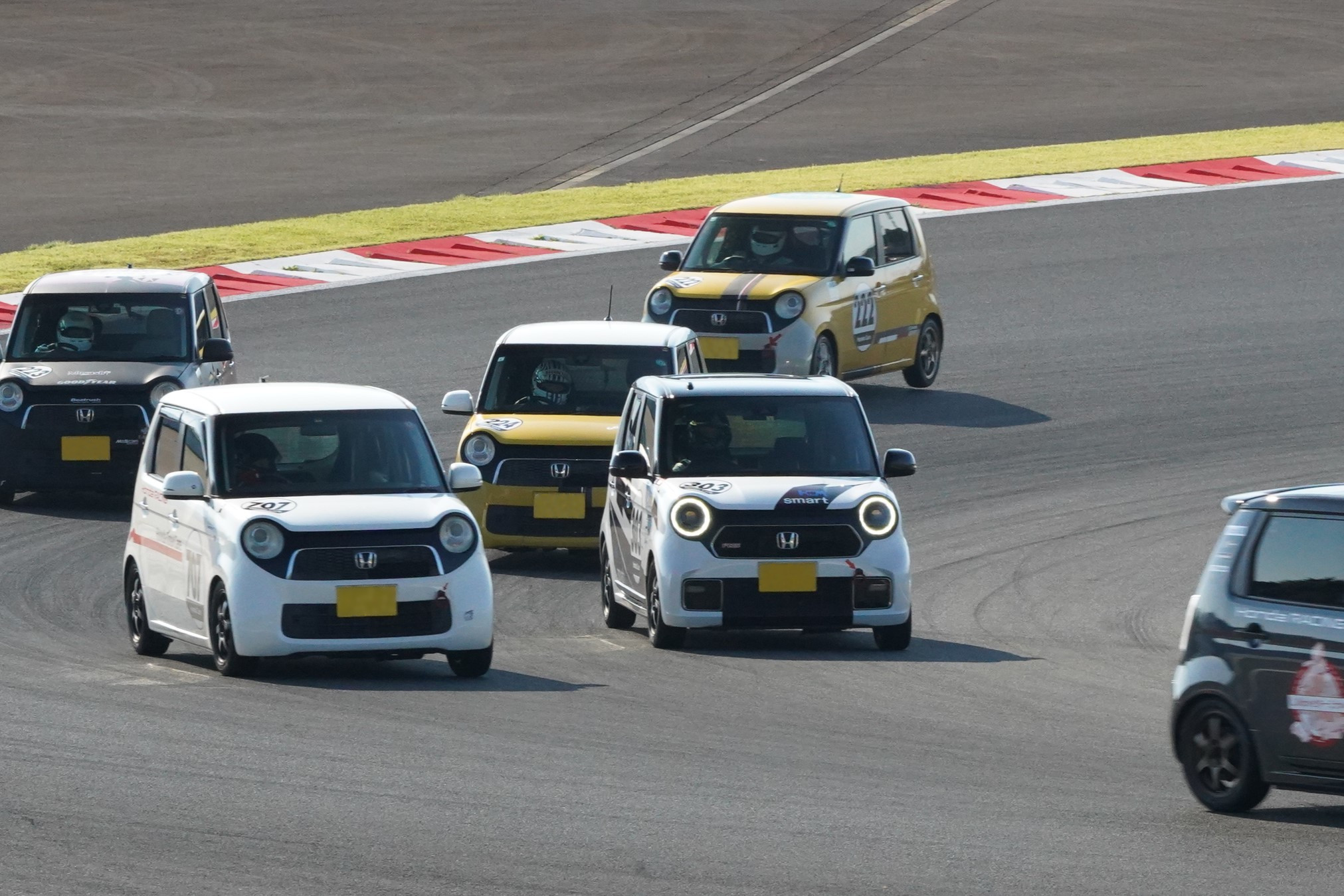
2014 inaugural N-One Owners Cup season at Fuji Speedway

Since 2014, Honda has been organizing the “N-ONE Owner's Cup,” a one-maker spec racing series featuring the N-One. Similar to Toyota's Vitz Race, this is a race for “street-legal vehicles”; participants can compete by adding racing equipment, such as roll cages and four-point seat belts, in their production cars

In its inaugural year of 2014, a total of 10 races (2 exhibition races + 8 series races) were held across 7 circuits in Japan, including in Suzuka Circuit and in Mobility Resort Motegi.

Starting in 2026, the N-One is eligible to race in the “SC-N” class of the new “Super Taikyu Challenge,” a new second-tier racing series under the Super Taikyu racing series umbrella.

== Sales ==
Year	Japan
2012	17,988
2013	107,584
2014	34,808
2015	22,829
2016	17,260
2017	13,059
2018	16,353
2019	15,462
2020	15,462
2021	20,930
2022	18,712
2023	19,703
2024	17,830
2025	20,802
