= Timeline of Japanese automobiles =

This is a list of automobiles produced for the general public in the Japanese market. They are listed in chronological order from when each model began its model year. If a model did not have continuous production, it is listed again on the model year production resumed. Concept cars and submodels are not listed unless they are themselves notable.

== 1907 ==
- Takuri Type 3 (1907)

== 1910 ==
- Kunisue (1910)

== 1911 ==
- Ford Model T (1911–1927)

== 1914 ==
- DAT (1914)

== 1917 ==
- Mitsubishi Model A (1917–1921)

== 1920 ==
- Gorham (1920–1921)

== 1921 ==
- Ales (1921)

== 1923 ==
- Lila (1923–1925)

== 1924 ==
- Otomo (1924–1927)

== 1926 ==
- Chevrolet Capitol (1926–1927)

== 1931 ==
- Mazdago (1931–1958)

== 1932 ==
- Datsun Roadster (1932–1941)
- Datsun Type 10 (1932)
- Datsun Type 11 (1932)

== 1933 ==
- Datsun Type 12 (1933)

== 1934 ==
- Mitsubishi PX33 (1934–1937)
- Ohta Model OS (1934)

== 1935 ==
- Datsun Type 14 (1935–1936)
- Toyota A1 (1935)

== 1936 ==
- Datsun 15T (1936–1938)
- Datsun Type 15 (1936–1937)
- Kurogane Type 95 (1936–1944)
- Ohta Model OC (1936)
- Toyota AA/AB (1936–1943)

== 1937 ==
- Datsun Type 16 (1937–1938)
- Ohta Model OD (1937–1939)

== 1938 ==
- Datsun 17T (1938–1944)
- Datsun Type 17 (1938–1944)
- Toyota EA (1938)

== 1939 ==
(Resources were diverted to military materials)

== 1940 ==
- Toyota BA (1940–1943)

== 1941 ==
- Toyota AE (1941–1943)

== 1942 ==
(Resources were diverted to military materials)

== 1943 ==
- Toyota AC (1943–1944)

== 1944 ==
(Resources were diverted to military materials)

== 1945 ==
(Resources were diverted to military materials)

== 1946 ==
- Mitsubishi Mizushima (1946–1962)

== 1947 ==
- Datsun DA (1947–1948)
- Kurogane Sanrin (1947–1956)
- Toyopet SA (1947–1952)
- Toyopet SB (1947–1952)
- Toyota AC (1947–1948)
- Ohta Model PA (1947–1957)
- Ohta Model PB (1947–1957)
- Ohta Model PE (1947–1957)
- Ohta Model OE (1947–1957)
- Ohta Model PK-1 (1947–1957)
- Ohta Model VK-2 (1947–1957)

== 1948 ==
- Datsun DB (1948)

== 1949 ==
- Datsun DB-2 (1949–1950)
- Toyopet SD (1949–1951)

== 1950 ==
- Datsun DS (1950)
- Hino TH-series (1950–1968)

== 1951 ==
- Daihatsu Bee (1951–1952)
- Datsun DB-4 (1951–1953)
- Datsun DS-2 (1951–1952)
- Mitsubishi Henry J (1951–1954)
- Nissan Patrol 4W60 (1951–1960)
- Toyota Land Cruiser BJ/FJ (1951–1955)
- Toyopet SF (1951–1953)

== 1952 ==
- Datsun DC-3 (1952)
- Datsun DS-4 (1952–1953)
- Prince Sedan (1952–1957)
- Toyopet SG (1952–1954)

== 1953 ==
- Datsun DB-5 (1953–1954)
- Datsun DS-5 (1953–1954)
- Hino 4CV (1953–1961)
- Isuzu Hillman Minx (1953–1956)
- Mitsubishi Jeep J3 (1953–1955)
- Toyopet SA (1953–1955)

== 1954 ==
- Datsun DB-6 (1954)
- Datsun DS-6 Convar (1954)
- Subaru 1500 (1954)
- Toyota Stout RK (1954–1960)

== 1955 ==
- Datsun 110 Series (1955–1957)
- Datsun 120/220 truck (1955–1961)
- Mitsubishi Jeep J10 (1955)
- Suzuki Suzulight (1955–1958)
- Toyopet Master series RR (1955–1956)
- Toyota Crown RS-S30 Model (1955–1962)
- Toyota Land Cruiser J20/J30 (1955–1960)

== 1956 ==
- Isuzu Hillman Minx (1956–1964)
- Mitsubishi Jeep J11 (1956–1958)
- Nissan Junior B40 (1956–1960)
- Toyopet Dyna route truck RK52 (1956–1957)
- Toyota ToyoAce (1956–1959)

== 1957 ==
- Daihatsu Midget (1957–1972)
- Kurogane Mighty (1957–1962)
- Mazda T–2000 (1957–1974)
- Datsun 210 Series (1957–1959)
- Nissan Caball C40 (1957–1960)
- Prince Miller (1957–1970)
- Prince Skyline ALSI-1 Series (1957–1964)
- Prince Skyway (1957–1967)
- Kurogane KE/VM (1957–1959)
- Toyopet Dyna route truck RK60-80 (1957–1959)
- Toyota Corona T10 (1957–1960)

== 1958 ==
- Isuzu Hillman Minx Super de Luxe (1958–1964)
- Mitsubishi Jeep JC3 (1958–1960)
- Prince Light Coach (1958–1963)
- Subaru 360 (1958–1971)

== 1959 ==
- Datsun Bluebird 310 (1959–1963)
- Datsun Sports 1000 S211 (1959–1960)
- Hino Commerce PB (1959–1960)
- Kurogane Baby (1959–1961)
- Kurogane Nova 1500 (KN) (1959–1962)
- Mazda K360 (1959–1969)
- Prince Gloria BLSI (1959–1963)
- Suzuki Suzulight (1959–1962)
- Toyota Dyna K70-160 (1959–1963)
- Toyota ToyoAce (1959–1971)

== 1960 ==
- Daihatsu Hijet L35/L36 (1960–1966)
- Datsun Fairlady 1200 SPL212/SPL213 (1960–1962)
- Mazda R360 (1960–1966)
- Mitsubishi 500 (1960–1962)
- Mitsubishi Jeep J20/J38/J53/J54/J58 (1960–1998)
- Nissan Caball C140 (1960–1966)
- Nissan Cedric 30 (1960–1962)
- Nissan Junior B140 (1960–1962)
- Toyota Corona T20/T30 (1960–1964)
- Toyota Land Cruiser J40 (1960–1984)
- Toyota Stout RK100/RK101 (1960–1978)

== 1961 ==
- Datsun 320 truck (1961–1965)
- Hino Briska FG series (1961–1965)
- Hino Contessa PC series (1961–1964)
- Isuzu Bellel (1961–1967)
- Mazda B360/B600 (1961–1968)
- Mazda B1500 (BUA61) (1961–1965)
- Mitsubishi 360 LT22 (1961–1964)
- Subaru Sambar (first generation) (1961–1966)
- Suzuki Carry FB/FBD (1961–1965)
- Toyota Publica P10 (1961–1966)

== 1962 ==
- Isuzu BU (1963–1972)
- Mazda Carol 600 (1962–1964)
- Mazda Carol (KPDA) (1962–1970)
- Mitsubishi Colt 600 (1962–1965)
- Mitsubishi Minica sedan (1962–1969)
- Nissan Cedric 31 (1962–1965)
- Prince Gloria S40/W40/S44 (1962–1967)
- Nissan Junior 40 (1962–1966)
- Suzuki Suzulight Fronte (1962–1967)
- Toyota Crown S40 Model (1962–1967)

== 1963 ==
- Daihatsu Compagno (1963–1970)
- Daihatsu New Line L50 (1963–1966)
- Datsun Bluebird 410 (1963–1967)
- Datsun Fairlady 1500 SPL310/SP310 (1963–1965)
- Honda S500 (1963–1964)
- Honda T360 (1963–1967)
- Isuzu Bellett (1963–1973)
- Isuzu Bellett Wasp (1963–1972)
- Mazda Familia (1963–1968)
- Mitsubishi Colt 1000 (A20) (1963–1966)
- Prince Light Coach (1963–1976)
- Prince 1900 Sprint (1963) (Concept Car)
- Prince Skyline S50 Series (1963–1968)
- Suzuki Suzulight (1963–1969)
- Toyota Dyna K170 (1963–1968)

== 1964 ==
- Daihatsu Hijet S35/S36 (1964–1968)
- Hino Contessa PD series (1964–1969)
- Honda S600 (1964–1966)
- Mitsubishi Debonair (A3 Series) (1964–1986)
- Toyota Corona T40/T50 (1964–1970)
- Toyota Crown Eight (1964–1967)
- Toyota Crown S50 Model (1967–1971)

== 1965 ==
- Datsun 520/521 (1965–1972)
- Datsun Fairlady 1600 SPL311/SP311 (1965–1970)
- Hino Briska FH series (1965–1968)
- Honda L700 (1965–1966)
- Mazda B1500/Proceed (1965–1977)
- Mitsubishi Colt 800 (1965–1966)
- Mitsubishi Colt 1500 (A25) (1965–1970)
- Nissan Caravan (1965–1973)
- Nissan Cedric 130 (1965–1971)
- Nissan Patrol 60 (1965–1980)
- Nissan President H150 (1965–1973)
- Nissan Silvia (CSP311) (1965–1968)
- Suzuki Carry L20 (1965–1969)
- Suzuki Fronte 800 C10 (1965–1969)
- Toyota Sports 800 (1965–1969)

== 1966 ==
- Daihatsu Fellow (1967–1970)
- Daihatsu New Line S50 (1966–1968)
- Datsun Sunny B10 (1966–1969)
- Honda L800 (1966–1967)
- Honda S800 (1966–1970)
- Mazda Luce 1500 (1966–1973)
- Mazda Bongo (1966–1975)
- Mitsubishi Colt 1000F (1966–1968)
- Mitsubishi Colt 1100 (A21) (1966–1968)
- Mitsubishi Minicab LT30 (1966–1971)
- Nissan Caball C240 (1966–1976)
- Nissan Junior 41 (1966–1970)
- Nissan Prince Clipper T65 (1966–1972)
- Nissan Prince Royal (1966–1967)
- Prince Homer T640 (1966–1968)
- Subaru 1000 (1966–1969)
- Subaru Sambar (second generation) (1966–1973)
- Suzuki Carry L30 (1966–1969)
- Toyota Corolla E10 (1966–1970)
- Toyota Publica P20 (1966–1969)

== 1967 ==
- Datsun Bluebird 510 (1967–1972)
- Datsun Fairlady 2000 SRL311/SR311 (1967–1970)
- Honda N360 (1967–1972)
- Honda TN360 (1967–1969)
- Isuzu Florian (1967–1977)
- Isuzu Unicab (1967–1974)
- Mazda Cosmo L10A (1967–1968)
- Mazda Familia (1967–1977)
- Mitsubishi 360 LT25 (1967–1969)
- Nissan Gloria A30 (1967–1971)
- Suzuki Fronte 360 sedan (1967–1970)
- Toyota 2000GT (1967–1970)
- Toyota Century G20/G30/G40 (1967–1997)
- Toyota HiAce H10 (1967–1977)
- Toyota Land Cruiser J50 (1967–1980)

== 1968 ==
- Daihatsu Hijet S37 (1968–1972)
- Datsun Skyline C10 (1968–1972)
- Isuzu 117 Coupé (1968–1977)
- Mazda Cosmo L10B (1968–1972)
- Mazda Familia R100 (1968–1973)
- Mazda Luce 1800 (1968–1973)
- Mazda Porter pickup (1968–1976)
- Mitsubishi Colt 1200 (A23) (1968–1970)
- Mitsubishi Colt 1100F (1968–1971)
- Mitsubishi Delica (1968–1979)
- Nissan Laurel C30 (1968–1972)
- Prince Homer T641 (1968–1972)
- Toyota Dyna U10 (1968–1977)
- Toyota Hilux N10 (1968–1972)
- Toyota Corona Mark II T60/T70 (1968–1972)
- Toyota Corona Mark II T60/T70 coupé utility (1968–1974)
- Toyota Corolla Sprinter KE15 (1968–1969)

== 1969 ==
- Daihatsu Consorte (1969–1977)
- Hino Ranger (1969–1980)
- Honda 1300 (1969–1973)
- Mazda Luce R130 (1969–1972)
- Mazda Porter Cab LECA53 (1969–1976)
- Mitsubishi Galant (A50) (1969–1973)
- Mitsubishi Minica sedan (1969–1973)
- Mitsubishi Minica van (1969–1981)
- Nissan Skyline GT-R (KPGC10) (1969–1972)
- Subaru R-2 (1969–1972)
- Suzuki Carry L40 (1969–1972)
- Toyota Coaster (1969–1981)
- Toyota Publica P30 (1969–1978)

== 1970 ==
- Daihatsu Fellow Max (1970–1976)
- Datsun 240Z (1970–1973)
- Datsun Sunny B110 (1970–1973)
- Honda TNIII (1970–1972)
- Honda Vamos (1970–1973)
- Honda Z (1970–1974)
- Mazda Capella (RX-2) (1970–1978)
- Mazda Porter Cab (1970–1973)
- Mitsubishi Galant GTO (1970–1977)
- Nissan Cherry E10 (1970–1977)
- Nissan Junior 140 (1970–1973)
- Subaru FF-1 Star (1970–1973)
- Suzuki Sting Ray Fronte LC10W (1970–1971)
- Suzuki Jimny LJ10-SJ20 (1970–1981)
- Toyota Carina A10/A30 (1970–1977)
- Toyota Celica A20/A30 (1970–1977)
- Toyota Corolla (E20) coupe/sedan (1970–1974)
- Toyota Corolla (E20) wagon/van (1970–1978)
- Toyota Corona T80/T90 (1970–1973)
- Toyota LiteAce M10 (1970–1979)
- Toyota Sprinter Trueno TE27 (1970–1973)

== 1971 ==
- Daihatsu Hijet S38/S40 (1971–1981)
- Datsun Sunny Truck B120 (1971–1978)
- Datsun Bluebird 610 (1971–1976)
- Honda Life (1971–1974)
- Mazda Savanna RX-3 SI (1971–1973)
- Mazda Titan (1971–1980)
- Mitsubishi Galant FTO (1971–1975)
- Mitsubishi Minica Skipper (1971–1974)
- Nissan Cedric 230 (1971–1975)
- Nissan Gloria 230 (1971–1975)
- Subaru FF-1 1300G (1971–1972)
- Subaru Leone (1971–1981)
- Suzuki Fronte Coupé LC10W (1971–1976)
- Toyota Crown S60/S70 Model (1971–1974)
- Toyota ToyoAce (1971–1979)

== 1972 ==
- Datsun 620 (1972–1979)
- Datsun Skyline C110 (1972–1977)
- Honda Civic (1972–1979)
- Honda Life step van/pick-up (1972–1974)
- Honda TN-V (1972–1974)
- Isuzu BU (1972–1980)
- Isuzu Faster (1972–1980)
- Mazda Chantez (1972–1976)
- Mazda Luce LA2/LA3 sedan (1972–1977)
- Mazda Luce LA2/LA3 coupe (1972–1978)
- Mitsubishi Minica (1972–1977)
- Mitsubishi Minicab W T131 (1972–1976)
- Nissan Laurel C130 (1972–1977)
- Prince T20 Homer (1972–1976)
- Subaru Rex (K21) (1972–1981)
- Suzuki Carry L50/L60 (1972–1976)
- Toyota Hilux N20 (1972–1978)
- Toyota Corona Mark II X10/X20 (1972–1976)

== 1973 ==
- Datsun Sunny B210 (1973–1977)
- Datsun Violet 710 (1973–1977)
- Honda 145 (1973–1974)
- Isuzu Statesman de Ville (1973–1976)
- Mazda 929 LA2 (1973–1976)
- Mazda Familia Presto (1973–1977)
- Mazda Luce LA2/LA3 Wagon (1973–1979)
- Mazda Savanna RX-3 SII (1973–1978)
- Mitsubishi Galant (A11 Series) (1973–1976)
- Mitsubishi Lancer (A70) sedan (1973–1979)
- Mitsubishi Lancer (A70) van (1973–1985)
- Mitsubishi Type 73 light truck (1973–1997)
- Nissan Caravan (1973–1980)
- Nissan President H250 (1973–1989)
- Nissan Skyline GT-R (KPGC110) (1973)
- Subaru Sambar (third generation) (1973–1982)
- Toyota Corona T100/T200/T300 (1973–1979)
- Toyota Starlet P40/P50 (1973–1978)
- Toyota Type 73 medium truck (1973–1995)

== 1974 ==
- Daihatsu Charmant (1974–1981)
- Daihatsu Taft (1974–1984)
- Datsun 260Z (1974–1978)
- Isuzu Gemini (1974–1987)
- Mazda Parkway (1974–1977)
- Nissan Cherry F10 (1974–1978)
- Nissan Junior 141 (1974–1980)
- Toyota Corolla (E30) (1974–1981)
- Toyota Crown S80/S90/S100 Model (1974–1979)
- Toyota Sprinter sedan KE65 (1974–1978)

== 1975 ==
- Datsun 280Z (1975–1978)
- Honda TN7 (1975–1977)
- Mazda Cosmo CD (1975–1981)
- Mazda Roadpacer AP (1975–1977)
- Mitsubishi Lancer (A70) Celeste (1975–1981)
- Nissan Gloria 330 (1975–1979)
- Nissan Silvia (S10) (1975–1979)

== 1976 ==
- Daihatsu Max Cuore (1976–1980)
- Datsun Bluebird 810 (1976–1979)
- Honda Accord (1976–1981)
- Isuzu Journey-Q DBR370 (1976–1978)
- Mazda 929 LA3 (1976–1977)
- Mitsubishi Galant Σ (1976–1980)
- Mitsubishi Galant Lambda (1976–1984)
- Mitsubishi Minicab van L100 (1976–1984)
- Nissan Caball C340 (1976–1981)
- Nissan Cedric 330 (1976–1979)
- Prince F20 Homer (1976–1982)
- Suzuki Carry ST10/ST20/ST80 (1976–1979)
- Suzuki Fronte 7-S (1976–1979)
- Toyota LiteAce R10 van/wagon (1976–1982)
- Toyota Corona Mark II X30/X40 (1976–1980)

== 1977 ==
- Daihatsu Charade G10/G20 (1977–1983)
- Daihatsu Hijet S60 (1977–1981)
- Datsun Skyline C210 (1977–1981)
- Datsun Sunny B310 (1977–1981)
- Datsun Violet A10 (1977–1981)
- Honda Acty (1977–1988)
- Isuzu 117 Coupé 1800XG (1977–1981)
- Isuzu Florian Series II (1977–1983)
- Mazda Bongo (1977–1983)
- Mazda B1600/Proceed (1977–1985)
- Mazda Familia FA4 hatchback (1977–1980)
- Mazda Luce LA4 sedan (1977–1981)
- Mazda Porter Cab PC4D (1977–1989)
- Mitsubishi Minica (1977–1984)
- Nissan Laurel C230 (1977–1980)
- Suzuki Cervo SS20 (1977–1982)
- Toyota Carina A40 (1977–1981)
- Toyota Celica A40/A50 (1977–1981)
- Toyota Chaser X30/X40 (1977–1980)
- Toyota Dyna U20-50 (1977–1984)
- Toyota HiAce H11/H20/H30/H40 van (1977–1982)
- Toyota HiAce H11/H20/H30/H40 truck (1977–1985)

== 1978 ==
- Datsun Sunny Truck B121 (1978–1989)
- Datsun Vanette C20 (1978–1988)
- Honda Prelude (1978–1982)
- Mazda 929 LA4 (1978–1981)
- Mazda Capella CB (1978–1982)
- Mazda Familia FA4 Wagon (1978–1986)
- Mazda RX-7 Savanna SA S1 (1978–1980)
- Mitsubishi Mirage (1978–1983)
- Mitsubishi Triton (1978–1986)
- Nissan S130 (1978–1983)
- Datsun Pulsar N10/N11 (1978–1982)
- Subaru BRAT (1978–1994)
- Toyota Corona T130 (1978–1983)
- Toyota Hilux N30/N40 (1978–1983)
- Toyota Celica Supra (A40) (1978–1981)
- Toyota LiteAce R10 Truck (1978–1982)
- Toyota Starlet P60 (1978–1984)
- Toyota Tercel L10 (1978–1982)

== 1979 ==
- Datsun Bluebird 910 (1979–1983)
- Honda Civic (1979–1983)
- Isuzu Journey-Q K-DBR370 (1979–1983)
- Mazda Luce LA4 Wagon (1979–1988)
- Mitsubishi Delica (1979–1994)
- Mitsubishi Lancer (1979–1987)
- Nissan Cedric 430 (1979–1983)
- Nissan Gloria 430 (1979–1983)
- Nissan Silvia (S110) (1979–1981)
- Subaru Leone (1979–1984)
- Subaru Leone Hatchback (1979–1989)
- Suzuki Alto SS30/SS40 (1979–1984)
- Suzuki Carry ST30/ST40/ST90 (1979–1985)
- Suzuki Fronte SS30/SS40 (1979–1984)
- Toyota Corolla (E70) (1979–1987)
- Toyota Crown S110 Model (1979–1983)
- Toyota Dyna Y20-40 (1979–1985)
- Toyota LiteAce M20 van/wagon (1979–1985)
- Toyota LiteAce M20 truck (1979–1985)
- Toyota Sprinter sedan E70 (1979–1982)
- Toyota Stout RK110/111, YK110 (1979–1989)
- Toyota ToyoAce (1979–1985)

== 1980 ==
- Daihatsu Mira L55/L60 (1980–1985)
- Datsun 720 (1980–1986)
- Datsun 810 (G910) (1980–1981)
- Hino Ranger (1980–1989)
- Honda Ballade (1980–1983)
- Honda Quint (1980–1985)
- Isuzu C (1980–1984)
- Isuzu Faster (1980–1988)
- Isuzu Fargo (1980–1985)
- Isuzu Piazza JR120/130 (1980–1990)
- Mazda Familia BD (1980–1985)
- Mazda Titan (1980–1989)
- Mitsubishi Galant Σ turbo (1980–1987)
- Nissan Caravan (1980–1986)
- Nissan Laurel C31 (1980–1984)
- Nissan Leopard F30 (1980–1986)
- Nissan Patrol 160 (1980–1987)
- Toyota Blizzard LD10 (1980–1984)
- Toyota Celica Camry (1980–1982)
- Toyota Chaser X50/X60 (1980–1984)
- Toyota Land Cruiser J100 (1980–1989)
- Toyota Corona Mark II X60 (1980–1984)
- Toyota Cresta X50/X60 (1980–1984)

== 1981 ==
- Daihatsu Charmant (1981–1987)
- Daihatsu Hijet S65/S70 (1981–1986)
- Datsun Maxima (G910) (1981–1983)
- Hino Super Dolphin (1981–1992)
- Honda Accord (1981–1985)
- Honda City (1981–1986)
- Honda Vigor (1981–1985)
- Isuzu Trooper (1981–1991)
- Mazda Cosmo HB (1981–1989)
- Mazda Luce HB (1981–1986)
- Mazda RX-7 Savanna FB S2 (1981–1983)
- Nissan Atlas H40 (1981–1990)
- Nissan Gazelle XE-II Turbo Hatchback (S110) (1981–1983)
- Nissan Skyline R30 (1981–1985)
- Nissan Sunny B11 (1981–1985)
- Subaru Rex (second generation) (1981–1986)
- Suzuki CV1 (1981–1985)
- Suzuki Jimny SJ/J (1981–1998)
- Toyota Carina A60 (1981–1988)
- Toyota Celica A60 (1981–1985)
- Toyota Soarer Z10 (1981–1985)
- Toyota Celica Supra (A60) (1981–1986)

== 1982 ==
- Honda City Turbo (1982–1986)
- Honda Prelude (1982–1987)
- Mazda 929 HB (1982–1986)
- Mazda Capella GC (1982–1987)
- Mitsubishi Cordia (1982–1990)
- Mitsubishi Pajero (L040) (1982–1991)
- Mitsubishi Starion GSR-I/GSR-II/GSR-III/GSR-X (1982–1984)
- Mitsubishi Starion GX (1982–1983)
- Mitsubishi Tredia (1982–1990)
- Nissan AD van VB11 (1982–1990)
- Nissan Atlas F22 (1982–1991)
- Nissan EXA N12 (1982–1986)
- Nissan Micra K10 (1982–1992)
- Nissan Prairie M10 (1982–1988)
- Nissan Pulsar N12 (1982–1986)
- Nissan Violet T11 (1982–1986)
- Subaru Sambar (fourth generation) (1982–1990)
- Suzuki Cervo SS40 (1982–1988)
- Toyota Coaster (1982–1992)
- Toyota Corona T140 (1982–1987)
- Toyota Cresta Super Lucent Twin Cam (1982–1984)
- Toyota HiAce H50/H60/H70 (1982–1989)
- Toyota LiteAce R20/R30 (1982–1991)
- Toyota Tercel L20 (1982–1988)

== 1983 ==
- Daihatsu Charade G11 (1983–1987)
- Honda Ballade (1983–1986)
- Honda Civic (1983–1987)
- Honda Civic Shuttle (1983–1986)
- Isuzu Aska (1983–1989)
- Mazda Bongo (1983–1999)
- Mazda Bongo Brawny (1983–1999)
- Mitsubishi Chariot (1983–1991)
- Mitsubishi Galant (1983–1989)
- Mitsubishi Mirage hatchback/sedan (1983–1991)
- Nissan 300ZX (Z31) (1983–1989)
- Nissan 240RS (BS110) (1983–1985)
- Nissan Bluebird U11 (1983–1987)
- Nissan Cedric Y30 (1983–1987)
- Nissan Gloria Y30 (1983–1987)
- Nissan Maxima (G910) (1983–1984)
- Nissan Silvia (S12) (1983–1988)
- Subaru Sumo (1983–1998)
- Suzuki Cultus SA (1983–1988)
- Suzuki Mighty Boy (1983–1988)
- Toyota 4Runner N60 (1983–1989)
- Toyota AE85 (1983–1987)
- Toyota AE86 (1983–1987)
- Toyota Camry V10 (1983–1986)
- Toyota Corolla (E80) (1983–1987)
- Toyota Corona T150 (1983–1987)
- Toyota Crown S120 Model (1983–1987)
- Toyota Hilux N50/N60/N70 (1983–1988)

== 1984 ==
- Daihatsu Rugger (1984–1992)
- Honda Civic Si (1984–1987)
- Honda CR-X (1984–1987)
- Isuzu Cubic P-LV214/218/314/318 (1984–1989)
- Isuzu Journey-K P-LR212/311/312 (1984–1989)
- Isuzu Journey-Q P-MR112F (1984–1985)
- Mazda RX-7 Savanna FB S3 (1984–1985)
- Mitsubishi Minica (1984–1989)
- Mitsubishi Minicab (1984–1991)
- Nissan 300C (1984–1987)
- Nissan Bluebird U11 Wagon (1984–1990)
- Nissan Laurel C32 (1984–1989)
- Nissan Maxima PU11 (1984–1988)
- Subaru Justy (1984–1994)
- Subaru Leone (1984–1994)
- Suzuki Alto CA71 (1984–1988)
- Suzuki Fronte CB71 (1984–1988)
- Toyota Blizzard LD20 (1984–1990)
- Toyota Carina T150 (1984–1988)
- Toyota Chaser X70 (1984–1988)
- Toyota Cresta X70 (1984–1984)
- Toyota Dyna U60-90 (1984–1994)
- Toyota Land Cruiser (J70) (1984–1999)
- Toyota Land Cruiser Prado J70 (1984–1990)
- Toyota Mark II X60 (1984–1988)
- Toyota Mark II X60 Wagon (1984–1997)
- Toyota MR2 W10 (1984–1989)
- Toyota Starlet P70 (1984–1989)

== 1985 ==
- Daihatsu Mira L70 (1985–1990)
- Honda Accord (1985–1989)
- Honda Integra (1985–1989)
- Honda Legend (1985–1990)
- Honda Today (1985–1990)
- Isuzu Gemini (1985–1990)
- Mazda B2200/Proceed (1985–1998)
- Mazda Familia BF (1985–1989)
- Mazda RX-7 Savanna FC S4 (1985–1988)
- Mitsubishi Magna sedan (1985–1991)
- Mitsubishi Mirage wagon (1985–1991)
- Mitsubishi Starion GSR-II/GSR-III/GSR-X/GSR-V (1985–1986)
- Nissan Skyline R31 (1985–1990)
- Nissan Sunny B12 (1985–1990)
- Nissan Vanette C22 (1985–1994)
- Subaru XT (1985–1988)
- Suzuki Carry DA/DB71/DA81 (1985–1991)
- Toyota Carina ED ST160 (1985–1989)
- Toyota Celica T160 (1985–1989)
- Toyota Corona T160 (1985–1989)
- Toyota Dyna Y50-60 (1985–1995)
- Toyota HiAce H80/H90 (1985–1995)
- Toyota LiteAce M30/M40/M50/M60/M70/M80 (1985–1991)
- Toyota ToyoAce (1985–1995)

== 1986 ==
- Daihatsu Hijet S80/S82 (1986–1994)
- Daihatsu Leeza (1986–1990)
- Nissan Datsun truck (1986–1997)
- Honda City (1986–1994)
- Honda Vigor (1986–1989)
- Isuzu Geminett (1986–1988)
- Isuzu Super Cruiser P-LV719 (1986–1989)
- Isuzu Journey-Q P-MR112D (1986–1989)
- Mazda 121 (1986–1990)
- Mazda 929 HC (1986–1991)
- Mazda Luce HC (1986–1991)
- Mitsubishi Debonair (S10 Series) (1986–1992)
- Mitsubishi Delica (1986–1994)
- Mitsubishi Starion GSR-V (1986–1987)
- Mitsubishi Triton (1986–1996)
- Nissan Bluebird T Series (1986–1990)
- Nissan Caravan (1986–2001)
- Nissan EXA N13 (1986–1990)
- Nissan Leopard F31 (1986–1992)
- Nissan Pathfinder WD21 (1986–1995)
- Nissan Pulsar N13 (1986–1990)
- Nissan Violet T12 (1986–1990)
- Subaru Rex (KG/KN) (1986–1992)
- Toyota Camry V20 (1986–1991)
- Toyota LiteAce M30/M40/M50/M60/M70/M80 Truck (1986–2007)
- Toyota MR2 W10 Supercharged (1986–1989)
- Toyota Soarer Z20 (1986–1991)
- Toyota Supra (A70) (1986–1993)
- Toyota Tercel L30 (1986–1990)

== 1987 ==
- Daihatsu Charade G100/G112 (1987–1993)
- Honda Civic (1987–1991)
- Honda Civic Shuttle (1987–1996)
- Honda Prelude (1987–1991)
- Mazda Capella GD (1987–1991)
- Mazda Étude (1987–1989)
- Mazda MX-6 (1987–1992)
- Mitsubishi Galant E3 Series (1987–1993)
- Mitsubishi Galant VR-4 (1987–1992)
- Mitsubishi Magna wagon (1987–1992)
- Mitsubishi Mirage hatchback/sedan (1987–1995)
- Mitsubishi Mirage Liftback (1988–1996)
- Mitsubishi Precis (1987–1989)
- Mitsubishi Starion GSR-VR (1987–1989)
- Nissan Be-1 (1987–1988)
- Nissan Bluebird U12 (1987–1992)
- Nissan Cedric Y31 hardtop (1987–1991)
- Nissan Cedric Y31 sedan (1987–2015)
- Nissan Gloria Y31 hardtop (1987–1991)
- Nissan Gloria Y31 sedan (1987–2014)
- Nissan Patrol Y60 (1987–1993)
- Nissan Skyline R31 NISMO GTS-R (1985–1990)
- Toyota Corolla (E90) (1987–1992)
- Toyota Corona T160 (1987–1992)
- Toyota Crown S130 hardtop (1987–1991)
- Toyota Crown S130 sedan (1987–1995)
- Toyota Crown S130 wagon (1987–1999)
- Toyota Sprinter MX sedan E90 (1987–1990)
- Toyota Sprinter Carib AE95 (1987–1990)
- Toyota Sprinter Cielo Saloon AE91 (1987–1990)
- Toyota Sprinter Trueno GT-Z AE92 (1987–1990)

== 1988 ==
- Honda Acty (1988–1999)
- Honda Civic Si (1988–1991)
- Honda Concerto (1988–1994)
- Honda CR-X (1988–1991)
- Isuzu Faster (1988–2002)
- Isuzu Rodeo (1988–1994)
- Mazda Capella GV van (1988–1999)
- Mazda Capella GV wagon (1988–1997)
- Mazda MPV LV (1988–1999)
- Mazda Persona (1988–1992)
- Mitsubishi Lancer (1988–2000)
- Nissan Cefiro A31 (1988–1994)
- Nissan Cima Y31 (1988–1991)
- Nissan Maxima J30 (1988–1994)
- Nissan Prairie M11 (1988–1998)
- Subaru XT6 (1988–1991)
- Suzuki Alto CL11 (1988–1990)
- Suzuki Cervo CG72V/CH72V (1988–1990)
- Suzuki Cultus SF (1988–1995)
- Suzuki Fronte CN11S (1988–1989)
- Suzuki Vitara ET/TA (1988–1998)
- Toyota Carina T170 (1988–1992)
- Toyota Cresta X80 (1988–1992)
- Toyota Hilux N80/N90/N100/N110 (1988–1997)
- Toyota Mark II X80 (1988–1996)

== 1989 ==
- Autozam Carol AA5XA (1989–1990)
- Autozam Scrum (1989–1999)
- Daihatsu Applause (1989–1991)
- Daihatsu Rocky (1989–1998)
- Hino Ranger (1989–2002)
- Honda Accord (1989–1993)
- Honda Ascot (1989–1993)
- Honda Inspire (1989–1995)
- Honda Vigor (1989–1995)
- Isuzu MU (1989–1998)
- Mazda Titan (1989–2000)
- Mitsubishi Minica (1989–1993)
- Isuzu Geminett II (1989–1993)
- Lexus ES 250 (1989–1991)
- Lexus LS 400 (1989–1994)
- Mazda Familia Astina (1989–1994)
- Mazda Familia BG (1989–1994)
- Mazda MX-5 NA (1989–1997)
- Mazda RX-7 Savanna FC S5 (1989–1991)
- Mitsubishi Galant AMG (1989)
- Nissan 180SX Type I (1989–1993)
- Nissan 240SX (S13) (1989–1994)
- Nissan 300ZX (Z32) (1989–2000)
- Nissan Laurel C33 (1989–1993)
- Nissan Micra Super Turbo (EK10GFR/GAR) (1989)
- Nissan Pao (1989–1991)
- Nissan S-Cargo (1989–1992)
- Nissan Silvia (S13) (1989–1994)
- Nissan Skyline GT-R (R32) (1989–1994)
- Nissan Violet U12 (1989–1992)
- Subaru Legacy BC/BJ/BF (1989–1994)
- Toyota 4Runner N120/N130 (1989–1995)
- Toyota Carina ED ST180 (1989–1993)
- Toyota Celica T180 (1989–1993)
- Toyota Chaser X80 (1989–1992)
- Toyota Corona EXiV ST180 (1989–1993)
- Toyota HiAce (1989–2004)
- Toyota MR2 W20 (1989–1999)
- Toyota Starlet P80 (1989–1995)

== 1990 ==
- Daihatsu Leeza (1990–1993)
- Daihatsu Mira L200 (1990–1994)
- Autozam Carol AA6XA (1990–1994)
- Autozam Revue (1990–1998)
- Honda Integra (1990–1993)
- Honda Legend (1990–1995)
- Honda Today (1990–1993)
- Honda NSX (1990–1997)
- Isuzu Aska (1990–1993)
- Isuzu Cubic U-LV218/224/318/324 (1990–1994)
- Isuzu Gemini (1990–1993)
- Isuzu Journey-K U-LR312/332 (1990–1994)
- Isuzu Journey-Q U-MR132D (1990)
- Isuzu Piazza (1990–1993)
- Isuzu Super Cruiser U-LV771 (1990–1994)
- Geo Storm (1990–1993)
- Mazda 121 (1990–1998)
- Mazda Cosmo JC (1990–1996)
- Mitsubishi Diamante (1990–1996)
- Mitsubishi GTO Z16A (1990–1993)
- Mitsubishi Minica Toppo (1990–2004)
- Mitsubishi Precis (1990–1994)
- Nissan AD Y10 (1990–1998)
- Nissan Avenir W10 (1990–1997)
- Nissan Figaro (1990)
- Nissan NX (1990–1993)
- Nissan Presea R10 (1990–1995)
- Nissan President HG50 (1990–2002)
- Nissan Pulsar N14 (1990–1995)
- Nissan Skyline GT-R NISMO (R32) (1990)
- Nissan Sunny B13 (1990–1993)
- Subaru Bighorn (1990–1991)
- Subaru Sambar (fifth generation) (1990–1999)
- Suzuki Alto CL/CM/CN/CP21 (1990–1991)
- Suzuki Cervo CN/CP (1990–1998)
- Toyota Camry V30 (1990–1994)
- Toyota Land Cruiser J80 (1990–1997)
- Toyota Land Cruiser Prado J70 (1990–1996)
- Toyota Previa XR10/XR20 (1990–1999)
- Toyota Sera (1990–1995)
- Toyota Starlet P80 GT Turbo (1990–1995)
- Toyota Tercel L40 (1990–1994)

== 1991 ==
- Honda Beat (1991–1996)
- Honda Civic (1991–1995)
- Honda Prelude (1991–1996)
- ɛ̃fini MPV (1991–1997)
- ɛ̃fini MS6 (1991–1994)
- ɛ̃fini MS9 (1991–1993)
- Isuzu Journey-Q U-GR432F (1991–1995)
- Isuzu Trooper (1991–2002)
- Lexus ES 300 (1991–1996)
- Lexus SC 300 (1991–1992)
- Mazda 929 HD (1991–1995)
- Mazda Capella GE (1991–1997)
- Mazda MX-3 (1991–1998)
- Mazda MX-6 (1991–1997)
- Mazda Sentia HD (1991–1996)
- Mitsubishi Chariot (1991–1997)
- Mitsubishi 3000GT Z11A (1991–1999)
- Mitsubishi Magna sedan (1991–1996)
- Mitsubishi Minicab (1991–1998)
- Mitsubishi Mirage (1991–1995)
- Mitsubishi Pajero (V20) (1991–1999)
- Mitsubishi RVR (1991–1999)
- Nissan 180SX Type II (1991–1995)
- Nissan Atlas H41 (1991–1994)
- Nissan Bluebird U13 (1991–1997)
- Nissan Cedric Y32 (1991–1995)
- Nissan Cima Y32 (1991–1996)
- Nissan Gloria Y32 (1991–1995)
- Nissan Serena MkI C23 (1991–1999)
- Subaru Alcyone SVX (1991–1996)
- Suzuki Alto Hustle (1991–1993)
- Suzuki Alto Works RS-R (1991–1994)
- Suzuki Alto Works RS-X (1991–1994)
- Suzuki Cappuccino (1991–1997)
- Suzuki Carry (1991–1999)
- Toyota Aristo S140 (1991–1997)
- Toyota Corolla (E100) (1991–1998)
- Toyota Corolla (E100) Wagon (1991–2002)
- Toyota Crown S140 Model (1991–1995)
- Toyota Paeso EL44 (1991–1995)
- Toyota Soarer Z30 (1991–2000)
- Toyota Sprinter Marino (1992–1998)

== 1992 ==
- Autozam AZ-1 (1992–1995)
- Autozam Clef (1992–1994)
- Daihatsu Applause (1992–1996)
- Daihatsu Opti L300S (1992–1998)
- Daihatsu Rugger (1992–2002)
- Hino Super Dolphin Profia (1992–2003)
- Honda Ascot (1992–1996)
- Honda Civic Si (1992–1995)
- Honda CR-X del Sol (1992–1998)
- Honda Domani (1992–1997)
- Honda NSX-R (1992–1995)
- Isuzu Cubic U-LV870L One-Step (1992–1994)
- ɛ̃fini MS-8 (1992–1997)
- ɛ̃fini RX-7 (1992–1997)
- Lexus SC 400 (1992–2000)
- Mazda Millenia (1992–2002)
- Mazda RX-7 FD S6 (1992–1995)
- Mazda Xedos 6 (1992–1999)
- Mitsubishi Debonair (S20 Series) (1992–1998)
- Mitsubishi Galant E5 Series (1992–1998)
- Mitsubishi Galant VR-4 (1992–1996)
- Mitsubishi Lancer Evolution I (1992–1994)
- Mitsubishi Magna Wagon (1992–1997)
- Nissan Altima U13 (1992–1997)
- Nissan Atlas F23 (1992–2006)
- Nissan Leopard J Ferie Y32 (1992–1996)
- Nissan Micra K11 (1992–2003)
- Subaru Bighorn (1992–1993)
- Subaru Impreza GC8A (1992–1993)
- Subaru Vivio (1992–1998)
- Toyota Caldina T190 (1992–1997)
- Toyota Carina T190 (1992–1996)
- Toyota Chaser X90 (1992–1996)
- Toyota Corona T190 (1992–1996)
- Toyota Cresta X90 (1992–1996)
- Toyota LiteAce R20/R30 (1992–1996)
- Toyota Mark II X90 (1992–1996)

== 1993 ==
- Daihatsu Charade G200 (1993–2000)
- Honda Accord (1993–1997)
- Honda Ascot (1993–1997)
- Honda Crossroad (1993–1998)
- Honda Jazz (1993–1996)
- Honda Rafaga (1993–1997)
- Honda Today (1993–1998)
- Isuzu Gemini (1993–1996)
- Lexus GS 300 S140 (1993–1997)
- Mazda Familia van (1993–1998)
- Mazda Lantis (1993–1998)
- Mitsubishi Minica (1993–1998)
- Nissan Crew (1993–2009)
- Nissan Laurel C34 (1993–1997)
- Nissan Silvia (S14) (1993–2000)
- Nissan Sunny B14 (1993–1998)
- Subaru Impreza GC8B (1993–1994)
- Subaru Legacy BD/BG/BK (1993–1999)
- Subaru Outback (first generation) (1993–1999)
- Suzuki Super Carry (1993–1999)
- Suzuki Wagon R (1993–1997)
- Toyota Carina ED ST200 (1993–1998)
- Toyota Celica T200 (1993–1999)
- Toyota Coaster (1993–2016)
- Toyota Corona EXiV ST200 (1993–1998)
- Toyota Supra (A80) (1993–2002)

== 1994 ==
- Daihatsu Hijet S100/S110/S120/S130 (1994–1999)
- Daihatsu Mira L500 (1994–1998)
- Honda Horizon (1994–1999)
- Honda Integra (1994–2001)
- Honda Odyssey (1994–1999)
- Isuzu Aska (1994–1997)
- Lexus LS 400 (1994–2000)
- Mazda AZ-Wagon (1994–1997)
- Mazda Capella CG (1994–1997)
- Mazda Familia BH (1994–1998)
- Mitsubishi Delica (1994–2007)
- Mitsubishi FTO (1994–2000)
- Mitsubishi GTO Z15A (1994–1997)
- Mitsubishi L300 (1994–1998)
- Mitsubishi Lancer Evolution II (1994–1995)
- Nissan 180SX Type R (1994–1997)
- Nissan 180SX Type X (1994–1997)
- Nissan 240SX (S14) (1994–1998)
- Nissan Cefiro A32 sedan (1994–1998)
- Nissan Crew saloon (1994–2002)
- Nissan Lucino coupé (1994–1999)
- Nissan Maxima A32 (1994–1999)
- Nissan Rasheen (1994–2000)
- Nissan Silvia S14 270R (1994)
- Nissan Vanette S20 (1994–1999)
- Subaru Impreza GC8C (1994–1996)
- Suzuki Alto HA11 (1994–1998)
- Toyota Camry V40 (1994–1998)
- Toyota Curren (1994–1995)
- Toyota Estima Super Charger (1994–1998)
- Toyota Tercel L50 (1994–1999)
- Toyota RAV4 XA10 (1994–2000)

== 1995 ==
- Autozam Carol Mk III (1995–1998)
- Hino Liesse KC-RX4JFAA (1995–1999)
- Honda Civic (1995–2000)
- Honda CR-V RD1-RD3 (1995–2001)
- Honda Inspire (1995–1998)
- Honda Integra DC2 Type-R (1995–1998)
- Honda Legend (1995–2004)
- Honda NSX-T (1995–2001)
- Isuzu Cubic KC-LV280/380/880 (1995–2000)
- Isuzu Cubic NE-LV288 (1995–2000)
- Isuzu Cubic KC-LV880L One-Step (1995–2000)
- Isuzu Fargo (1995–2001)
- Isuzu Journey-K KC-LR233/333 (1995–1999)
- Isuzu Super Cruiser KC-LV781 (1995–1996)
- Mazda Bongo Friendee (1995–2005)
- Mazda Sentia HE (1995–1999)
- Mitsubishi Diamante (1995–2005)
- Mitsubishi Eclipse (1995–1999)
- Mitsubishi Lancer Evolution III (1995–1996)
- Mitsubishi Mirage (1995–2003)
- Mitsubishi Pajero Junior (1995–1998)
- Mitsubishi Pajero Mini (1995–1998)
- Nissan Atlas H40 (1995–2006)
- Nissan Avenir Salut GT Turbo (1995–1996)
- Nissan Cedric Y33 (1995–1999)
- Nissan Gloria Y33 (1995–1999)
- Nissan Lucino 3-door (1995–1999)
- Nissan Lucino 5-door (1995–2000)
- Nissan Pathfinder R50 (1995–2004)
- Nissan Presea R11 (1995–2000)
- Nissan Pulsar N15 (1995–2000)
- Nissan Skyline GT-R (R33) (1995–1998)
- Subaru Justy (1995–2003)
- Subaru Leone (1995–1998)
- Suzuki Cultus Crescent (1995–1998)
- Suzuki Jimny JA (1995–1998)
- Suzuki X-90 (1995–1997)
- Toyota 4Runner N180 (1995–2002)
- Toyota Avalon XX10 (1995–1999)
- Toyota Corolla (E110) (1995–2002)
- Toyota Crown S150 hardtop (1995–1999)
- Toyota Crown S150 sedan (1995–2001)
- Toyota Crown Comfort XS10 (1995–2017)
- Toyota Dyna U100/Y100 (1995–2002)
- Toyota Ipsum (1995–2001)
- Toyota Mega Cruiser (1995–2002)
- Toyota Paeso EL54 (1995–1999)
- Toyota Sprinter Carib AE110 (1995–2000)
- Toyota ToyoAce (1995–1999)
- Toyota Type 73 medium truck (1995–present)

== 1996 ==
- Daihatsu Midget (1996–2002)
- Daihatsu Pyzar (1996–2002)
- Honda City (1996–2002)
- Honda Civic Si (1996–2000)
- Honda Logo (1996–2001)
- Honda Orthia (1996–2002)
- Honda Partner (1996–2005)
- Honda Prelude (1996–2001)
- Honda S-MX (1996–2002)
- Honda Stepwgn (1996–2001)
- Infiniti QX4 (1996–2002)
- Isuzu Journey-Q KC-GR433F (1996–1998)
- Isuzu Oasis (1996–1999)
- Isuzu Vertex (1996–2001)
- Lexus LX J80 (1996–1997)
- Mazda 929 HE (1996–1997)
- Mazda Demio (1996–2002)
- Mazda RX-7 FD S7 (1996–1998)
- Mitsubishi Galant VR-4 (1996–2003)
- Mitsubishi Lancer Evolution IV GSR (1996–1998)
- Mitsubishi Lancer Evolution IV RS (1996–1998)
- Mitsubishi Legnum (1996–2006)
- Mitsubishi Magna sedan (1996–2005)
- Mitsubishi Type 73 light truck (1996–present)
- Nissan 180SX Type S (1996–1998)
- Nissan Bluebird U14 (1996–2001)
- Nissan Cima Y33 (1996–2001)
- Nissan Leopard Y33 (1996–1999)
- Nissan Stagea 260RS Autech edition (1996–2001)
- Nissan Stagea WC34 Series 1 (1996–1998)
- Subaru Impreza GC8D (1996–1997)
- Toyota Carina T210 (1996–2001)
- Toyota Chaser X100 (1996–2001)
- Toyota Classic (1996)
- Toyota Corona T210 (1996–2001)
- Toyota Cresta X100 (1996–2001)
- Toyota Curren (1996–1998)
- Toyota Land Cruiser Prado J90 (1996–2002)
- Toyota LiteAce R40/R50 (1996–2007)
- Toyota Mark II X100 (1996–2000)
- Toyota Starlet P90 (1996–1999)

== 1997 ==
- Daihatsu Applause (1997–2000)
- Daihatsu Terios J100 (1997–2006)
- Daihatsu Terios Kid J100 (1997–2012)
- Honda Civic Type R (1997–2000)
- Honda Domani (1997–2000)
- Honda EV Plus (1997–1999)
- Honda Life (1997–1998)
- Honda NSX-S (1997–2002)
- Honda NSX-S-Zero (1997–2002)
- Honda Torneo (1997–2001)
- Honda Torneo SiR (1997–2001)
- Honda Torneo SiR-T (1997–2000)
- Isuzu Filly (1997–2002)
- Isuzu Gemini (1997–2000)
- Isuzu Vehicross (1997–2001)
- Lexus ES 300 (1997–2001)
- Lexus GS 300 S160 (1997–2004)
- Mazda Capella GF/GW (1997–2002)
- Mitsubishi Chariot (1997–2003)
- Mitsubishi GTO Z15AM (1997–2000)
- Mitsubishi Magna Wagon (1997–2005)
- Mitsubishi RVR (1997–2002)
- Nissan Altima L30 (1997–2001)
- Nissan Cefiro A32 Wagon (1997–2000)
- Nissan Elgrand E50 (1997–2002)
- Nissan Laurel C35 (1997–2002)
- Nissan Patrol Y61 (1997–2000)
- Nissan R'nessa (1997–2001)
- NISMO 400R (1997)
- Subaru Forester SF (1997–2002)
- Subaru Impreza GC8E (1997–1998)
- Toyota Aristo S160 (1997–2005)
- Toyota Caldina T210 (1997–2002)
- Toyota Cami J100 (1997–2006)
- Toyota Century G50 (1997–2016)
- Toyota Corolla Verso E110 (1997–2001)
- Toyota Hilux N140/N150/N160/N170 (1997–2005)
- Toyota Prius NHW10 (1997–2000)

== 1998 ==
- Daihatsu Mira L700 (1998–2002)
- Daihatsu Opti (1998–2002)
- Daihatsu Storia (1998–2004)
- Honda Accord (1998–2002)
- Honda Capa (1998–2002)
- Honda HR-V (1998–2006)
- Honda Inspire (1998–2003)
- Honda Life (1998–2003)
- Honda Z (1998–2002)
- Isuzu Aska (1998–2002)
- Isuzu Cubic KC-LV832 One-Step (1998–2000)
- Isuzu MU (1998–2004)
- Lexus GS 300 (1998–2004)
- Lexus LX J100 (1998–2007)
- Mazda AZ-Offroad (1998–2014)
- Mazda AZ-Wagon (1998–2002)
- Mazda B2600/Proceed (1998–2006)
- Mazda Familia BJ (1998–2003)
- Mazda MX-5 (NB) (1998–2005)
- Mazda RX-7 FD S8 Spirit R (1998–2002)
- Mitsubishi Aspire GDI (1998–2003)
- Mitsubishi Lancer Evolution V GSR (1998–1999)
- Mitsubishi Lancer Evolution V RS (1998–1999)
- Mitsubishi Minica (1998–2007)
- Mitsubishi Minicab (1998–2013)
- Mitsubishi Mirage Dingo (1998–2003)
- Mitsubishi Pajero iO (1998–2007)
- Nissan Altra (1998–2002)
- Nissan Avenir W11 (1998–2005)
- Nissan Cefiro A33 (1998–2004)
- Nissan Cube Z10 (1998–2002)
- Nissan Prairie M12 (1998–2004)
- Nissan Presage U30 (1998–2003)
- Nissan Sileighty (1998)
- Nissan Stagea WC34 Series 2 (1998–2001)
- Nissan Sunny B15 (1998–2006)
- Subaru Impreza 22B STI (GC8E) (1998)
- Subaru Impreza GC8F (1998–1999)
- Subaru Legacy BE/BH/BT (1998–2004)
- Subaru Pleo RA/RV (1998–2009)
- Suzuki Alto HA12 (1998–2004)
- Suzuki Cultus (1998–2002)
- Suzuki Jimny JB (1998–2018)
- Suzuki Kei (1998–2009)
- Suzuki Vitara FT/GT (1998–2005)
- Suzuki Wagon R (1998–2003)
- Suzuki XL-7 (1998–2006)
- Toyota Altezza XE10 (1998–2005)
- Toyota Camry V50 (1998–2003)
- Toyota Duet (1998–2001)
- Toyota Land Cruiser J100 (1998–2007)
- Toyota Progrès (1998–2007)

== 1999 ==
- Daihatsu Hijet S200/S210 (1999–2004)
- Daihatsu Mira Gino (1999–2004)
- Hino Dutro (1999–2011)
- Honda Acty (1999–2009)
- Honda Acty van (1999–present)
- Honda Avancier station wagon (1999–2003)
- Honda HR-V (1999–2006)
- Honda Insight ZE1 (1999–2006)
- Honda Odyssey (1999–2003)
- Honda S2000 (AP1) (1999–2003)
- Honda Vamos (1999–present)
- Isuzu Journey-Q KK-GR433F (1999–2001)
- Lexus IS XE10 (1999–2005)
- Lexus RX XU10 (1999–2003)
- Mazda Bongo SK/SL (1999–2018)
- Mazda Bongo Brawny SK (1999–2010)
- Mazda Carol Mk IV (1999–2000)
- Mazda Familia van (1999–2006)
- Mazda Laputa (1999–2006)
- Mazda MPV LW (1999–2006)
- Mazda MX-5 10th Anniversary (1999)
- Mazda Premacy (1999–2004)
- Mitsubishi Dignity Series S43A (1999–2001)
- Mitsubishi Lancer Evolution VI GSR (1999–2001)
- Mitsubishi Lancer Evolution VI RS (1999–2001)
- Mitsubishi Lancer Evolution VI Tommi Mäkinen Edition GSR (1999–2001)
- Mitsubishi Lancer Evolution VI Tommi Mäkinen Edition RS (1999–2001)
- Mitsubishi Pajero (V60) (1999–2006)
- Mitsubishi Pajero Mini (1999–2012)
- Mitsubishi Pistachio (1999)
- Mitsubishi Proudia Series S32A (1999–2001)
- Mitsubishi Town Box (1999–2011)
- Nissan AD van Y11 (1999–2005)
- Nissan Bassara (1999–2003)
- Nissan Cedric Y34 (1999–2004)
- Nissan Gloria Y34 (1999–2004)
- Nissan Hypermini (1999–2001)
- Nissan Maxima A33 (1999–2002)
- Nissan Serena MkII C24 (1999–2005)
- Nissan Silvia (S15) (1999–2002)
- Nissan Skyline GT-R (R34) (1999–2002)
- Nissan Vanette S21 (1999–2011)
- Subaru Impreza GC8G (1999–2000)
- Subaru Outback (second generation) (1999–2004)
- Subaru Leone (1999–2001)
- Subaru Sambar (sixth generation) (1999–2012)
- Suzuki Carry (1999–2013)
- Suzuki Every Plus (1999–2005)
- Toyota Celica T230 (1999–2006)
- Toyota Crown S170 sedan (1999–2003)
- Toyota Crown S170 wagon (1999–2007)
- Toyota Land Cruiser (J70) (1999–2006)
- Toyota MR2 W30 (1999–2007)
- Toyota Platz (1999–2005)
- Toyota ToyoAce (1999–2011)
- Toyota Vitz XP10 (1999–2005)
- Toyota Yaris Verso (1999–2005)

== 2000 ==
- Autozam Scrum Wagon (2000–2003)
- Daihatsu Max (2000–2005)
- Daihatsu Naked (2000–2004)
- Daihatsu YRV (2000–2005)
- Honda Civic (2000–2005)
- Honda Stream (2000–2006)
- Lexus LS 430 (2000–2006)
- Mazda Titan (2000–2004)
- Mazda Tribute (2000–2006)
- Mitsubishi Dion (2000–2005)
- Mitsubishi Lancer (2000–2007)
- Nissan Avenir GT4 (2000–2002)
- Subaru Impreza (second generation) (2000–2002)
- Suzuki Ignis HT51S/HT81S (2000–2006)
- Suzuki Swift HT51S/HT81S (2000–2006)
- Toyota Avalon XX20 (2000–2004)
- Toyota bB NCP3# (2000–2005)
- Toyota Corolla (E120) (2000–2007)
- Toyota Dyna U300/U400 (2000–2010)
- Toyota Highlander XU20 (2000–2007)
- Toyota Mark II X110 (2000–2004)
- Toyota Origin (2000–2001)
- Toyota Previa XR30/XR40 (2000–2005)
- Toyota Prius NHW11 (2000–2003)
- Toyota RAV4 XA20 (2000–2005)

== 2001 ==
- Hino Ranger (2001–present)
- Honda Civic Hybrid (2001–2005)
- Honda Civic Si (2001–2005)
- Honda Civic Type R (2001–2006)
- Honda CR-V RD4-RD9 (2001–2006)
- Honda Fit (2001–2008)
- Honda Mobilio (2001–2008)
- Honda Stepwgn (2001–2005)
- Lexus SC 430 (2001–2010)
- Mazda Carol Mk IV (2001–2003)
- Mitsubishi Airtrek (2001–2008)
- Mitsubishi eK (2001–present)
- Mitsubishi Lancer Evolution VII GSR (2001–2003)
- Mitsubishi Lancer Evolution VII GT-A (2001–2003)
- Mitsubishi Lancer Evolution VII RS (2001–2003)
- Mitsubishi Outlander (2003–2006)
- Nissan 350Z Coupé (2001–2007)
- Nissan Altima L31 (2001–2006)
- Nissan Caravan (2001–2012)
- Nissan Cima F50 (2001–2010)
- Nissan President PGF50 (2001–2010)
- Nissan Skyline V35 sedan (2001–2006)
- Nissan Stagea M35 series 1 (2001–2004)
- Suzuki Aerio (2001–2007)
- Suzuki MR Wagon (2001–2006)
- Toyota Brevis G10 (2001–2007)
- Toyota Corolla Verso E121 (2001–2007)
- Toyota Ipsum (2001–2009)
- Toyota Noah R60 (2002–2007)
- Toyota Soarer Z40 (2001–2005)
- Toyota Verossa (2001–2004)

== 2002 ==
- Daihatsu Copen (2002–2012)
- Daihatsu Mira L250/L260 (2002–2006)
- Daihatsu Move L150/L160 (2002–2006)
- Honda Accord (2002–2008)
- Honda City (2002–2008)
- Honda Integra (2002–2006)
- Honda Integra Type R (2002–2005)
- Honda Mobilio Spike (2002–2008)
- Honda NSX-R (2002–2005)
- Honda That's (2002–2006)
- Infiniti QX70 S50 (2002–2008)
- Isuzu Como (2002–2011)
- Lexus ES 300 (2002–2006)
- Mazda6 GG1 (2002–2008)
- Mazda Demio (2002–2007)
- Mazda Spiano (2002–2008)
- Mitsubishi Colt (Z30) (2002–2012)
- Nissan 350Z (2002–2009)
- Nissan Cube Z11 (2002–2008)
- Nissan Elgrand E51 (2002–2010)
- Nissan Micra K12 (2002–2010)
- Nissan Skyline V35 Coupe (2002–2007)
- Subaru Forester SG (2002–2008)
- Subaru Impreza (second generation) (2002–2005)
- Subaru Impreza WRX (2002–2007)
- Subaru Impreza S202 STi version (2002)
- Suzuki Lapin HE21S (2002–2008)
- Toyota 4Runner N210 (2002–2009)
- Toyota Alphard AH10 (2002–2008)
- Toyota Caldina T240 (2002–2007)
- Toyota ist XP60 (2002–2007)
- Toyota Land Cruiser Prado J120 (2002–2009)
- Toyota Mark II Blit (2002–2007)
- Toyota Probox (2002–2014)
- Toyota Succeed (2002–2013)

== 2003 ==
- Daihatsu Tanto (2003–2007)
- Hino Super Dolphin Profia (2003–present)
- Honda Inspire (2003–2007)
- Honda Life (2003–2008)
- Honda Odyssey (2003–2008)
- Isuzu Journey-J (2003–2011)
- Lexus GX J120 (2003–2009)
- Mazda3 BK (2003–2009)
- Mazda AZ-Wagon (2003–2007)
- Mazda RX-8 SE3P (2003–2008)
- Mitsubishi Grandis (2003–2011)
- Mitsubishi Lancer Evolution VIII GSR (2003–2005)
- Mitsubishi Lancer Evolution VIII RS 5-Speed (2003–2005)
- Mitsubishi Lancer Evolution VIII RS 6-Speed (2003–2005)
- Mitsubishi Lancer Evolution VIII MR GSR (2003–2005)
- Mitsubishi Lancer Evolution VIII MR RS 5-Speed (2003–2005)
- Mitsubishi Lancer Evolution VIII MR RS 6-Speed (2003–2005)
- Nissan 350Z Roadster (2003–2007)
- Nissan Clipper truck U71T (2003–2012)
- Nissan Clipper van U71V (2003–2012)
- Nissan Presage U31 (2003–2009)
- NISMO Z-Tune (2003–2005)
- Nissan Teana J31 (2003–2008)
- Scion xB (2003–2006)
- Subaru Legacy BL/BP (2003–2009)
- Subaru Outback (third generation) (2003–2009)
- Subaru R2 (2003–2010)
- Suzuki Ignis HR51S/HR81S (2003–2008)
- Suzuki Swift HR51S/HR81S (2003–2008)
- Suzuki Twin (2003–2005)
- Suzuki Wagon R (2003–2008)
- TRD Comfort GT-Z Supercharger (2003)
- Toyota Crown S180 Model (2003–2008)
- Toyota Prius XW20 (2003–2009)
- Toyota Sienta XP80 (2003–2010)

== 2004 ==
- Autozam Scrum Wagon (2004–present)
- Daihatsu Boon (2004–2010)
- Daihatsu Hijet S65/S70 (2004–present)
- Daihatsu Mira Gino (2004–2009)
- Hino 600 (2004–present)
- Honda Elysion (2004–2013)
- Honda FR-V (2004–2009)
- Honda Legend (2004–2012)
- Honda S2000 (AP2) (2004–2009)
- Hino Liesse PB-RX6JFAA (2004–2006)
- Lexus RX XU30 (2004–2009)
- Mazda Carol Mk V (2004–2009)
- Mazdaspeed MX-5 (1998–2005)
- Mazda Premacy (2004–2010)
- Mazda Titan (2004–2007)
- Mazda Verisa (2004–2015)
- Nissan Fuga Y50 (2004–2009)
- Nissan Lafesta B30 (2004–2012)
- Nissan Note E11 (2004–2011)
- Nissan Stagea M35 Series 2 (2004–2007)
- Nissan Tiida C11 (2004–2012)
- Subaru Justy (2004–2006)
- Suzuki Alto HA24 (2004–2009)
- Suzuki Swift ZA/ZC/ZD (2004–2010)
- Toyota HiAce H200 (2004–present)
- Toyota Mark X120 (2004–2009)

== 2005 ==
- Daihatsu Esse (2005–2011)
- Honda Airwave (2005–2010)
- Honda Civic (2005–2012)
- Honda Stepwgn (2005–2009)
- Lexus GS 350 (2005–2011)
- Lexus IS XE20 sedan (2005–2013)
- Mazda MX-5 (NC) (2005–2015)
- Mazdaspeed6 (2005–2007)
- Mitsubishi L200 (2005–2014)
- Mitsubishi Lancer Evolution IX GSR (2005–2007)
- Mitsubishi Lancer Evolution IX GT (2005–2007)
- Mitsubishi Lancer Evolution IX RS (2005–2007)
- Mitsubishi Lancer Evolution IX MR GSR (2005–2007)
- Mitsubishi Lancer Evolution IX MR RS (2005–2007)
- Mitsubishi Lancer Evolution IX MR Tuned by RALLIART (2005–2007)
- Nissan Serena MkIII C25 (2005–2010)
- Nissan Wingroad (2005–2017)
- Subaru Impreza (second generation) (2005–2007)
- Subaru R1 (2005–2010)
- Suzuki Swift Sport (ZC31S) (2005–2012)
- Suzuki Vitara JT (2005–present)
- Toyota Avalon XX30 (2005–2012)
- Toyota Belta (2005–2012)
- Toyota bB QNC2# (2005–2016)
- Toyota Ractis NCP100 (2005–2010)
- Toyota RAV4 XA30 (2005–2016)
- Toyota Vitz XP90 (2005–2011)

== 2006 ==
- Daihatsu Mira L275/L285 (2006–2011)
- Daihatsu Move L175/L185 (2006–2010)
- Daihatsu Be‣Go J200/F700 (2006–2016)
- Daihatsu Sonica (2006–2009)
- Honda Civic Hybrid (2006–2011)
- Honda Civic Si (2006–2011)
- Honda Civic Type R (2006–2011)
- Honda CR-V RE1-RE5/RE7 (2006–2011)
- Honda Partner (2006–2010)
- Honda Stream (2006–2014)
- Honda Zest (2006–2012)
- Lexus LS 460 (2006–2017)
- Mazda CX-7 (2006–2012)
- Mazda CX-9 (2006–2016)
- Mazda MPV LY (2006–2016)
- Mitsubishi i (2006–2013)
- Mitsubishi Outlander (2006–2012)
- Mitsubishi Pajero (V80) (2006–present)
- Nissan Altima L32A sedan (2006–2012)
- Nissan AD van Y12 (2006–present)
- Nissan Dualis J10 (2006–2013)
- Nissan Skyline V36 (2006–2014)
- Subaru Stella (2006–2010)
- Suzuki Cervo HG21S (2006–2009)
- Suzuki MR Wagon MF22S (2006–2011)
- Suzuki SX4 Hatchback (2006–2014)
- Toyota Auris E150 (2006–2012)
- Toyota Belta (2006-2012)
- Toyota Corolla (E140) (2006–2012)
- Toyota Previa XR50 Fujimatsu (2006–present)
- Toyota Previa XR50 Motomachi (2006–present)

== 2007 ==
- Daihatsu Tanto (2007–present)
- Honda Fit (2007–2014)
- Honda Inspire (2007–2012)
- Hino Liesse BDG-RX6JFBA (2007–2011)
- Lexus ES 350 (2007–2012)
- Lexus IS F XE20 (2007–2014)
- Mazda6 GH1 (2007–2012)
- Mazda Demio (2007–2014)
- Mazda Familia van (2007–2017)
- Mazda Titan (2007–2024)
- Mitsubishi Delica (2007–present)
- Mitsubishi Lancer (2007–2017)
- Mitsubishi Lancer Evolution X RS (2007–2016)
- Mitsubishi Lancer Evolution X GSR (2007–2016)
- Mitsubishi Lancer Evolution X GSR Tuned by RALLIART (2007–2016)
- Nissan Altima D32 Coupe (2007–2013)
- Nissan Atlas 10 (F24) (2007–present)
- Nissan Atlas 20 (H43) (2007–present)
- Nissan GT-R (2007–2010)
- Nissan Pino (2007–2010)
- Scion xB (2007–2015)
- Subaru Impreza (2007–2011)
- Subaru Impreza WRX (2007–2014)
- Subaru Justy (2007–2009)
- Suzuki Landy (2007–present)
- Suzuki SX4 sedan (2007–2014)
- Toyota Corolla Rumion (2007–2015)
- Toyota Highlander XU40 (2007–2013)
- Toyota ist XP110 (2007–2016)
- Toyota Land Cruiser J200 (2007–2021)
- Toyota Land Cruiser (J70) (2007–2015)
- Toyota Mark X ZiO (2007–2013)
- Toyota Noah R70 (2007–2013)
- Toyota Rush J200 (2007–2017)

== 2008 ==
- Honda Accord (2008–2015)
- Honda Accord Tourer CW (2008–2015)
- Honda City (2008–2013)
- Honda Clarity (2008–2014)
- Honda Crossroad (2008–2010)
- Honda Freed (2008–2016)
- Honda Life (2008–2014)
- Honda Odyssey (2008–2013)
- Infiniti FX (2008–2013)
- Lexus LX J200 (2008–2021)
- Mazda AZ-Wagon (2008–2011)
- Mazda Biante (2008–2017)
- Mazda RX-8 R3 (2008–2012)
- Mitsubishi Toppo (2008–2013)
- Nissan Cube Z12 (2008–2019)
- Nissan Teana J32 (2008–2013)
- Subaru Dex (2008–2012)
- Subaru Exiga (2008–2018)
- Suzuki Lapin HE22S (2008–2015)
- Suzuki Palette (2008–2013)
- Suzuki Splash (2008–2014)
- Suzuki Wagon R (2008–2012)
- Toyota Alphard AH20 (2008–2015)
- Toyota Crown S200 Model (2008–2012)
- Toyota iQ AJ10 (2008–2015)

== 2009 ==
- Daihatsu Mira Cocoa (2009–2018)
- Daihatsu Tanto Exe (2009–2014)
- Honda Insight ZE2 (2009–2014)
- Honda Stepwgn (2009–2015)
- Lexus HS (2009–2014)
- Lexus IS C XE20 (2009–2015)
- Mazda3 BL (2009–2013)
- Mitsubishi Lancer Evolution X GSR-Premium (2009–2016)
- Mitsubishi i-MiEV (2009–2021)
- Nissan 370Z (2009–2022)
- Nissan Fuga Y51 (2009–2022)
- Nissan GT-R SpecV (2009)
- Subaru Forester SH (2009–2013)
- Subaru Legacy BM/BR (2009–2014)
- Suzuki Alto HA25 (2009–2014)
- Suzuki Kizashi (2009–2014)
- Toyota 4Runner N280 (2009–present)
- Toyota Land Cruiser Prado J150 (2009–2023)
- Toyota Mark X130 (2009–2019)
- Toyota Prius XW30 (2009–2015)

== 2010 ==
- Daihatsu Boon (2010–2016)
- Daihatsu Move LA100/LA110 (2010–2014)
- Honda CR-Z (2010–2016)
- Lexus GX J150 (2010–2023)
- Lexus LFA (2010–2012)
- Lexus RX AL10 (2010–2015)
- Mazda Carol Mk VI (2010–2014)
- Mazda Premacy (2010–2017)
- Mitsubishi RVR (2010–present)
- Nissan Elgrand E52 (2010–present)
- Nissan GT-R (2011–present)
- Nissan Juke F15 (2010–2019)
- Nissan Leaf ZE0 (2010–2017)
- Nissan NV200 (2010–present)
- Nissan Patrol Y62 (2010–present)
- Nissan Serena MkIV C26 (2010–2016)
- Subaru Dias Wagon (2010–2012)
- Subaru Outback (fourth generation) (2010–2014)
- Subaru Lucra (2010–2015)
- Subaru Pleo L2 (2010–2018)
- Subaru Stella (2010–2023)
- Suzuki Swift ZC (2010–2017)
- Subaru Trezia (2010–2015)
- Toyota FJ Cruiser GSJ15W (2010–2017)
- Toyota Ractis NCP120 (2010–2016)
- Toyota Verso-S NCP120 (2010–2017)
- Toyota Vitz XP130 (2010–2019)

== 2011 ==
- Daihatsu Mira LA300S (2011–2017)
- Hino Dutro (2011–present)
- Honda Civic (2011–2016)
- Honda Civic Si (2011–2015)
- Honda CR-V RM1/3/4 (2011–2016)
- Honda Fit Shuttle (2011–2015)
- Honda N-Box (2011–2017)
- Lexus CT A10 (2011–2022)
- Lexus GS 450 (2011–2020)
- Mazda RX-8 SPIRIT-R (2011–2012)
- Mitsubishi Minicab MiEV (2011–2013)
- Nissan Lafesta B35 (2011–2017)
- Nissan Latio (2011–2016)
- Nissan Skyline 55th Limited Edition (2011–2013)
- Subaru Impreza (2011–2016)
- Suzuki MR Wagon MF33S (2011–2016)
- Toyota Dyna U600/U800 (2011–present)
- Toyota Prius C NHP10 (2011–2020)
- Toyota Prius V ZVW40/41 (2011–2021)
- Toyota Sienta XP80 (2011–2015)
- Toyota ToyoAce (2011–2020)

== 2012 ==
- Honda Civic Hybrid (2012–2015)
- Honda N-One (2012–present)
- Isuzu Como (2012–2017)
- Mazda6 GJ1 (2012–2016)
- Mazda AZ-Wagon (2012–2017)
- Mazda Flair Wagon (2012–2013)
- Mitsubishi Dignity Series BHGY51 (2012–2016)
- Mitsubishi Proudia BY51 (2012–2016)
- Nissan Altima L33 (2012–2018)
- Nissan Caravan (2012–present)
- Nissan Cima Y51 (2012–2022)
- Nissan Note E12 (2012–2020)
- Nissan NT100 Clipper (2012–2013)
- Nissan NV100 Clipper (2012–2013)
- Subaru BRZ (2012–present)
- Subaru Sambar (seventh generation) (2012–present)
- Suzuki Swift Sport (ZC32S) (2012–2017)
- Suzuki Wagon R (2012–2017)
- Toyota 86 (2012–present)
- Toyota Auris E180 (2012–2018)
- Toyota Corolla (E160) (2012–present)
- Toyota Crown S210 Model (2012–2018)
- Toyota RAV4 XA40 (2012–2018)

== 2013 ==
- Daihatsu Mebius (2013–2021)
- Honda Accord (2013–2017)
- Honda Fit (2013–present)
- Honda Jade (2013–2020)
- Honda N-WGN (2013–present)
- Honda Odyssey (2013–present)
- Honda Vezel (2013–present)
- Infiniti Q50 (2013–present)
- Infiniti QX70 (2013–2017)
- Lexus ES 350 (2013–2018)
- Lexus IS XE30 (2013–present)
- Mazda3 BM (2013–2016)
- Mazda CX-5 (2013–2017)
- Mitsubishi Minicab MiEV Truck (2013)
- Mitsubishi Outlander (2013–present)
- Nissan Dayz (2013–present)
- Nissan Dualis J11 (2013–2022)
- Nissan NT100 Clipper (2013–present)
- Nissan NV100 Clipper (2013–present)
- Nissan Teana L33 (2013–2020)
- Nissan Tiida C12 (2013–2020)
- Suzuki Carry (2013–present)
- Suzuki Spacia (2013–present)
- Toyota Avalon XX40 (2013–2018)
- Toyota Corolla (E170) (2013–present)
- Toyota Harrier XU60 (2013–2020)
- Toyota Yaris XP150 (2013–2019)

== 2014 ==
- Daihatsu Copen (2014–present)
- Daihatsu Move LA150/LA160 (2014–2023)
- Daihatsu Wake (2014–2022)
- Honda City (2014–present)
- Honda Legend (2014–2021)
- Lexus NX AZ10 (2014–2021)
- Mazda Carol Mk VII (2014–present)
- Mazda Demio (2014–2019)
- Mazda Flair Wagon (2014–2017)
- Mitsubishi eK Space (2014–present)
- Mitsubishi Minicab (2014–2015)
- Nissan Skyline HV37 (2014–present)
- Subaru Forester SJ (2014–2018)
- Subaru Impreza WRX (2014–present)
- Subaru Legacy BN/BS (2014–present)
- Subaru Levorg (2014–2020)
- Subaru Sambar (eighth generation) (2014–present)
- Subaru XV (2014–2017)
- Suzuki Alto K (2014–present)
- Suzuki Hustler (2014–present)
- Toyota Land Cruiser 30th Anniversary Series 70 (2014–2015)
- Toyota Mirai JPD10 (2014–2020)
- Toyota Noah R80 (2014–2022)
- Toyota Probox (2014–present)
- Toyota Succeed (2014–2020)

== 2015 ==
- Daihatsu Cast (2015–2023)
- Fiat 124 Spider (2015–2020)
- Honda Civic (2015–present)
- Honda Civic Type R (2015–2017)
- Honda Fit Shuttle (2015–2022)
- Honda HR-V (2015–present)
- Honda S660 (2015–2022)
- Honda Legend (2015–2021)
- Honda Stepwgn (2015–present)
- Lexus RC XC10 (2015–present)
- Mazda Flair Crossover (2015–2017)
- Mazda CX-3 (2015–present)
- Mazda MX-5 (ND) (2015–present)
- Mitsubishi Lancer Evolution X Final Edition (2015–2016)
- Mitsubishi Minicab (2015–present)
- Nissan NV100 Clipper (2015–present)
- Subaru Outback (fifth generation) (2015–2020)
- Suzuki Every (2015–present)
- Suzuki Lapin HE33S (2015–present)
- Toyota Alphard AH30 (2015–2023)
- Toyota Sienta XP170 (2015–2022)

== 2016 ==
- Daihatsu Boon (2016–2023)
- Daihatsu Thor (2016–present)
- Honda Clarity Fuel Cell (2016–2021)
- Honda CR-V (2016–present)
- Honda Freed (2016–present)
- Honda NSX (2016–2022)
- Lexus RX AL20 (2016–2022)
- Mazda3 BN (2016–2018)
- Mazda6 GL (2016–present)
- Mazda CX-9 (2016–present)
- Mazda MX-5 RF (2016–present)
- Nissan Armada Y62 (2016–present)
- Nissan Serena MkV C27 (2016–2022)
- Subaru Chiffon (2016–present)
- Subaru Impreza (2016–present)
- Suzuki Ignis FF21S (2016–present)
- Subaru Justy (2016–present)
- Toyota C-HR AX10 (2016–2023)
- Toyota Coaster (2016–present)
- Toyota Prius XW50 (2016–2022)

== 2017 ==
- Daihatsu Mira LA350S (2017–present)
- Honda Accord (2017–present)
- Honda Civic Si (2017–present)
- Honda Civic Type R (2017–present)
- Honda N-Box (2017–present)
- Lexus LS 500 (2017–present)
- Mazda CX-5 (2017–present)
- Mazda CX-8 (2017–present)
- Nissan Leaf ZE1 (2017–present)
- Subaru Impreza XV (2017–present)
- Suzuki Swift (2017–present)
- Suzuki Wagon R (2017–present)
- Toyota JPN Taxi NTP10 (2017–present)

== 2018 ==
- Lexus ES 350 F-Sport (2018–present)
- Lexus LC Z100 (2018–present)
- Toyota Auris E210 (2018–present)
- Suzuki Jimny (2018–present)
- Toyota Camry XV70 (2018–2024)
- Toyota Century G60 (2018–present)
- Toyota Corolla (E210) (2018–present)
- Toyota Crown S220 Model (2018–2022)
- Toyota RAV4 XA50 (2018–present)

== 2019 ==
- Subaru Forester SK (2019–present)
- Toyota Copen GR Sport (2019–present)
- Toyota Supra J29/DB (2019–present)

== 2020 ==
- Subaru Levorg (2020–present)
- Toyota GR Yaris (2020–present)
- Toyota Mirai (2020–present)
- Toyota Yaris XP210 (2020–present)

== 2022 ==
- Toyota Prius XW60 (2022–present)

== 2023 ==
- Subaru Brz (2023–present)
- Toyota GT86 (2023–present)

== Notes ==
Note:Japan was eager to learn, finally. Japan's approach to modernity was a quicker and more pragmatic one.
