= Isuzu Super Cruiser =

Isuzu Super Cruiser （FHI HD-2 body）
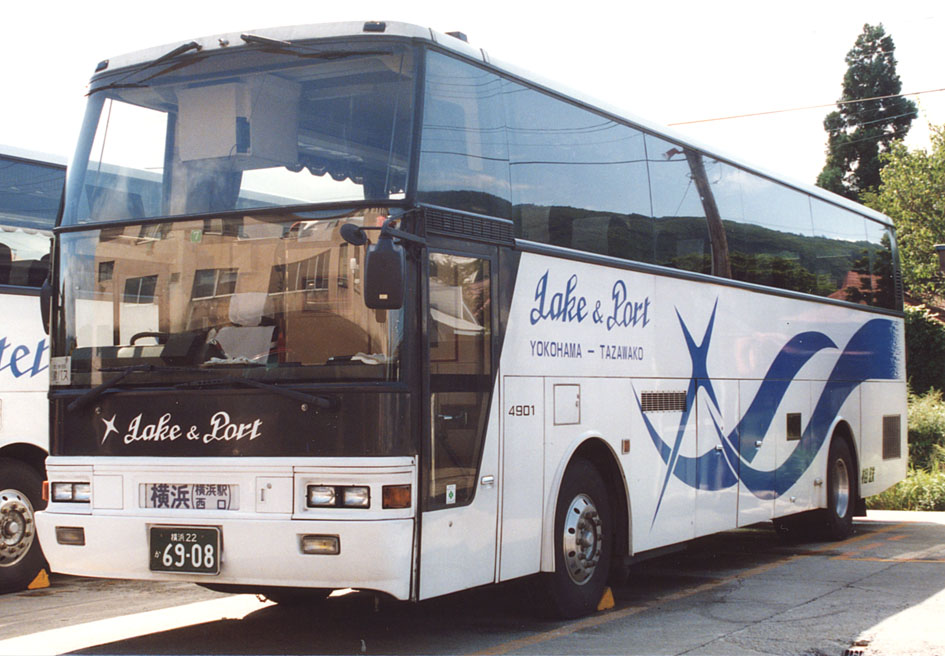

Overview
- Manufacturer: Isuzu
- Production: 1986–1996

Body and chassis
- Class: Commercial vehicle
- Body style: Single-deck coach

Powertrain
- Engine: 10PC1, 10PD1, 10PE1 (All V-10)
- Transmission: 6-speed manual

Dimensions
- Wheelbase: 5.45m, 6.15m
- Length: 11.3m, 12.0m
- Width: 2.5m

Chronology
- Predecessor: Isuzu LV219; Bedford Y Series (Britain)
- Successor: Isuzu Gala

The Isuzu Super Cruiser (kana:いすゞ・スーパークルーザー) is a heavy-duty coach built by Isuzu. The range was primarily available as a tourist coach, but was primarily unavailable with left-hand drive.

== Isuzu tourist coaches (predecessors of Super Cruiser) ==
- BH162 (1959)
- BU20PA (1962)
- BU30P (1963)
- BH20/50P (1969)
- BH21P (1973)
- CRA (1975)
- K-CRA/CSA (1980)
- P-LV219 (1984)
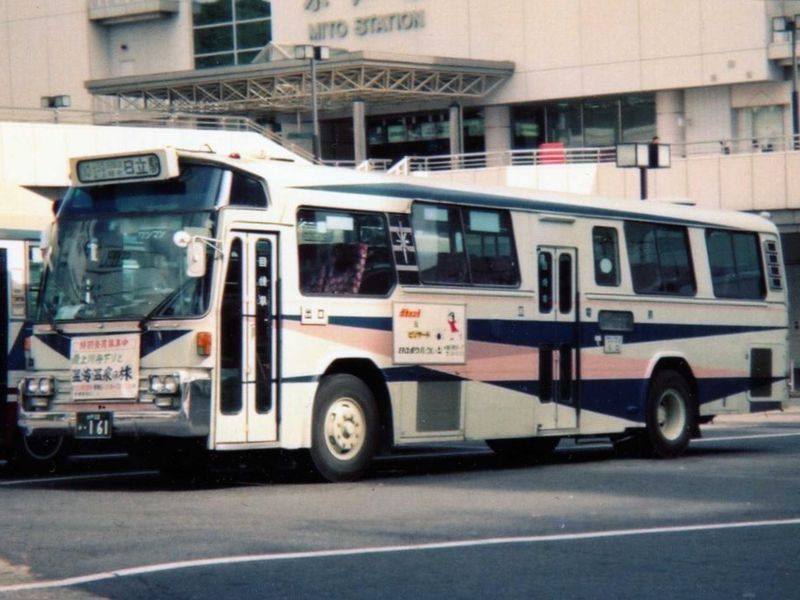
CRA CRA650

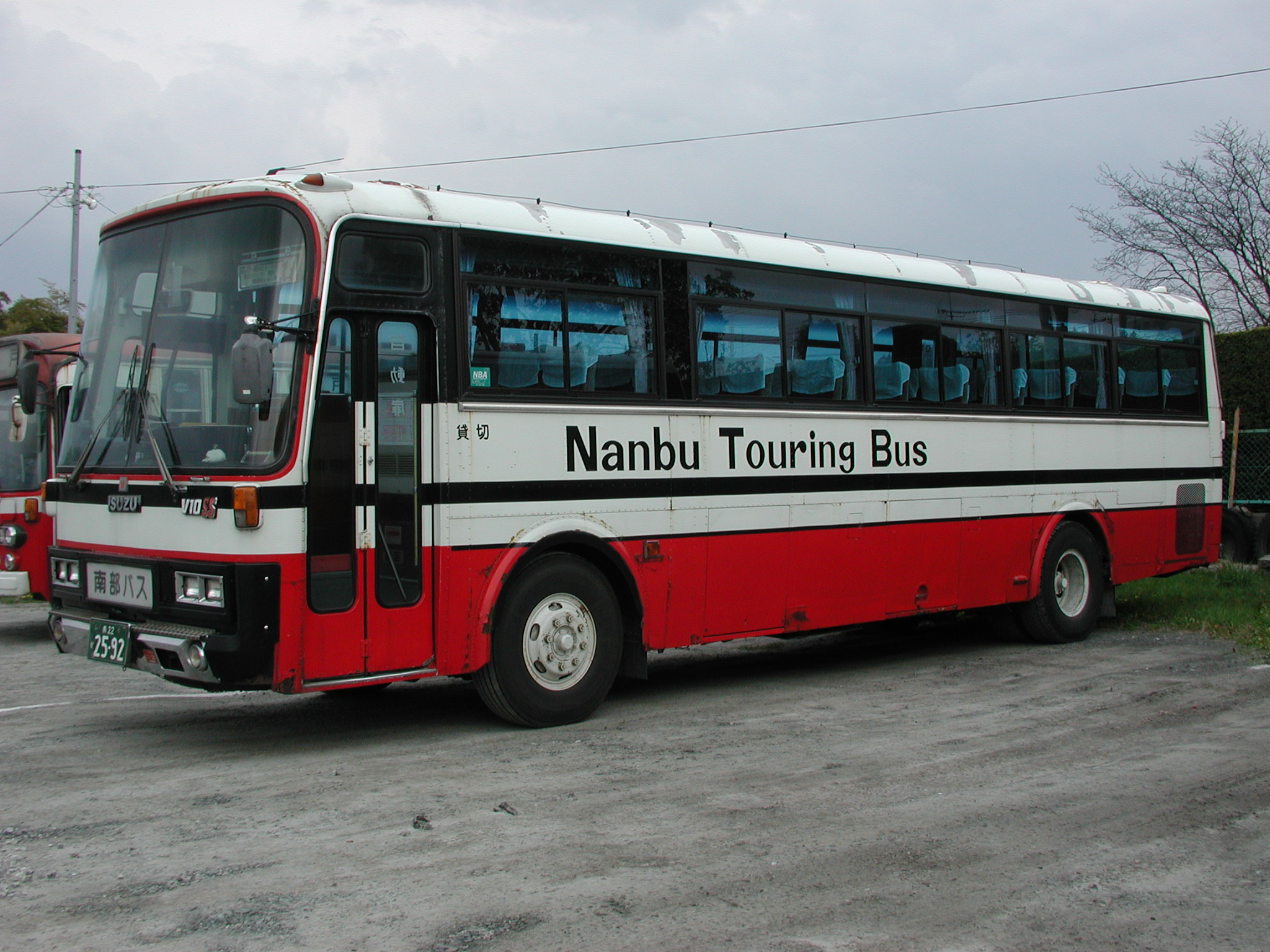
CSA K-CSA650

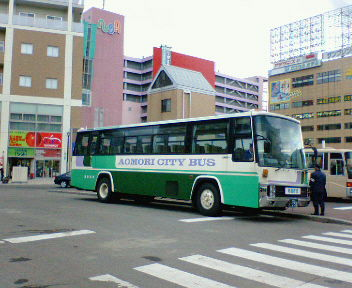
LV219 P-LV219S

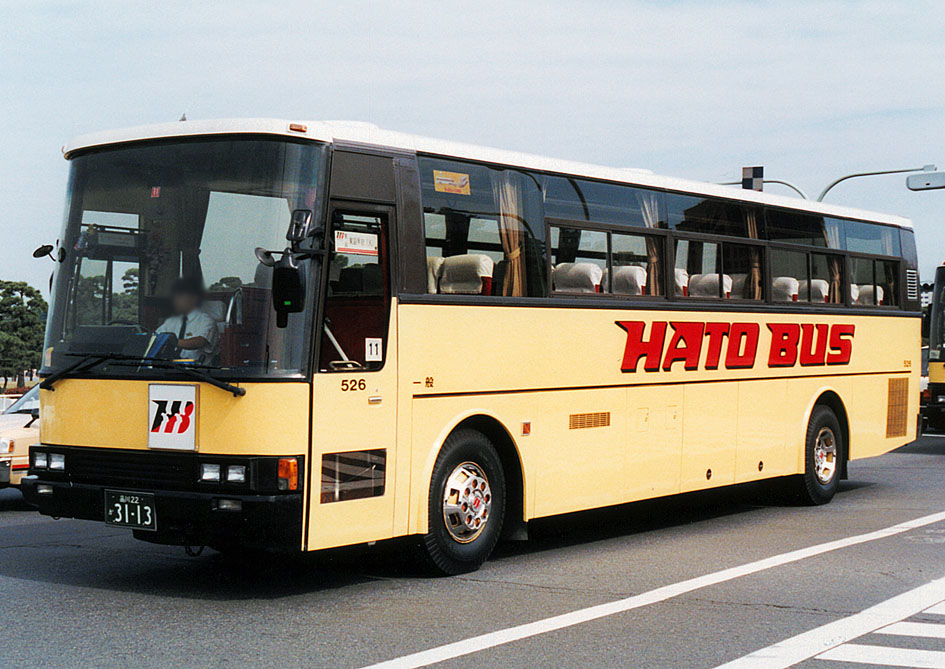
LV219 P-LV219S (FHI R3P body)

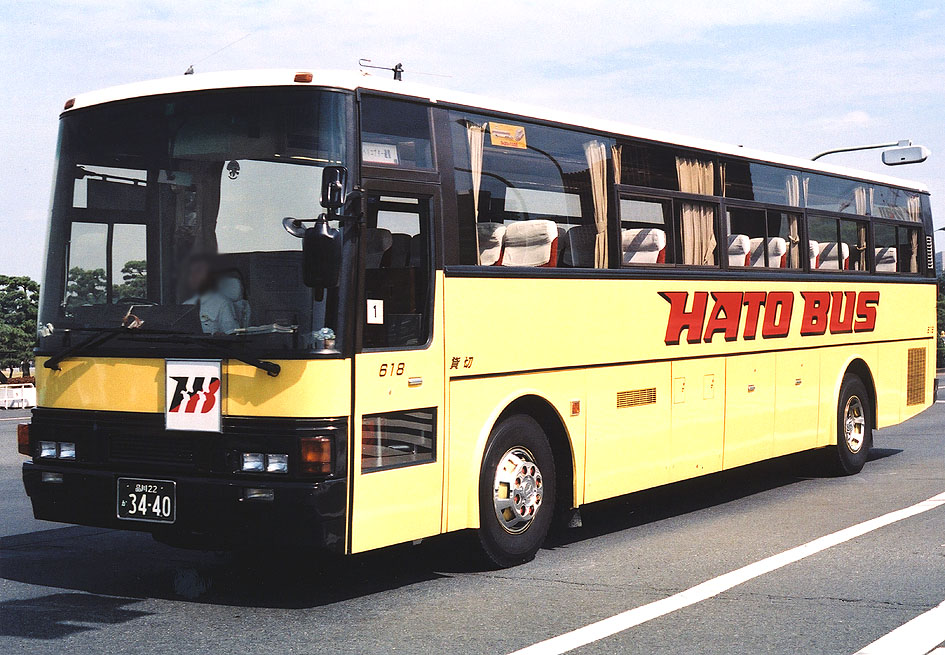
LV219 P-LV219S (FHI HD-1 body)

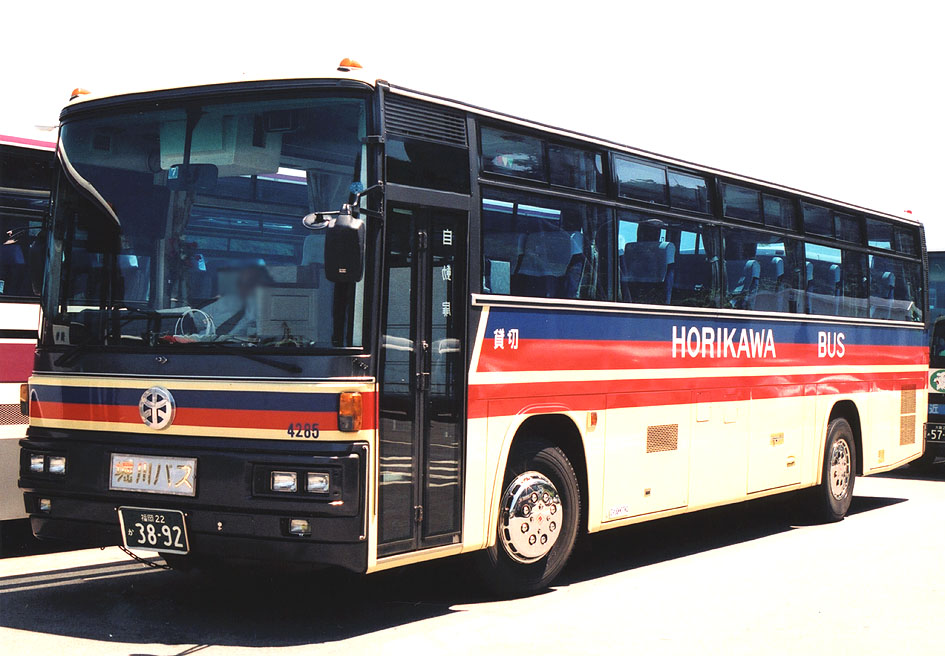
LV219 P-LV219Q (Nishi-nippon Shatai Kogyo C-1 body)

== Models ==
- P-LV719 (1986)
- U-LV771 (1990)
- KC-LV781 (1995)
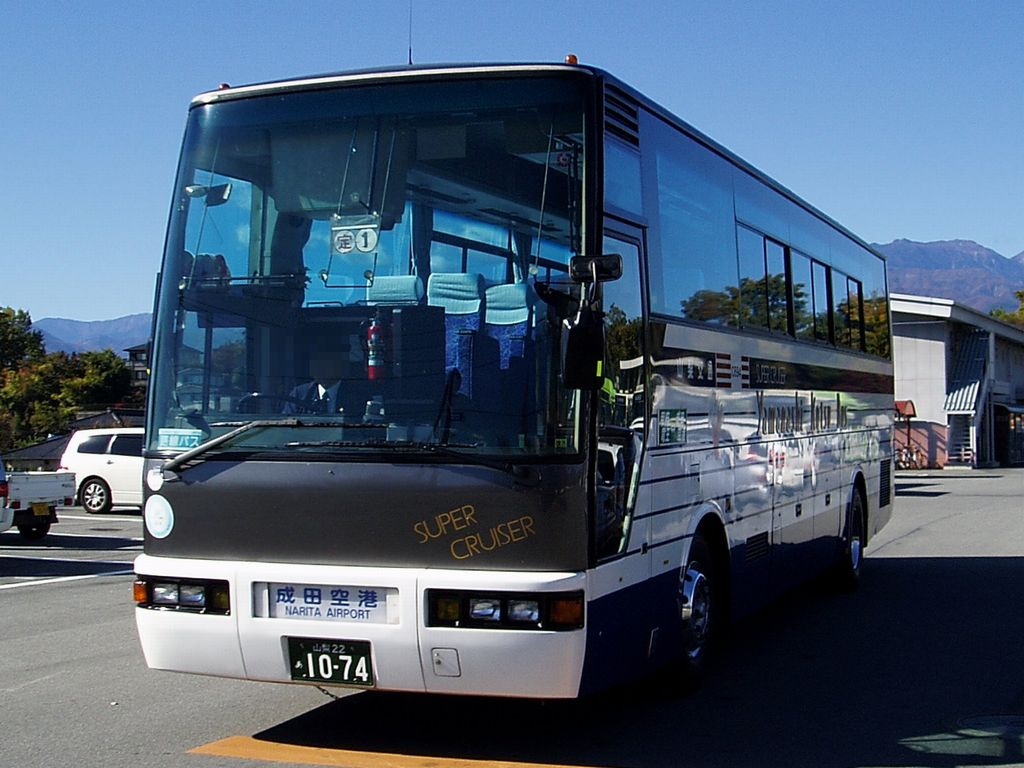
Super Cruiser SHD P-LV719R

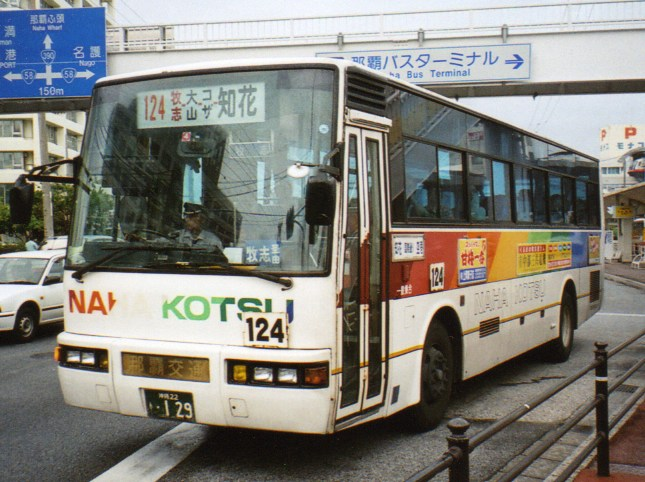
Super Cruiser HD P-LV719N

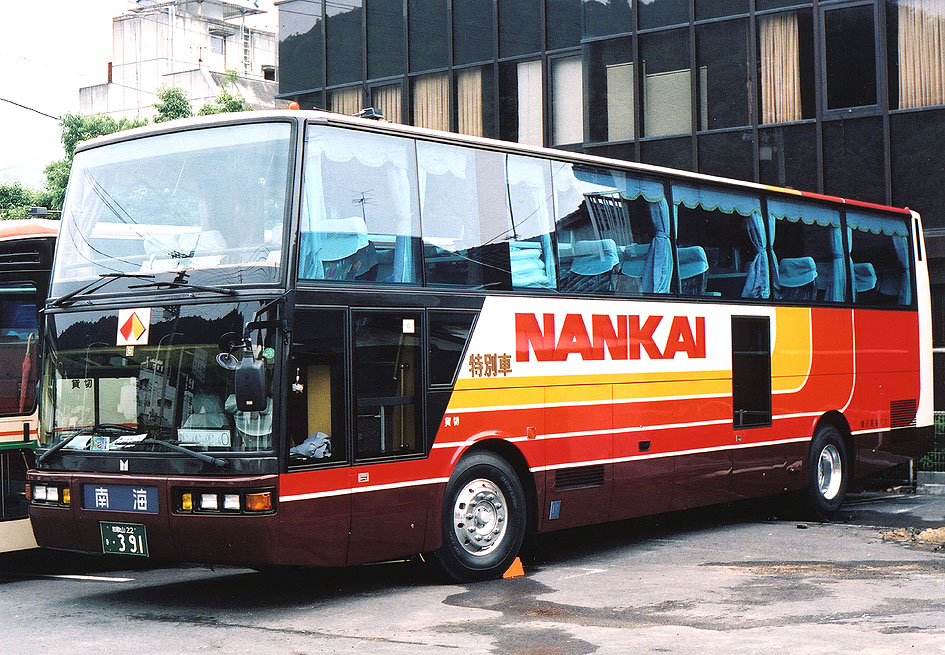
Super Cruiser UFC U-LV771R

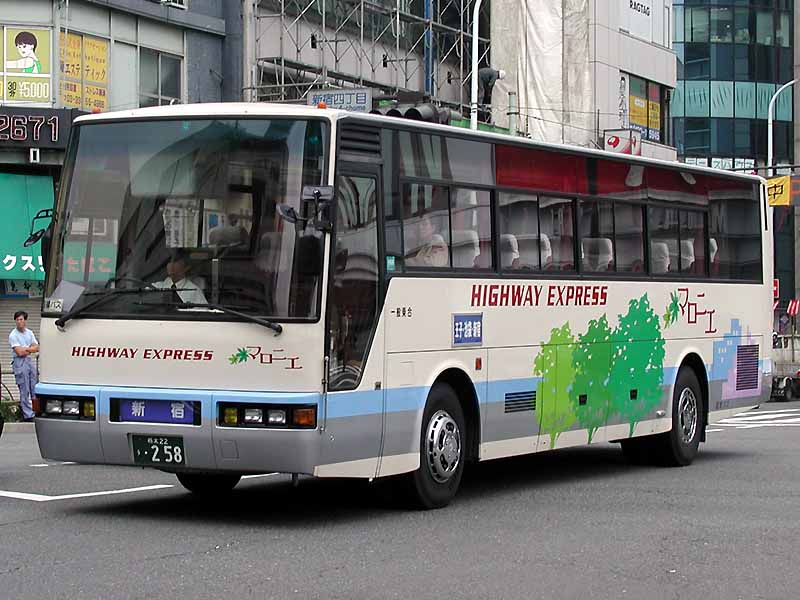
Super Cruiser HD P-LV719R

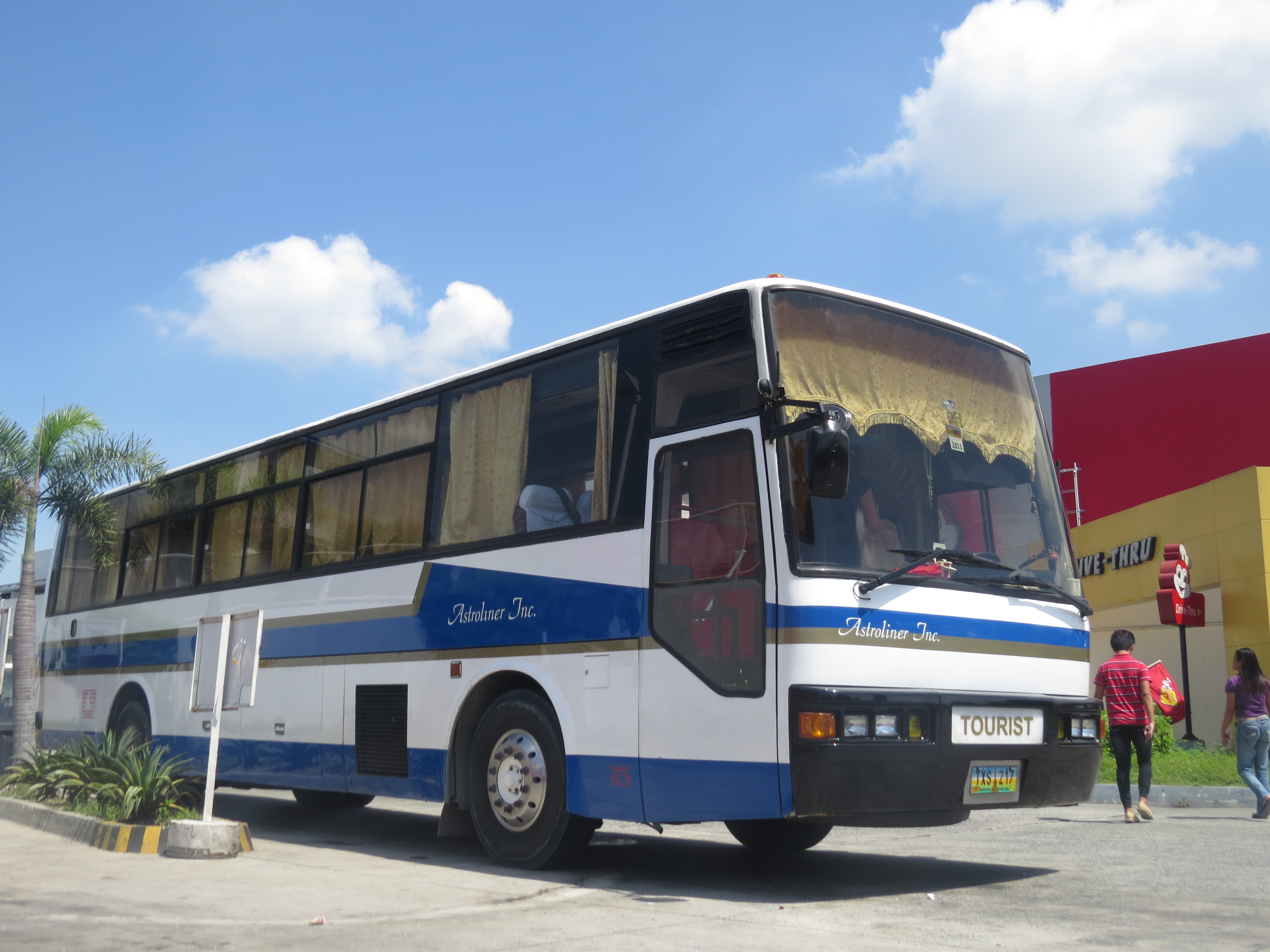
Super Cruiser P-LV719R as second-hand unit in the Philippines

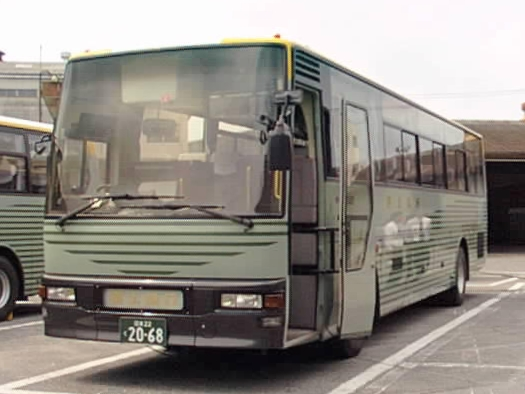
Super Cruiser HD U-LV771R

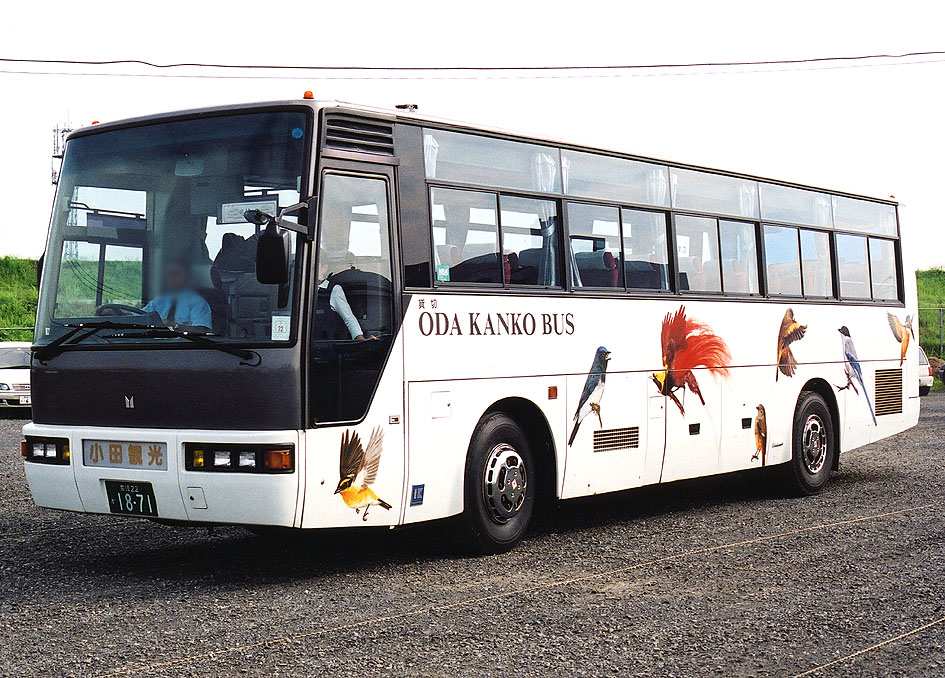
Super Cruiser HD U-LV771N

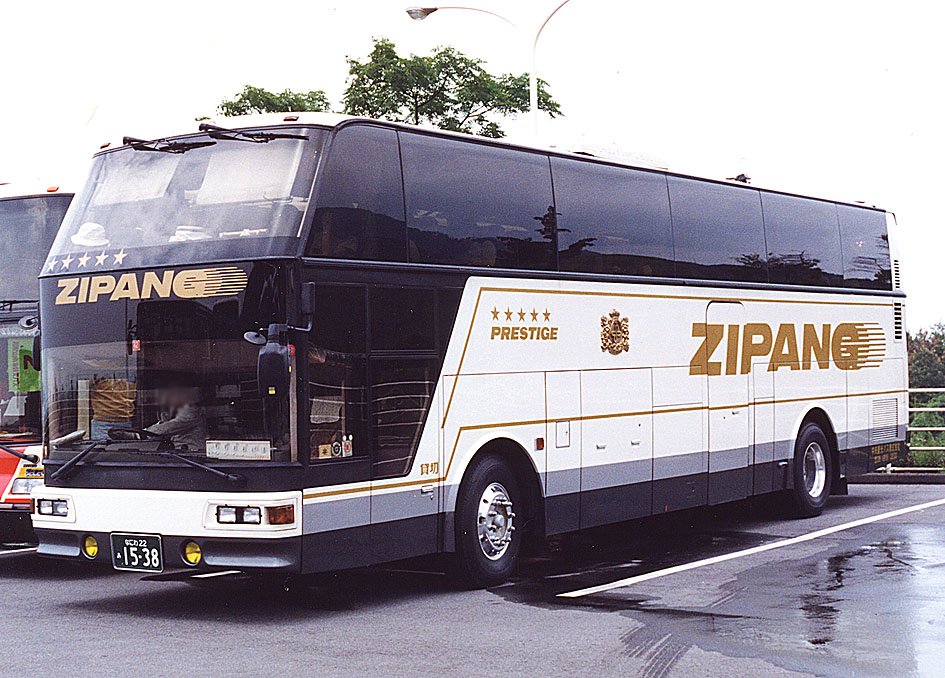
Super Cruiser P-LV719R (FHI HD-2 UFC body)

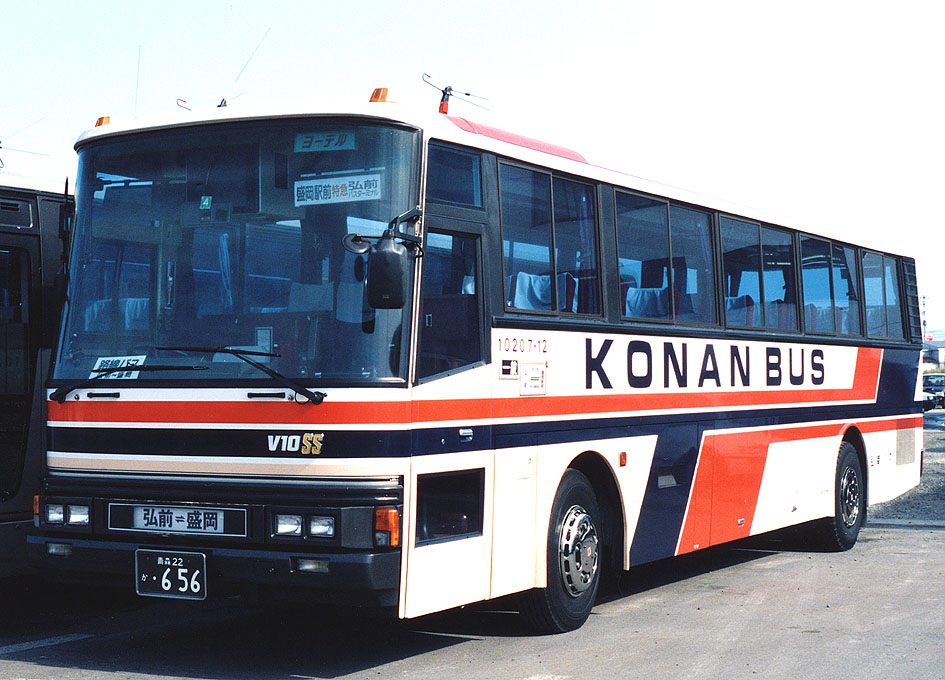
Super Cruiser P-LV719R (FHI R3 body)

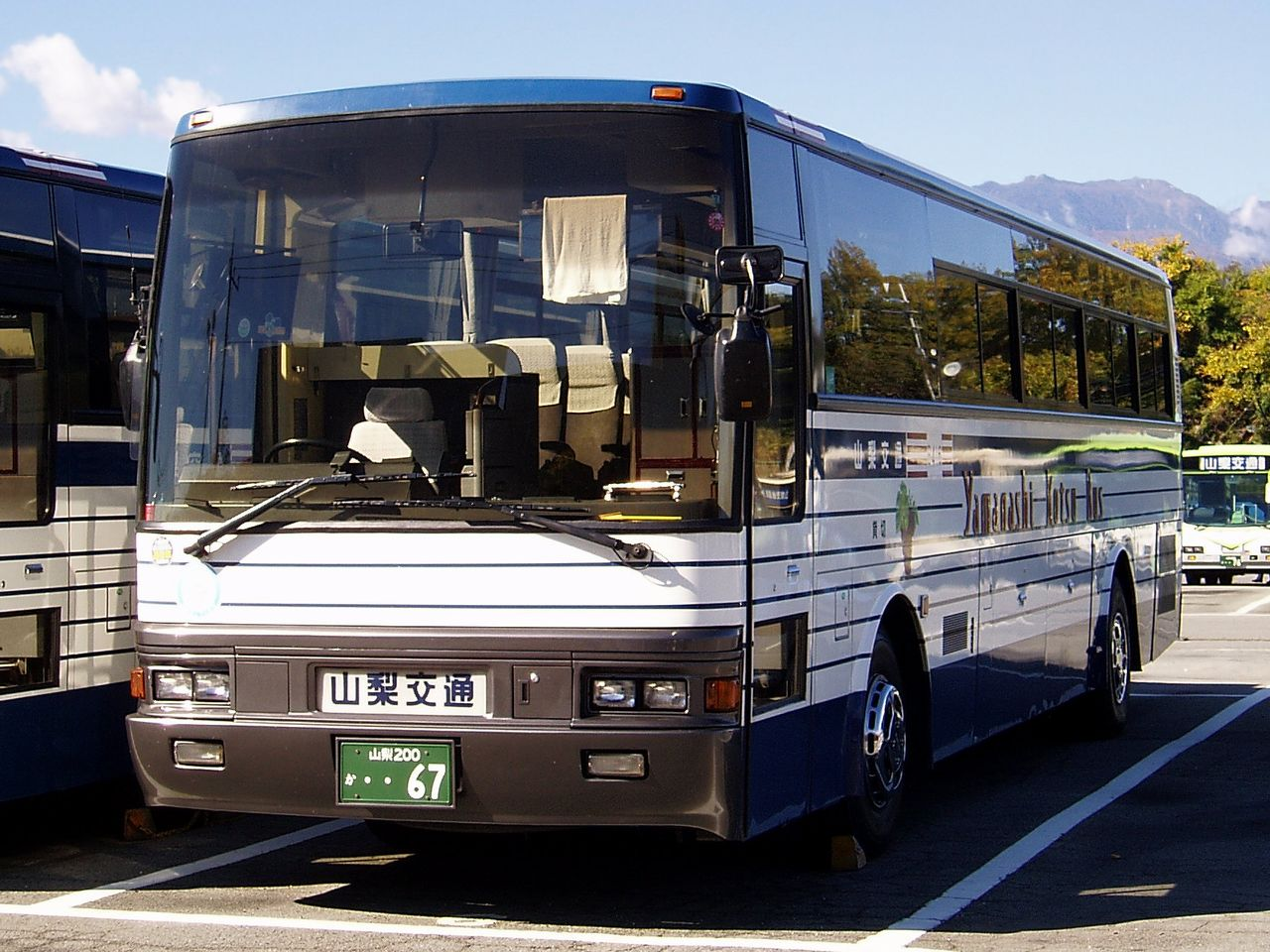
Super Cruiser U-LV771R (FHI HD-1 body)

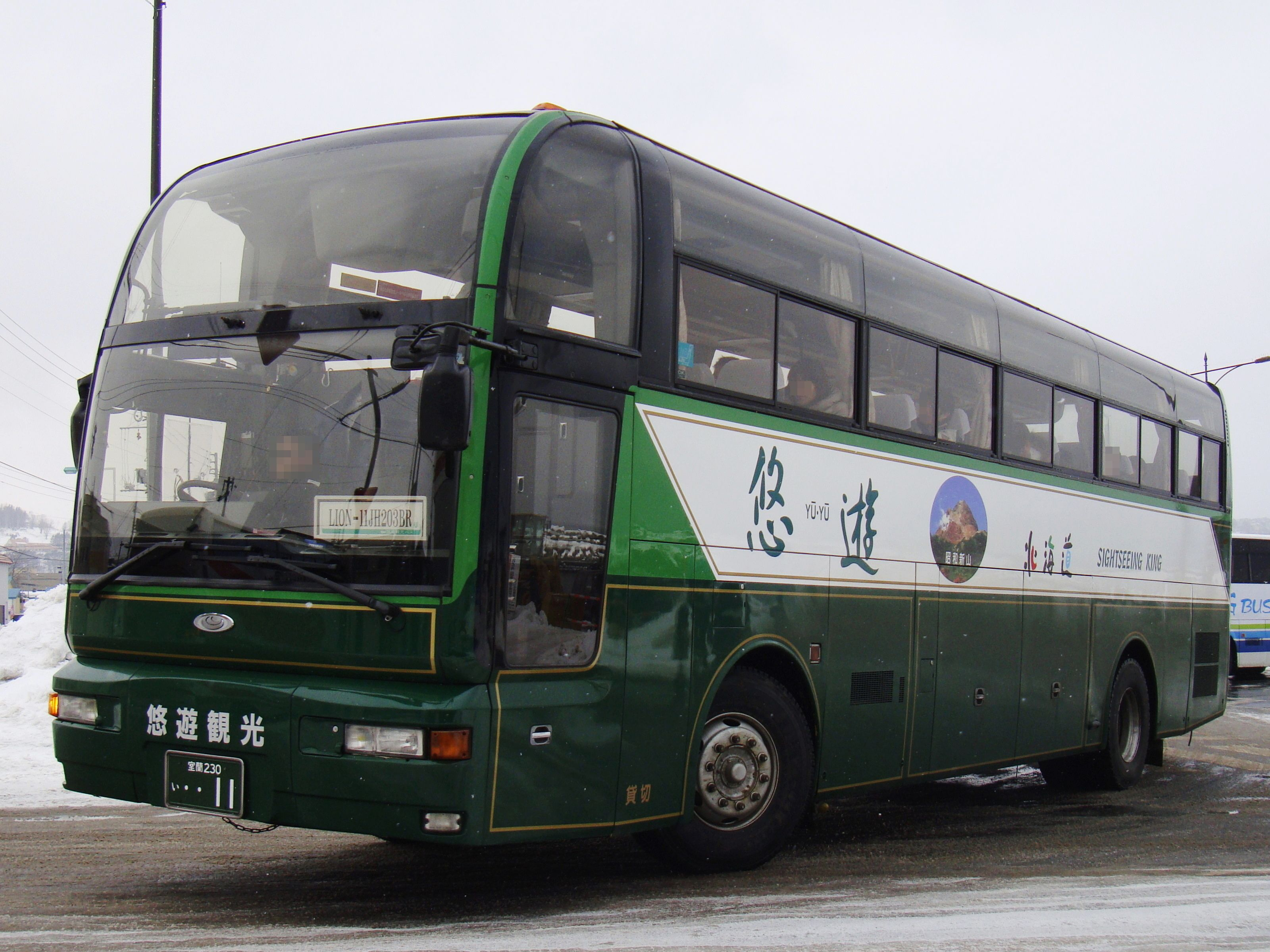
Super Cruiser KC-LV781R (FHI 7S body)

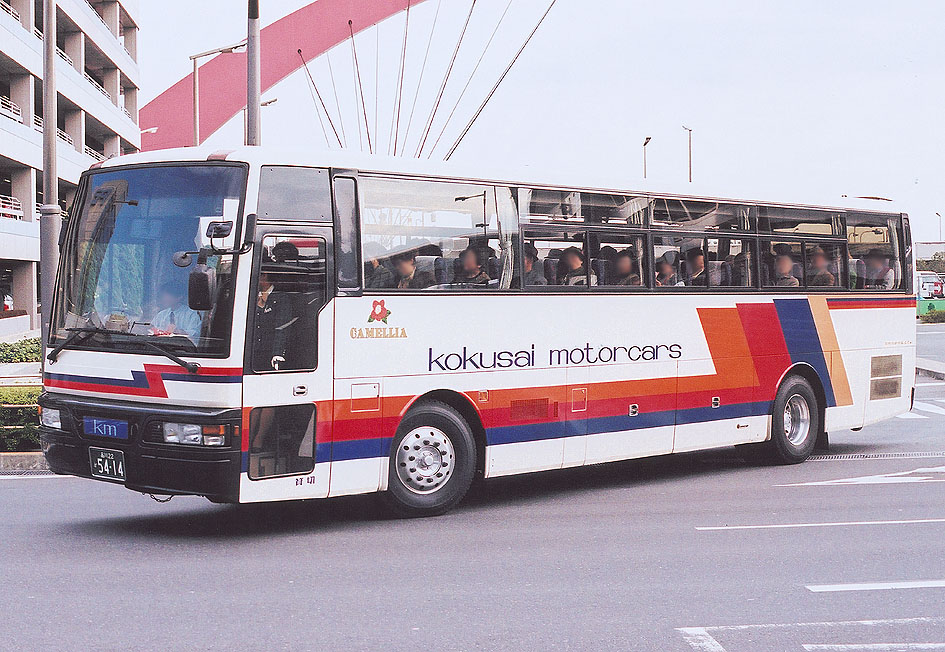
Super Cruiser KC-LV781R (FHI 7HD body)

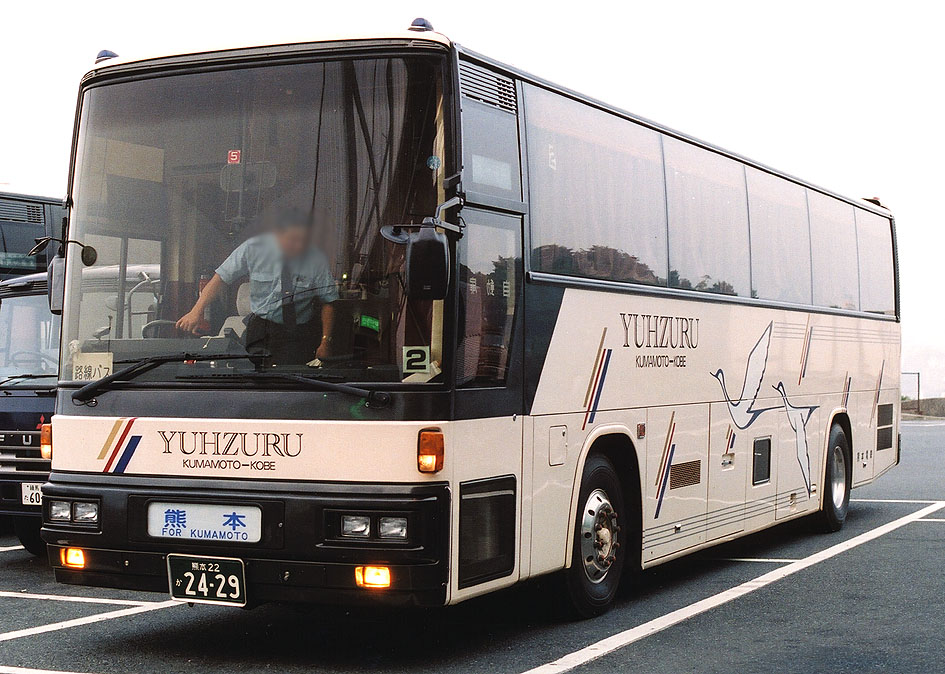
Super Cruiser P-LV719R (Nishi-nippon Shatai Kogyo SD-1 body)

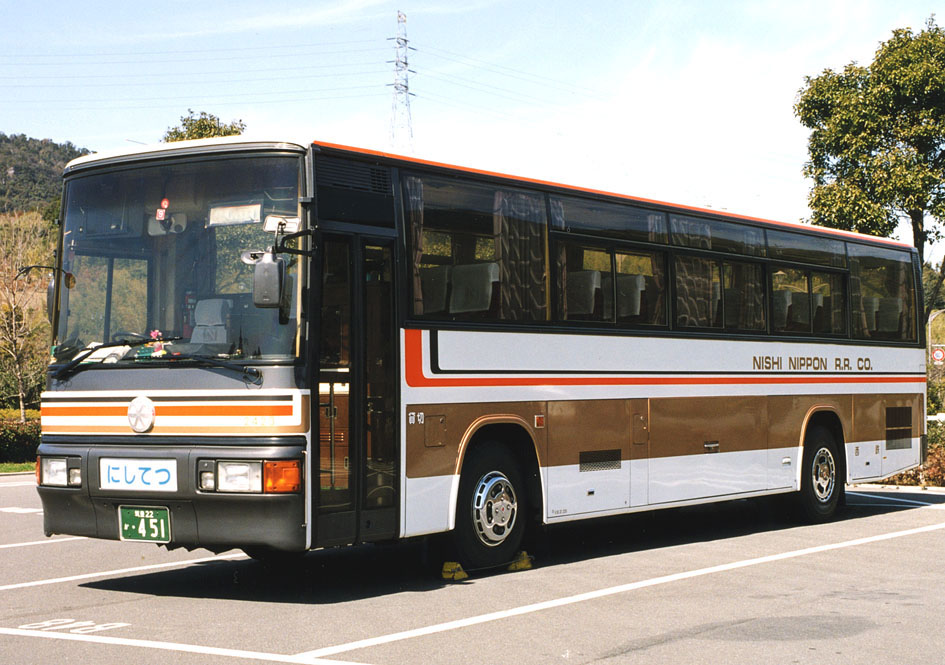
Super Cruiser P-LV719R (Nishi-nippon Shatai Kogyo C-1 body)

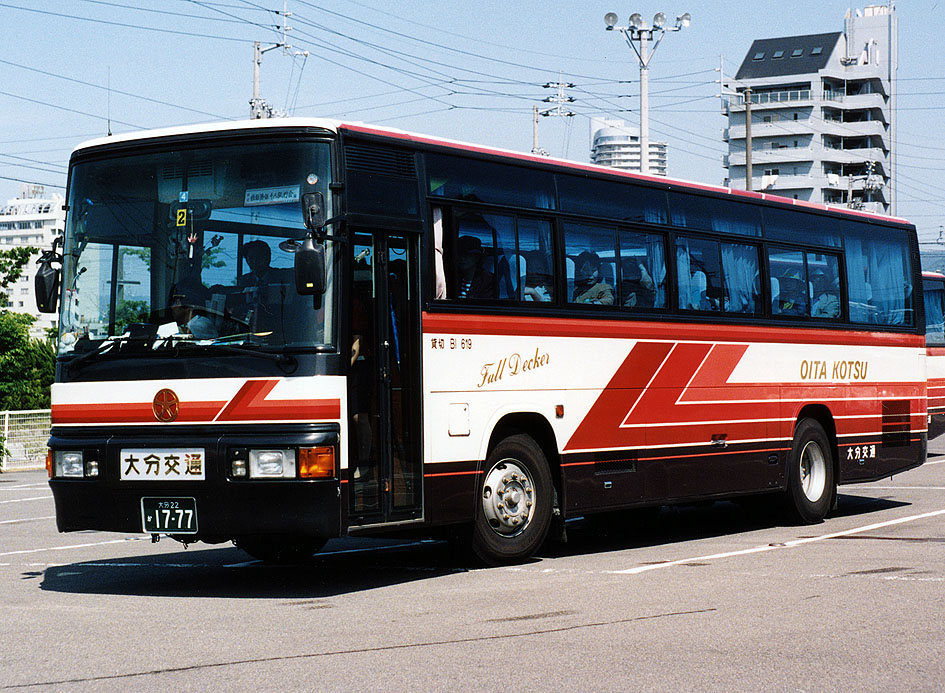
Super Cruiser P-LV719N (Nishi-nippon Shatai Kogyo C-1 body)

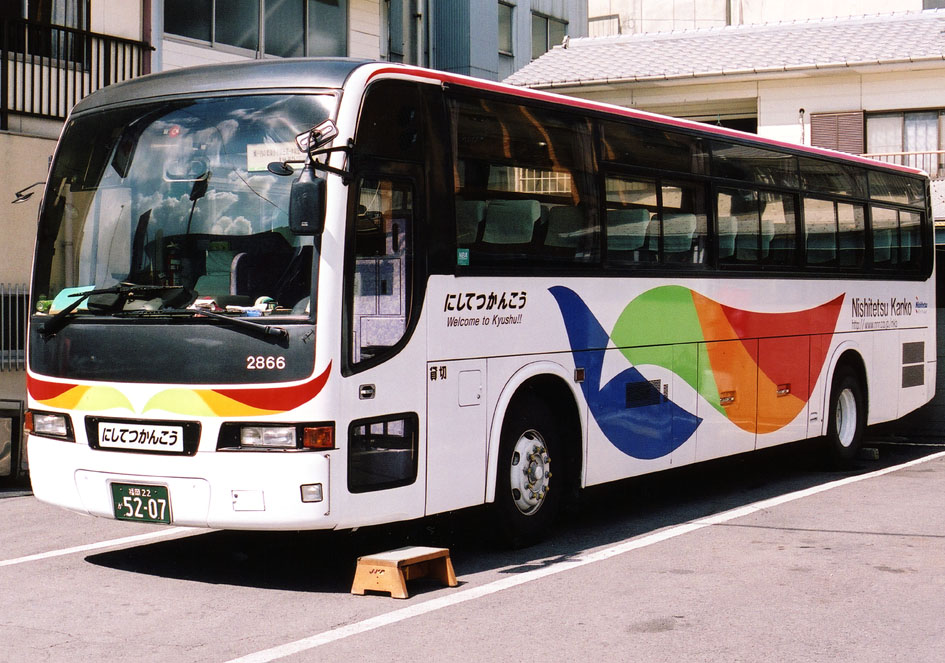
Super Cruiser U-LV771R (Nishi-nippon Shatai Kogyo C-1 body)

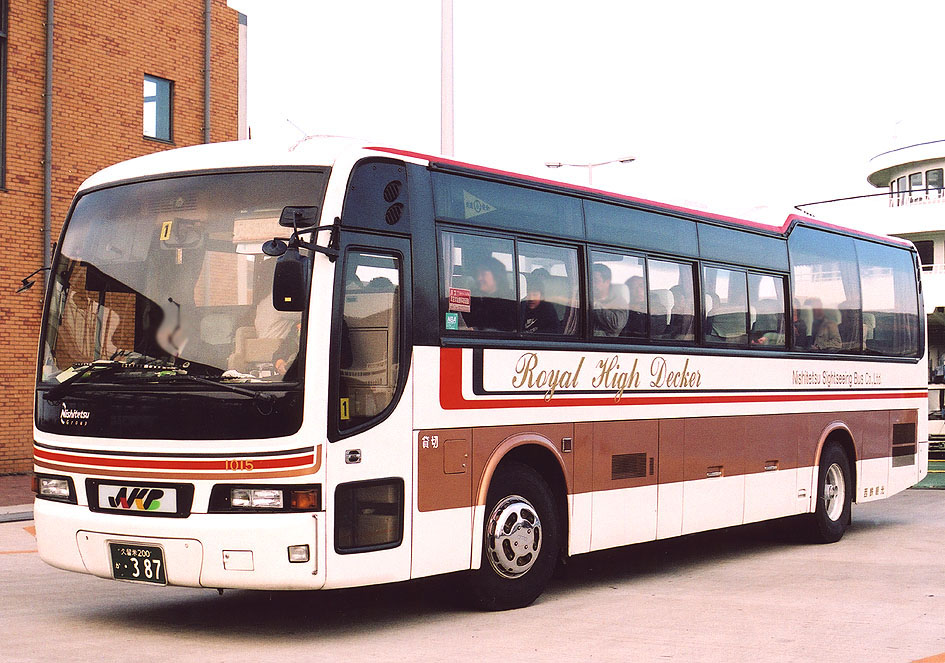
Super Cruiser U-LV771R (Nishi-nippon Shatai Kogyo C-2 body)

== Model lineup ==
- HD (Hi-decker) 12m、11.3m
- SHD (Super hi-decker) 12m
  - UFC (Under-floor cockpit) 12m
