= Isuzu Journey-Q =

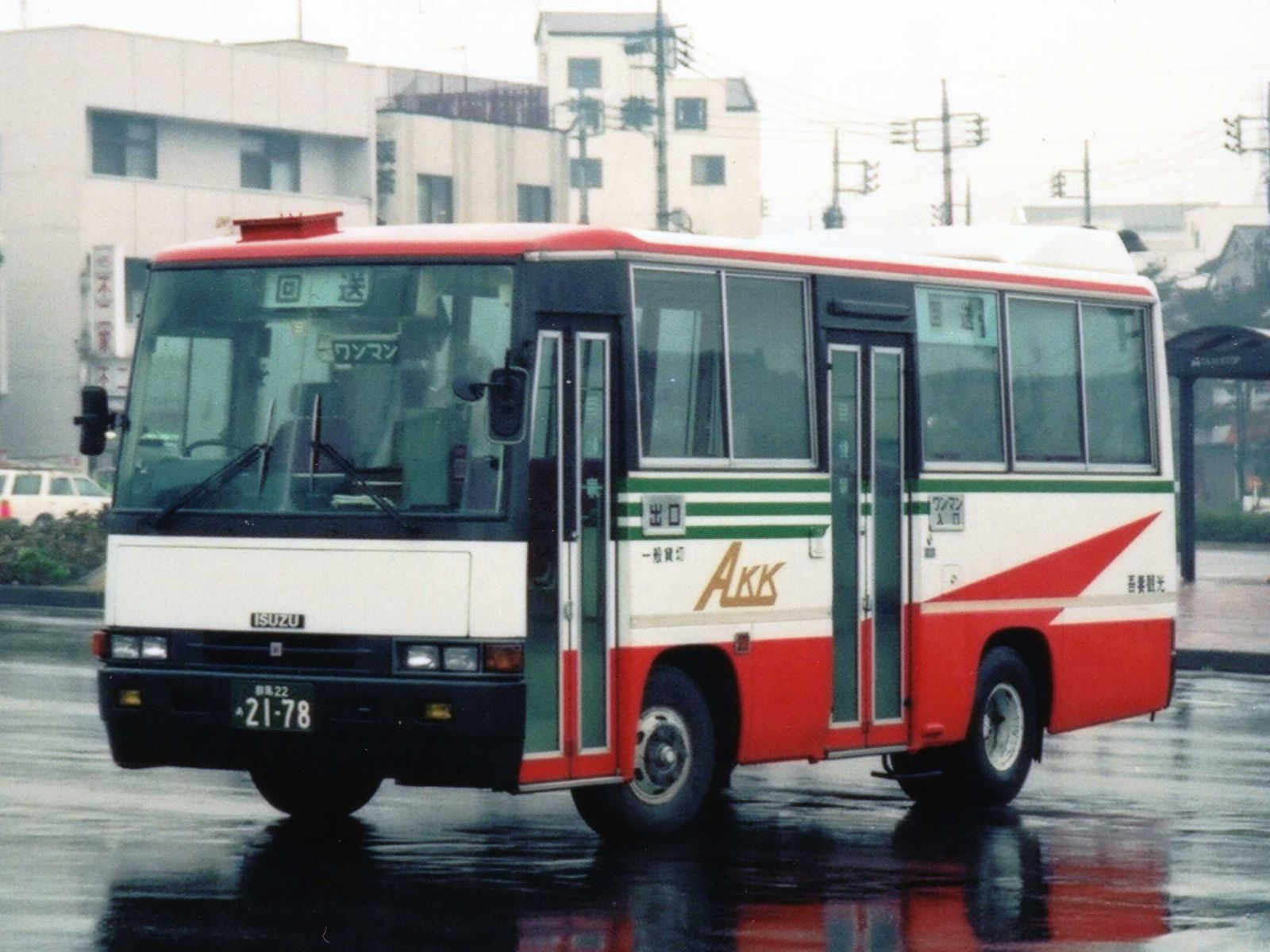

Overview
- Manufacturer: Isuzu
- Production: 1976-2001

Body and chassis
- Class: Buses
- Body style: Bus

Powertrain
- Engine: 6BG1,6HE1
- Transmission: Isuzu (manual)

Dimensions
- Length: 7m

Chronology
- Predecessor: Isuzu Journey-J

The Isuzu Erga Journey-Q (kana:いすゞ・ジャーニQ) is a light-duty bus built by Isuzu. The range was primarily available city bus and tourist coach.

== Models ==
- DBR370 (1976)
- K-DBR370 (1979)
- P-MR112F (1984)
- P-MR112D (1986)
- U-MR132D (1990)
- U-GR432F (1991)
- KC-GR433F (1996)
- KK-GR433F (1999)
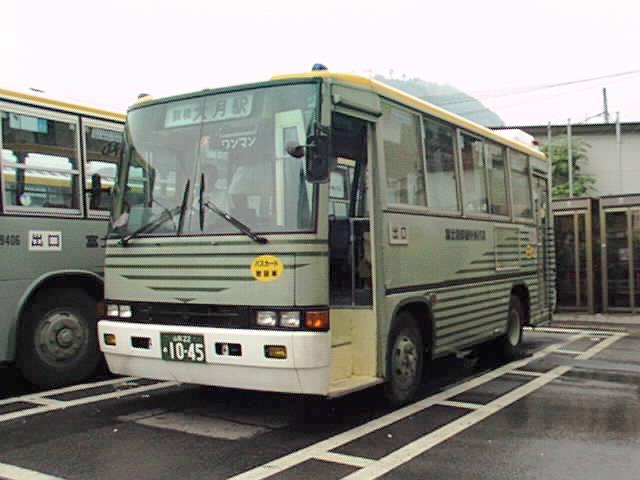
Journey-Q P-MR112D

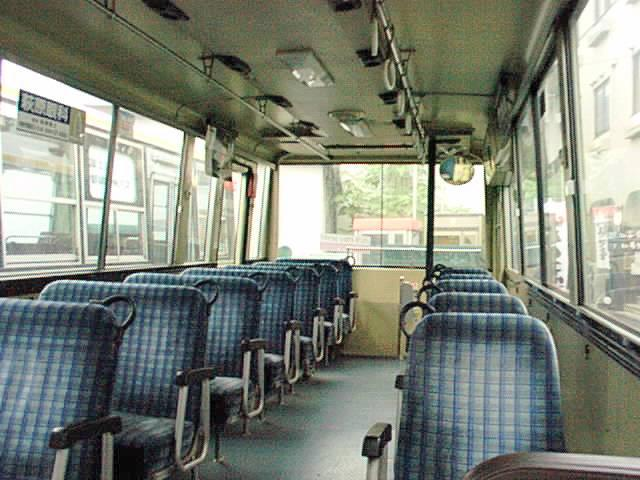
Journey-Q interior

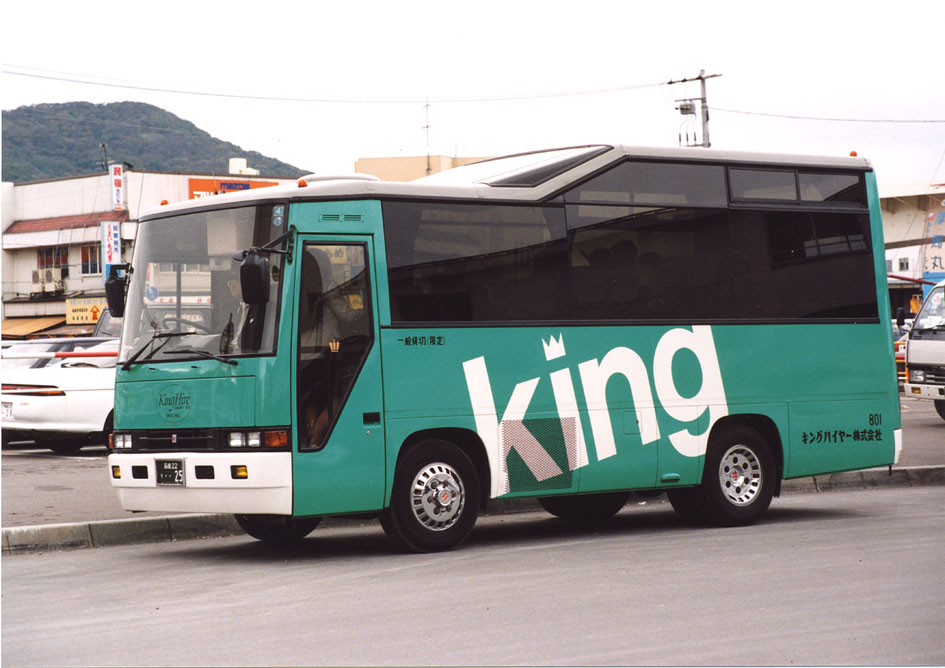
Journey-Q Royal Decker U-MR132D

== See also ==
- List of buses
