= Honda Odyssey =

Honda Odyssey can refer to three motor vehicles manufactured by Honda:

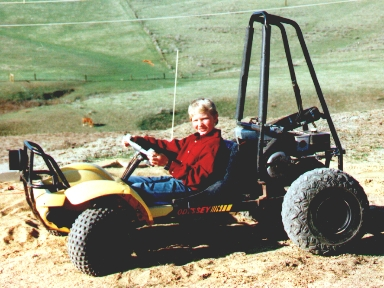
Honda Odyssey (ATV)

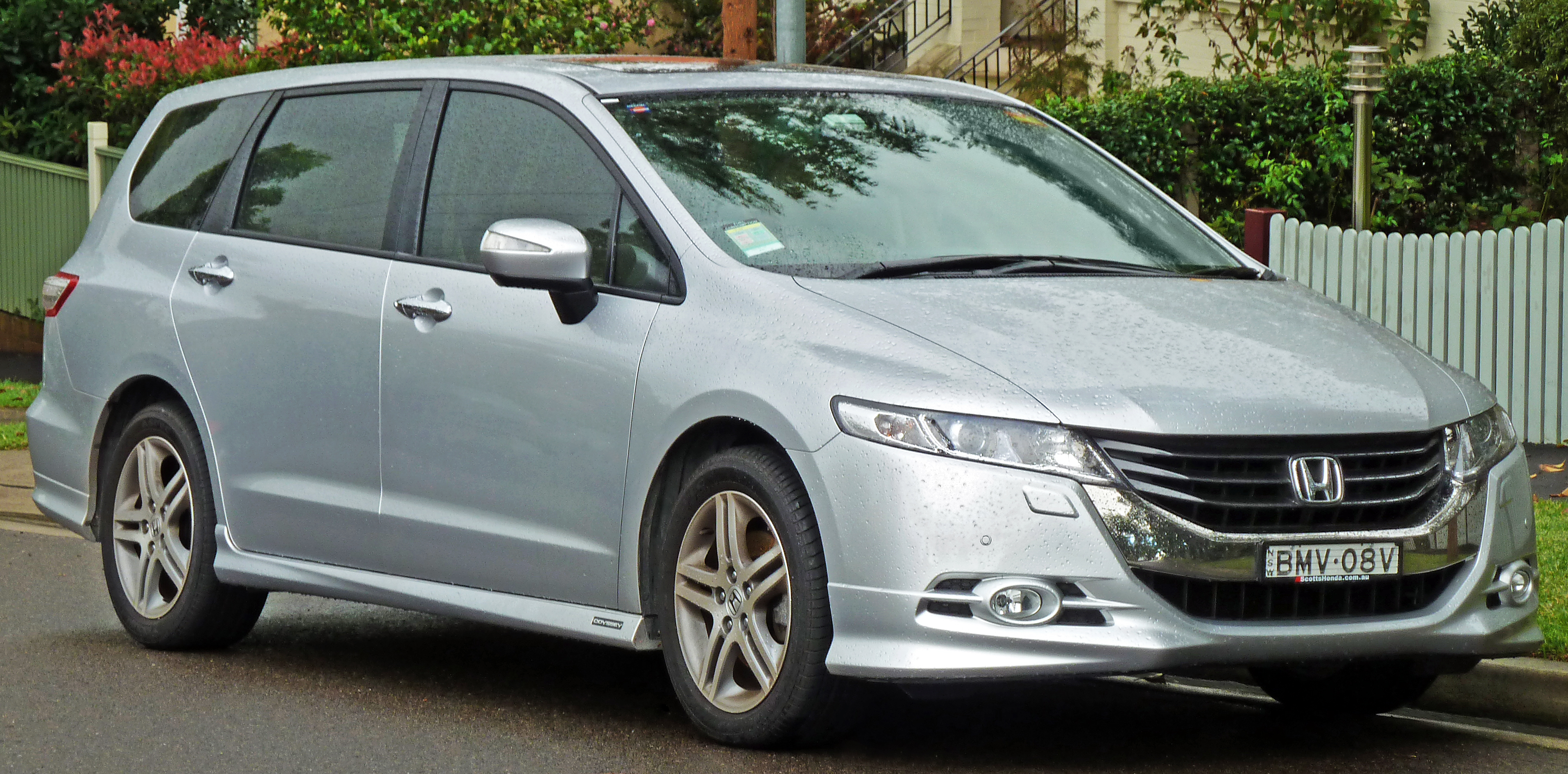
Honda Odyssey (Minivan, international)

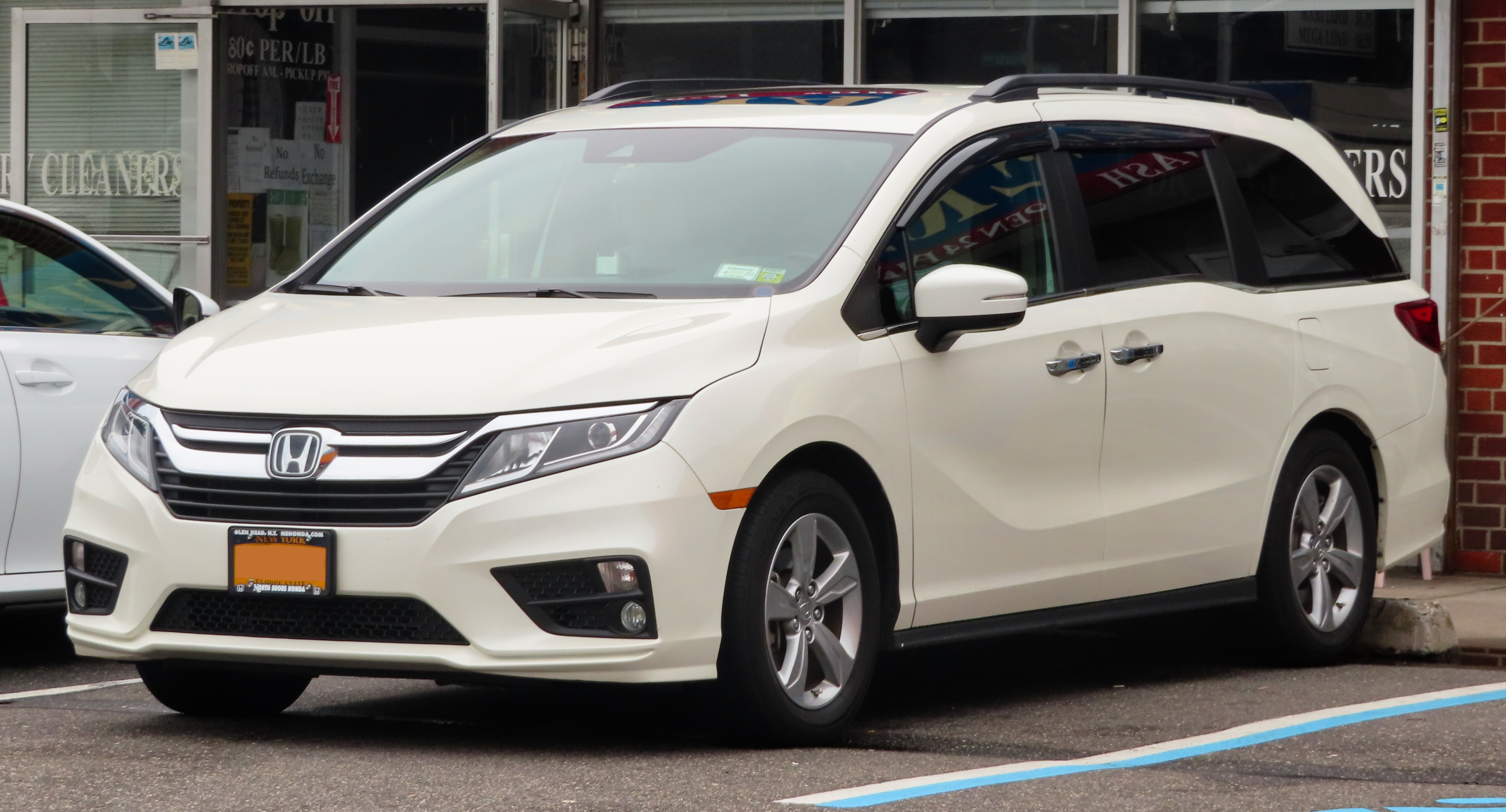
Honda Odyssey (Minivan, North America)

- Honda Odyssey (ATV), an all-terrain vehicle (1977—1989)
- Honda Odyssey (minivan), a brand of two different Honda minivan models for different markets
  - Honda Odyssey (international), sold in Japan and most other parts of the world
  - Honda Odyssey (North America), sold primarily in North America and certain other markets
