= Isuzu Bellett =

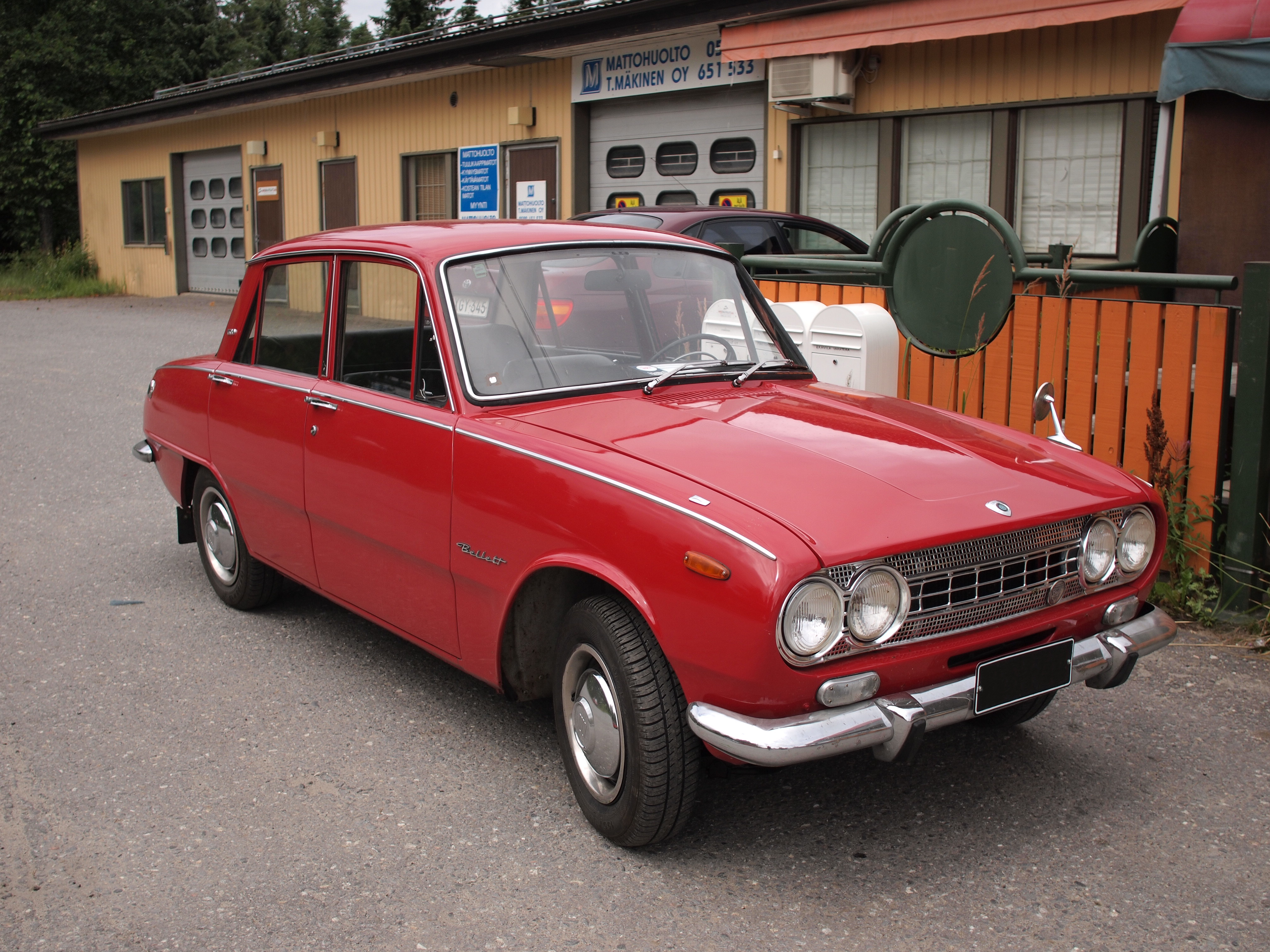
- Isuzu Bellett four-door sedan

Overview
- Manufacturer: Isuzu
- Production: 1963–1973
- Assembly: Japan: Kawasaki, Kanagawa (Kawasaki Plant); New Zealand: Thames; Philippines: Las Piñas (1965–1974); Canada: Point Edward, Nova Scotia (Canadian Motor Industries)

Body and chassis
- Class: Compact
- Body style: 2/4-door sedan; 2-door coupé; 2-door fastback coupé; 3-door van; 2-door coupe utility (Wasp)
- Layout: FR layout

Powertrain
- Engine: 1.3 L G130 OHV I4; 1.5 L G150 OHV I4; 1.6 L G160 OHV I4; 1.6 L G161/G161S SOHC I4; 1.6 L G161W DOHC I4; 1.8 L G180 SOHC I4; 1.8 L C180 diesel I4
- Transmission: 4-speed manual 3-speed automatic

Dimensions
- Wheelbase: 2350 mm (92.5 in)
- Length: 4032 mm (158.7 in)
- Width: 1499 mm (59 in)
- Height: 1391 mm (54.8 in)
- Curb weight: 921 kg (2030 lb)

Chronology
- Predecessor: Isuzu Hillman Minx
- Successor: Isuzu Gemini

The Isuzu Bellett is a subcompact car produced by the Japanese manufacturer Isuzu between 1963 and 1973. Designed by Isuzu, the Bellett replaced the Isuzu Hillman Minx, manufactured by Isuzu under license with the Rootes Group.

The car was available as a four-door or two-door sedan, a rare two-door station wagon marketed as a commercial vehicle, called the Bellett Express, and an even rarer one-ton commercial variant marketed as the Isuzu Wasp. There was also a four-door sedan with different bodywork and rear suspension, called the Bellett B. Lastly there was a two-door coupé and a fastback version of the same. After General Motors acquired a stake in Isuzu, the Bellett was replaced by GM's "global" T-car, initially called Isuzu Bellett Gemini and later simply Isuzu Gemini, which technically had little to do with its predecessor. A total of 170,737 original Belletts were manufactured.

The word Isuzu translated into English means "fifty bells." The nameplate "Bellett" referred to "a smaller Bellel", a previous, larger model manufactured by Isuzu.

== Sedan ==
Launched in June 1963, the sedan used a 1.5 L OHV gasoline Inline-four engine and a 1.8 L diesel engine. The 50 PS (37 kW; 49 hp) diesel received very low gearing of 4.1:1 — optionally available to the 1.5 as well — resulting in a top speed of only 104 km/h (65 mph). In April 1964, they were joined by the 1.3 L OHC inline-four engine already in use in the Wasp pickup truck, at which time a three-door van/wagon version called the Express (in Japan) was also added to the lineup. In 1966, the a mild facelift featured a revised front fascia, and the Bellett B model was added. At the very end of 1966, a 1.6-litre SOHC engine was added for the 1600 GT. In 1971 the Bellett range underwent a second facelift, which also marked the end of diesel-powered Belletts.

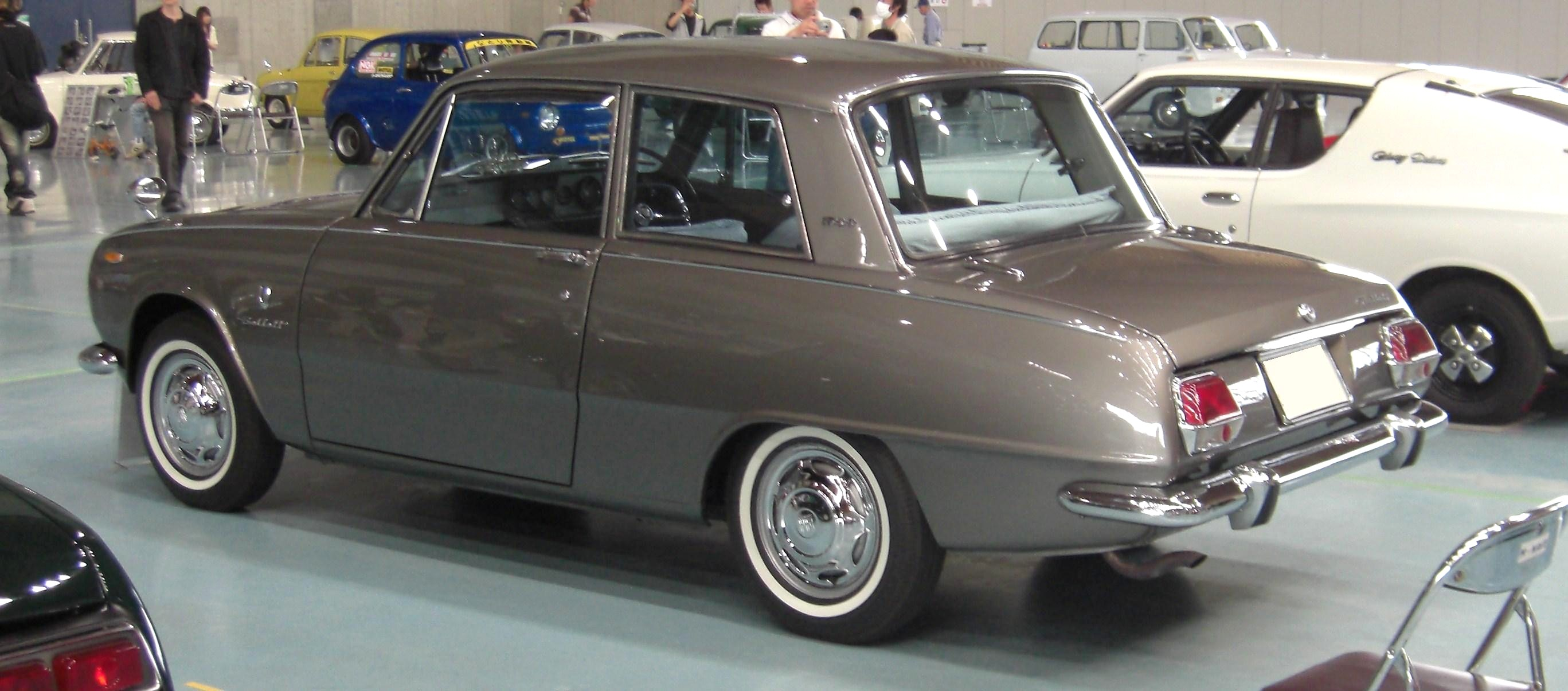
Bellett 1500 two-door sedan

The Bellett was the first Isuzu to be exported to Europe, when a thousand cars were shipped to Finland in January 1965. Isuzu entered the Swiss market after exhibiting at the 1965 Geneva Salon. The Finnish importer also marketed Alfa Romeos and Jaguars, and it accordingly used racing as their main advertising method. The Isuzu Bellett was the first Japanese car to be regularly imported to Sweden. Between 1963 and 1967, the Bellett was also imported in limited numbers to the West Coast of the United States and Hawaii by Trans-Alpac Corporation. Exports to Canada also started in March 1965 as well and production of Belletts in Canada began in 1968.

A 1.6-litre sedan line was assembled in New Zealand by Campbell Industries at Thames from 1968 to 1970. Initial production featured a silver grille and squared tail lamps; a facelift brought a new black grille and longer, rectangular tail lamps. The car was imported under '300 club' rules which encouraged assembly of up to 300 units a year, using as many locally made parts as possible. Isuzu car assembly stopped after GM took its stake; the next Isuzu to be built and sold in New Zealand was the 1977 Gemini, marketed by GMNZ as an Isuzu rather than a Holden as in Australia.

The Bellett was assembled under license by Francisco Motors Corporation in Las Piñas, Philippines from 1965 to 1974.

=== Bellett B ===
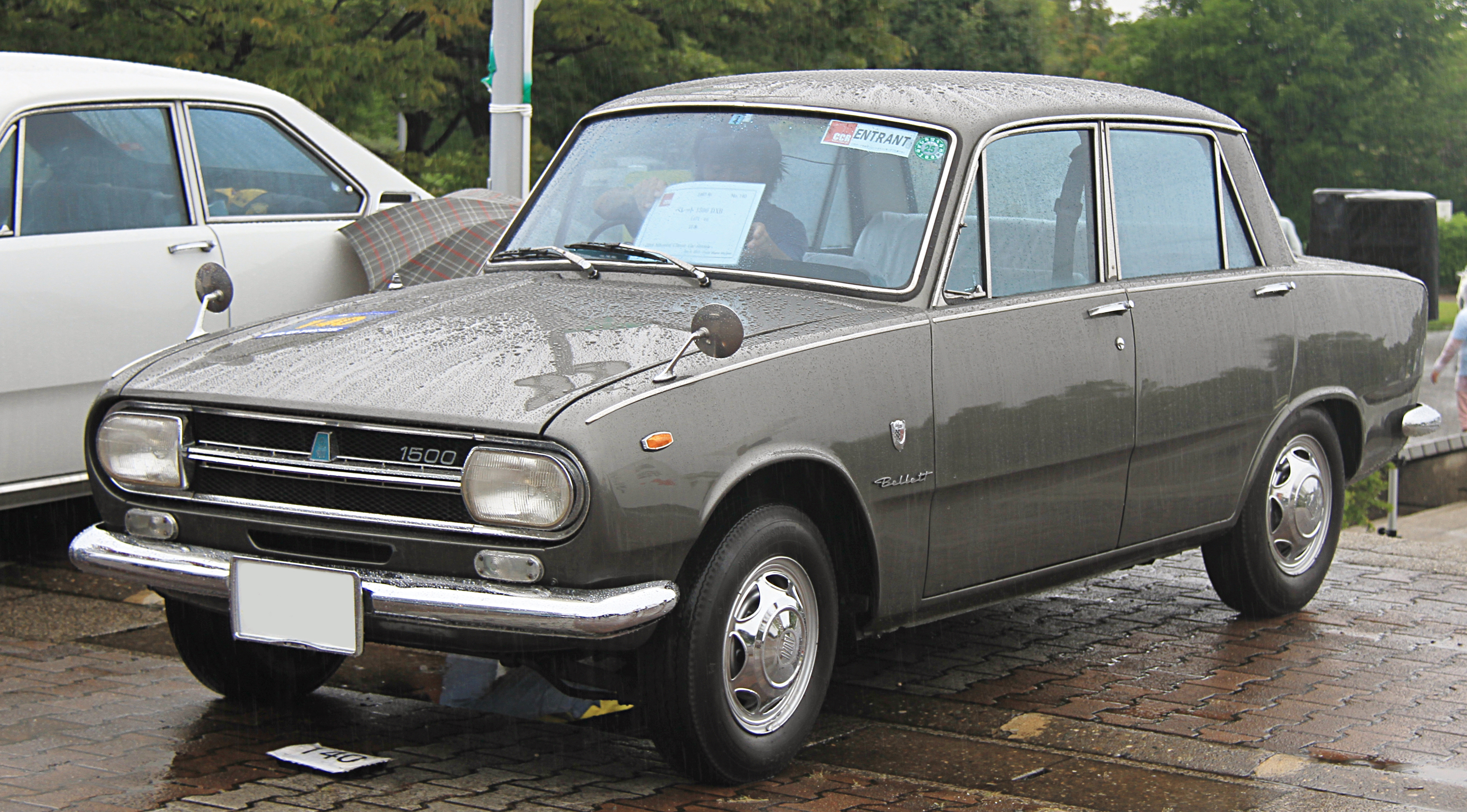
1967 Isuzu Bellett B

Introduced in November 1966 the Bellett B line was a simplified version with its own rear bodywork and larger luggage space, especially for commercial (mainly taxi) use. The B had a live rear axle with semi-elliptic leaf springs, which was cheaper and took up less space than the regular Bellett's independent rear suspension. The rear doors were the same as for the regular Bellett, but the section behind that was more squared in design, with rounded wheel openings and a reverse rake of the rear panel rather than the forward sloping design of the private use Bellett. Originally equipped with the 1.3-litre gasoline engine or the 1.8 diesel, a 1.5-litre engine which ran on LPG was added later in the year. This unit had 63 PS (46 kW) rather than the 72 of the regular G150. Another visual difference was the use of wide rectangular headlights rather than twin round units. A down-specced private use version called the "Bellett Special", using the 1.3-litre engine and the B's front clip, albeit with two-door sedan bodywork, was added in 1969. The Bellett B's suspension was also used for the larger Florian, which appeared in 1967.

=== GT ===
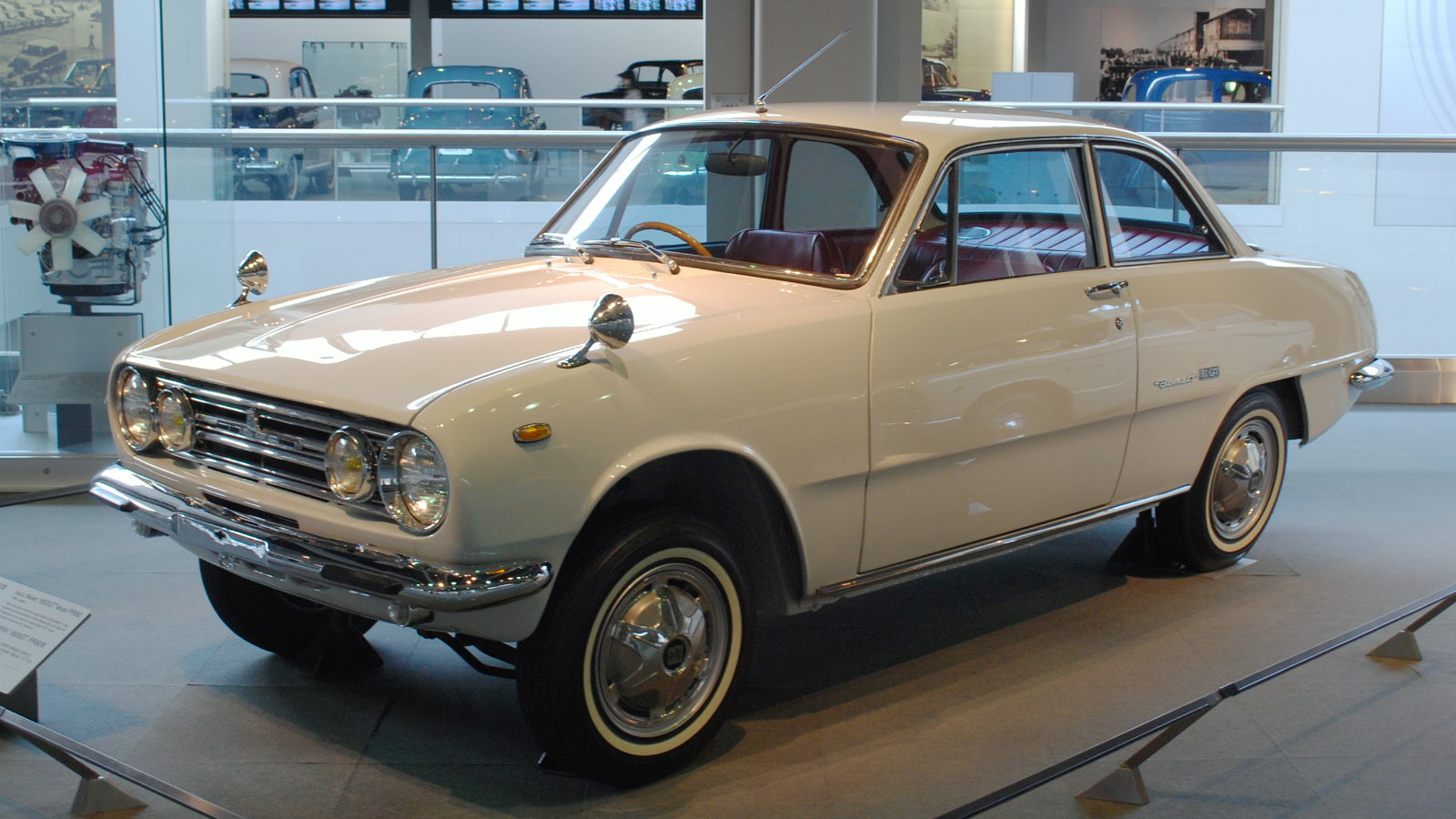
1966 Isuzu Bellett GT

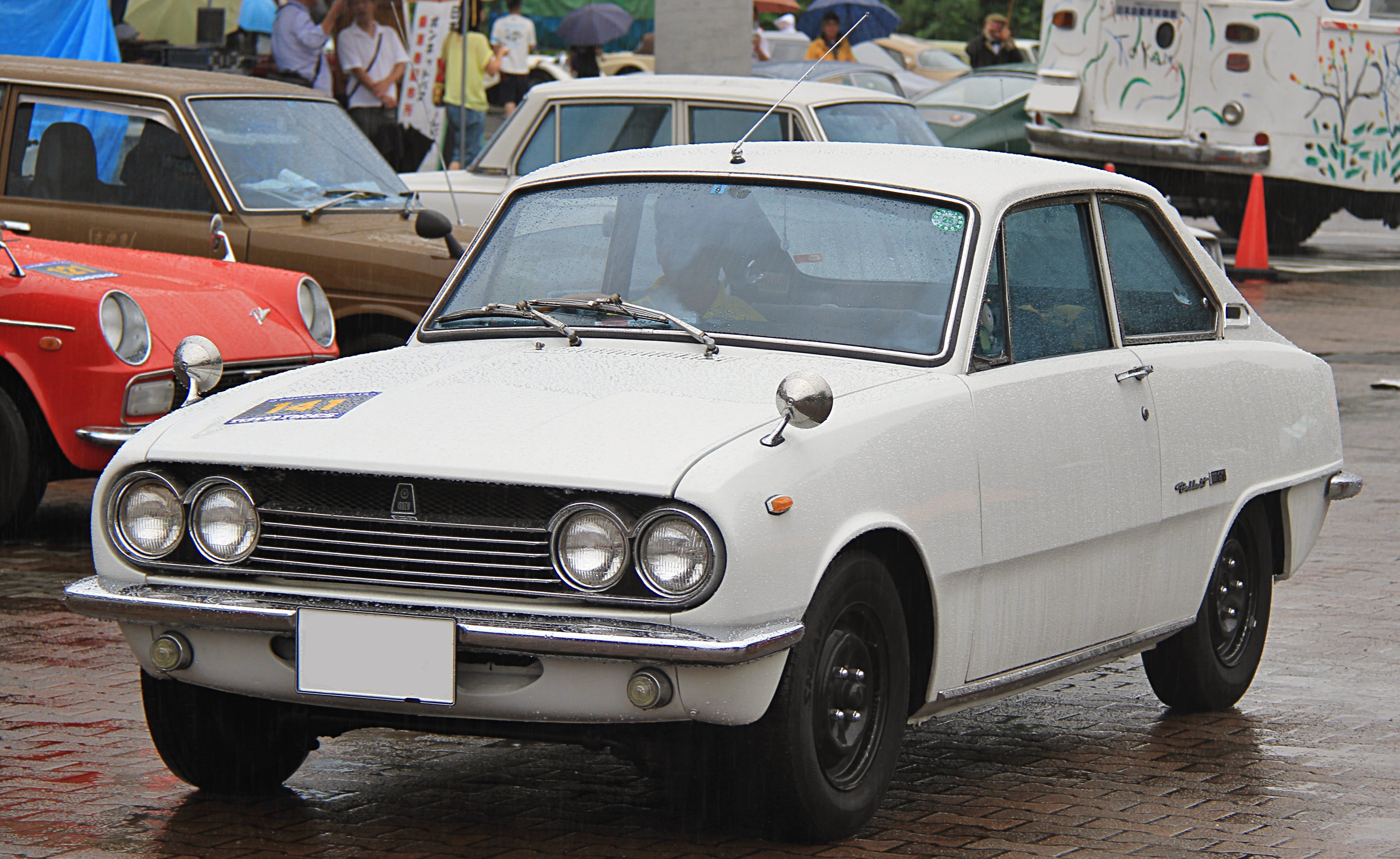
1967 Isuzu Bellett GT Fastback

The Isuzu Bellett GT', launched in April 1964, was a two-door coupé with a 40 mm (1.6 in) lower height than the sedan, fitted with a twin-carbureted 1.6 L OHV gasoline engine. It was the first Japanese car to be billed "GT" (Gran Turismo). September 1964 saw the arrival of a 1.5 L version of the GT, front disc brakes and some slight modifications to the front fascia. In late 1966 the SOHC 1.6-litre G161 engine with 90 PS (66 kW; 89 hp) was introduced, a little after the April addition of a fastback body style.

In 1969 the base engine's power was increased to 95 PS (70 kW; 94 hp), when the GT-R was also added, and in 1970 it was joined by a 1.8 L SOHC engine. There was also a 1500 Sport (1966), essentially a GT but with the two-door sedan bodywork. This was turned into the 1600 Sport in 1968, with the G161 SOHC engine. The 1600 GT was complemented by the 115 PS (85 kW; 113 hp) 1800 GT in 1970, and after the 1971 facelift the down-tuned 1800 GTN ("N" for Normal) with 100 PS (74 kW; 99 hp) was added.

=== GT-R ===
The GT-R, more specifically GT Type-R (for "racing"), was a racing version of the GT, also available to individual customers. First presented in September 1969, the GT-R featured a 1.6 L DOHC engine from the 117 Coupé, power brakes and numerous other modifications. Available only with two-door notchback coupé bodywork It was visually different from other Belletts primarily by a specific paint scheme, which included a completely black hood. The GT-R achieved many successes in racing. Only about 1,400 GT-Rs were manufactured.

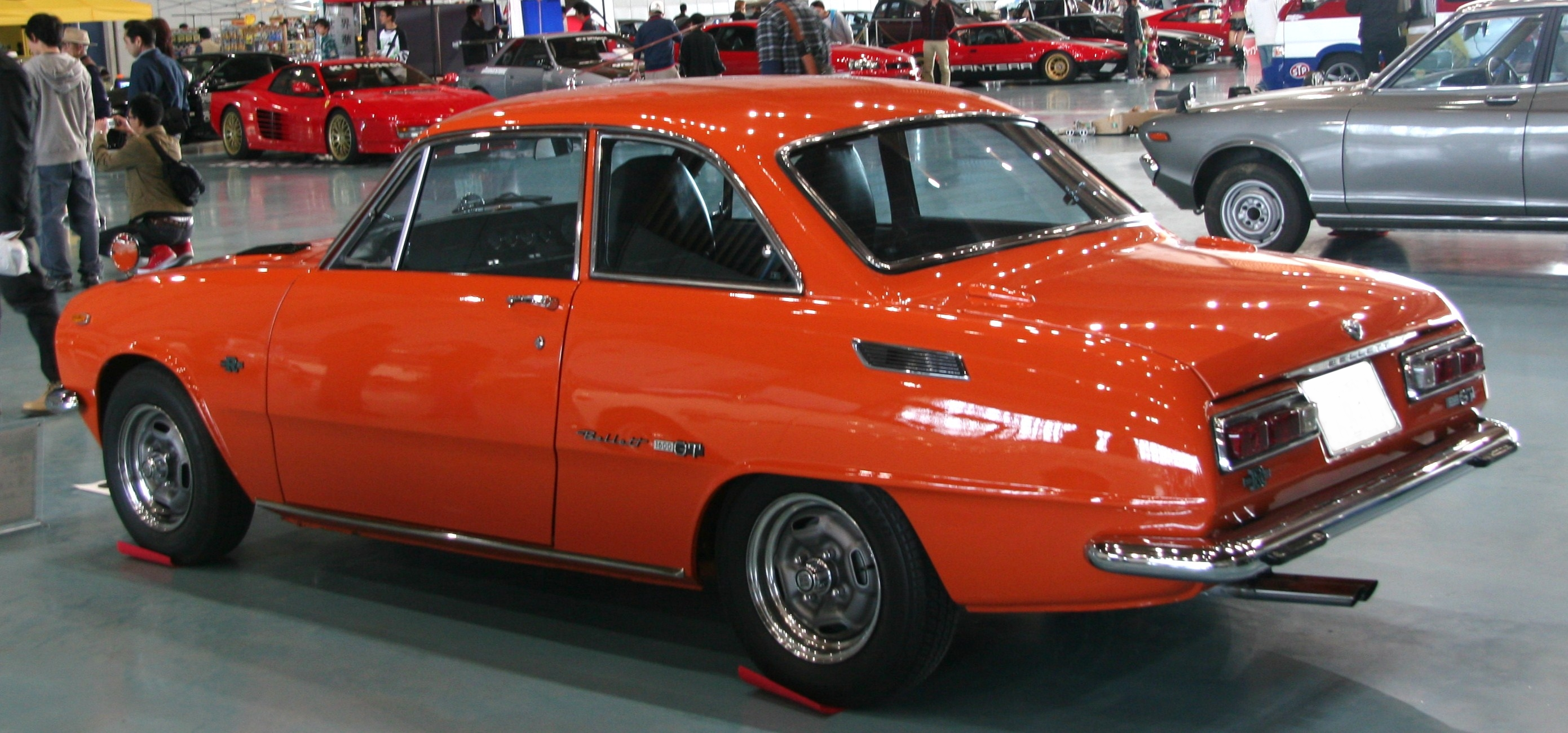
1970 Bellett GT-R

In 2006, readers of Japanese collector car magazine Nostalgic Hero ranked the Bellett GT-R 10th in a list of the 50 greatest Japanese cars. Results were published in issue 116 (August 2006) as well as a Nostalgic Hero Extra Edition (Geibun Mooks No. 555) published April 20, 2007. The 1969 Bellett GT-R is a playable car in the Polyphony Digital video game Gran Turismo 4 for the PlayStation 2, and also in Gran Turismo for PSP, Gran Turismo 5 and Gran Turismo 6 for the PlayStation 3.

== Wasp ==
A coupe utility variant, the Isuzu Wasp, was introduced in 1963. It featured an all-steel box-chassis and body frame, and was produced in pickup and flatbed body styles. The Wasp was offered with the 1325 cc G130 gasoline engine and the 1764 cc C180 diesel engine. The 1500 cc Bellett engine was also offered on some export models, including the entire Australian shipment of 122 units which were all offered with a bench seat, 1500 cc Bellett motor and in a choice of trayback or styleside options. The Wasp's tiny cabin meant sales were slow in Australia and it took three years to sell what had been intended as an initial batch.

The Wasp was built until 1972, when it was replaced by the Faster, known as the Chevrolet LUV in many markets.

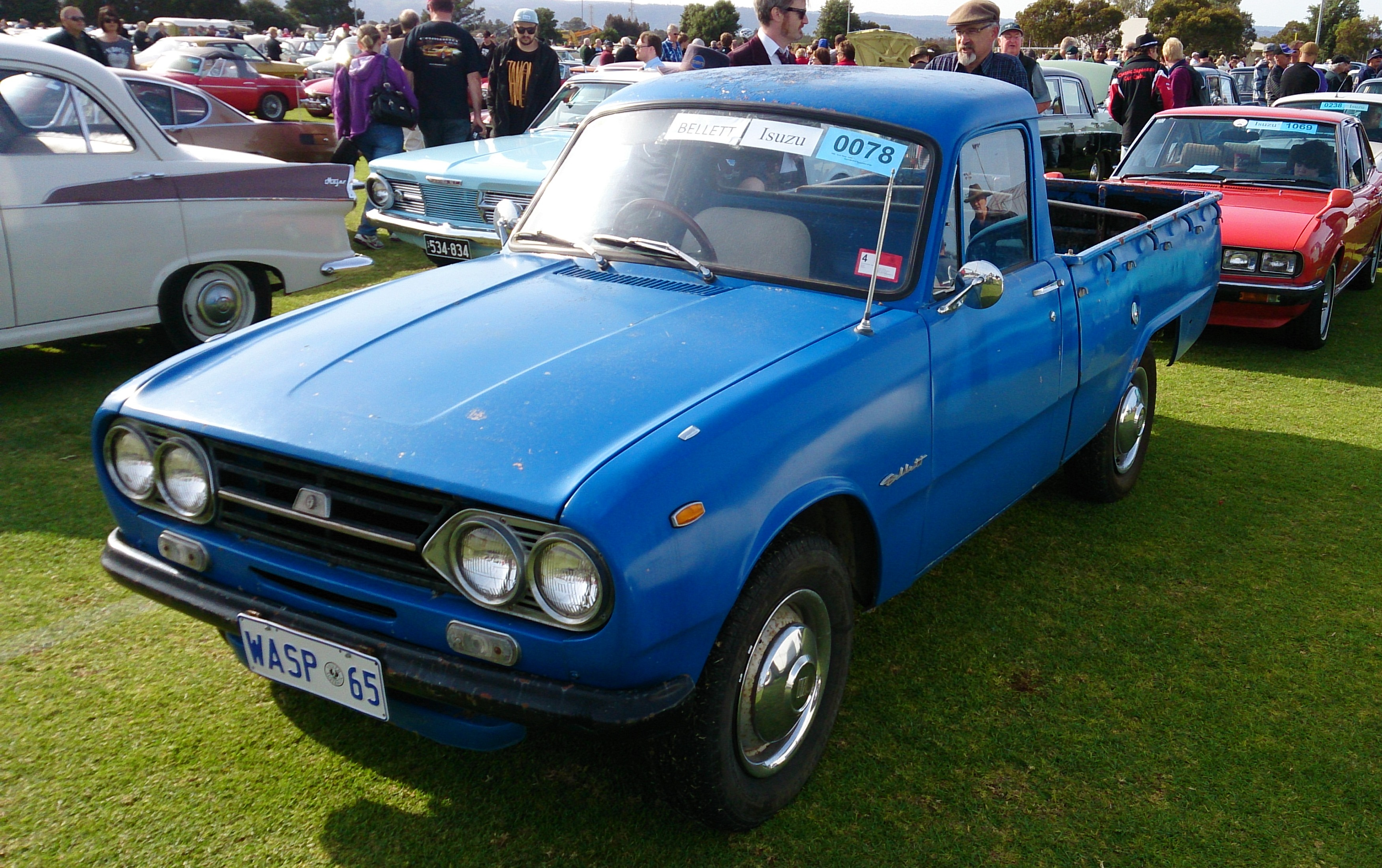
1965 Isuzu Wasp pickup

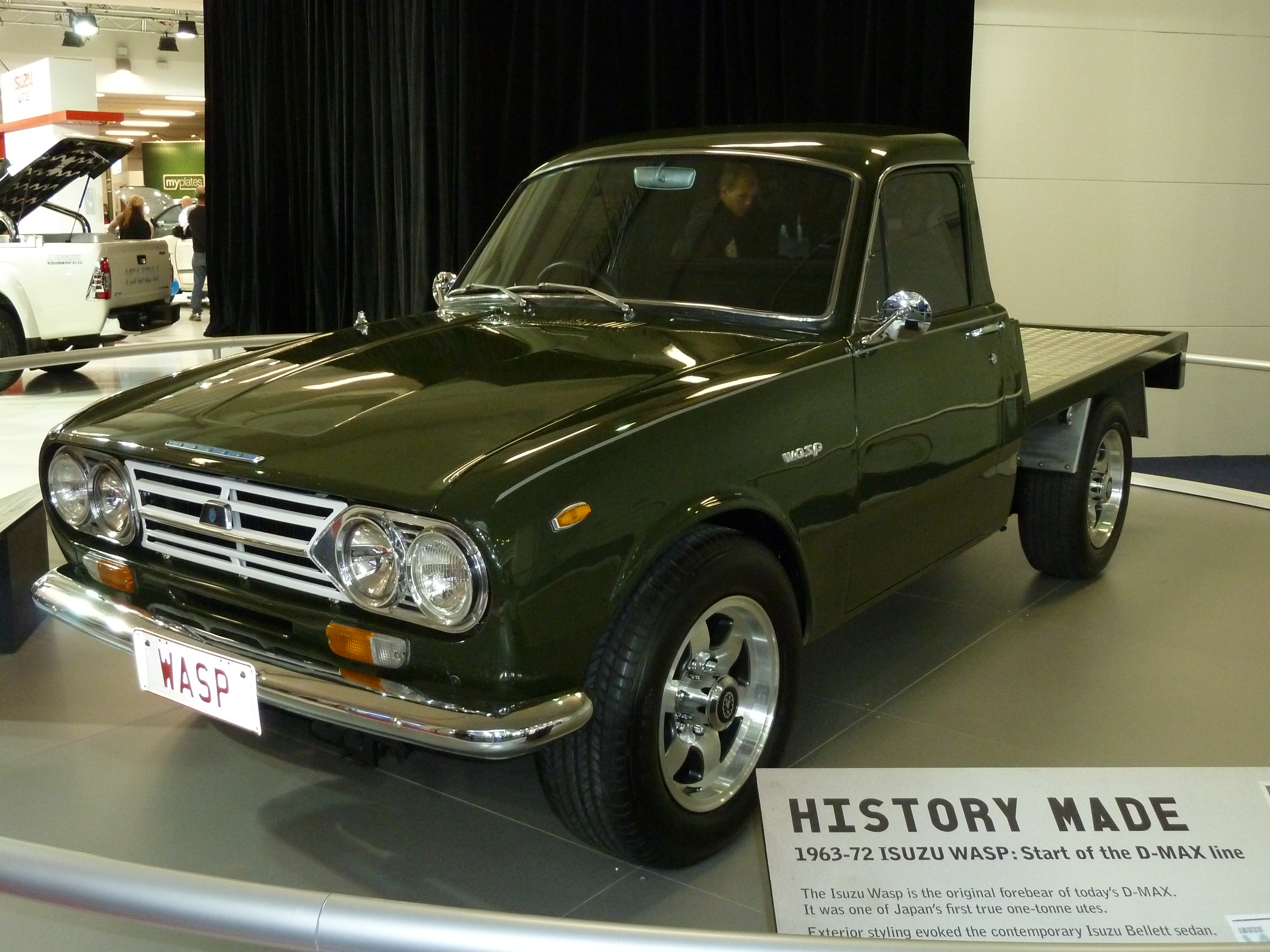
Isuzu Wasp (KR20) cab chassis (with non-standard wheels)

== Competition ==
As part of Isuzu's advertising effort in Finland, rallies and car orienteering events were entered. A Group 2-tuned four-door Bellett surprised many European commentators by finishing a "sensational" tenth in the 1966 1000 Lakes Rally.

== MX1600 ==
At the 1969 Tokyo Motor Show, Isuzu presented a concept car called Isuzu Bellett MX1600, designed by Tom Tjaarda. It was a mid-engined, rear-wheel drive two-seater super sports car. Apart from sharing the 1.6 L engine with the GT-R, the MX1600 had little to do with any production Bellett, and it never materialized into a production vehicle, but it is said to have inspired the De Tomaso Pantera by the same stylist.
