= 117 =

117 may refer to:

- 117 (number), the natural number following 116 and preceding 118
- AD 117
- 117 BC
- 117 (emergency telephone number)
- 117 (TFL bus)
- 117 (New Jersey bus)
- 117°, a 1998 album by Izzy Stradlin
- 117 Lomia, a main-belt asteroid
- Isuzu 117 Coupé, a fastback coupé

== See also ==
- List of highways numbered 117
- Tennessine, synthetic chemical element with atomic number 117
- 11/7 (disambiguation)
- 17 (disambiguation)
- B117 (disambiguation)
- F-117 (disambiguation)
- John-117, the 'Master Chief,' a fictional supersoldier from the Halo series.
