= 7-Eleven (disambiguation) =

7-Eleven is an international chain of convenience stores.

7-Eleven, 7/11 or 07-11 may also refer to:

- Seven-Eleven, a dice game whose name have inspired a play on words in many other names
- July 11
  - 2006 Mumbai train bombings also known as 11/7 and 7/11
- Montgomery 7-11, an American sailing dinghy that has a length overall of 7' 11"
- November 7
- 7-Eleven (cycling team), a professional road-racing team 1981–1996
- "7/11" (song), a song by Beyoncé
- "7-11", a song by the Ramones from Pleasant Dreams
- "7-11", a song by Eskimo Disco featuring the characters from Pingu
- "Seven Eleven", a song by GE & GM from A Bugged Out Mix
- "7-eleven", a song by Black Midi, released as a single and as a bonus track on the Japanese release of their 2019 album Schlagenheim.

== See also ==
- 711 (disambiguation)
- 11/7 (disambiguation)
- 117 (disambiguation)
- Blackjack, featuring the 7-11-21 rule
