= 711 =

711 may refer to:

- 711 (number), a natural number
- AD 711, a year of the 8th century AD
- 711 BC, a year of the 8th century BC
- 7-1-1, the telephone number of the Telecommunications Relay Service in the United States and Canada
- 7-Eleven, a chain of convenience stores
- 711 (Quality Comics), a comics superhero
- George Washington's code number in the Revolutionary War Culper Ring
- 0711, the area code for Stuttgart in Baden-Württemberg, Germany
- March 711, a Formula One racing car

== See also ==
- List of highways numbered 711
- 7-Eleven (disambiguation)
