= Isuzu Hillman Minx =

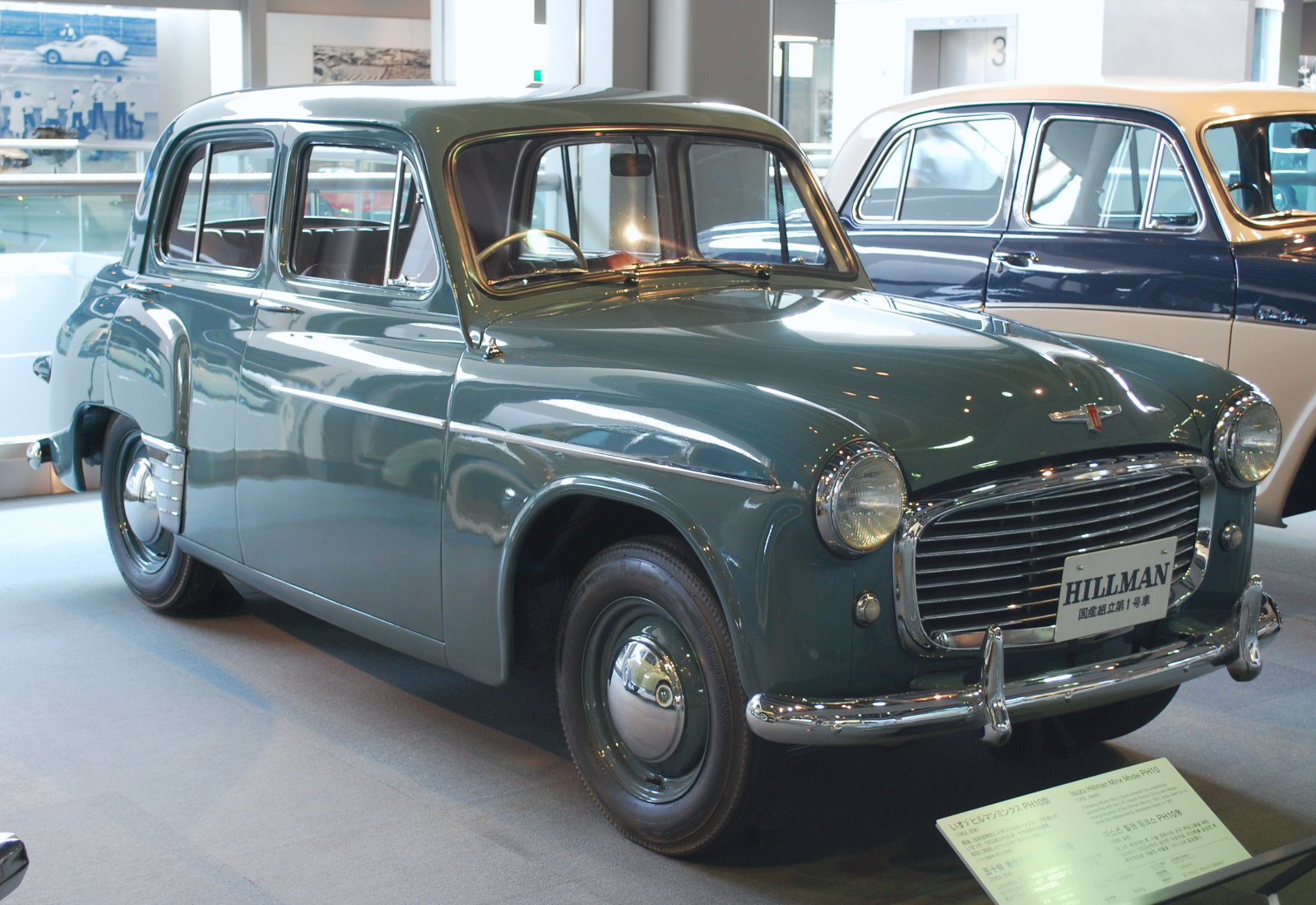
- 1953 Isuzu Hillman Minx (PH10)

Overview
- Manufacturer: Isuzu
- Production: 1953–1964
- Assembly: Japan: Kawasaki, Kanagawa (Kawasaki Plant)

Body and chassis
- Body style: 4 door sedan
- Related: Hillman Minx

Powertrain
- Engine: 4 cyl sidevalve 1265 cc
- Transmission: 4 speed column shift

Chronology
- Successor: Isuzu Bellett

The Isuzu Hillman Minx was a series of middle-sized family cars produced by Isuzu in Japan under licence from the Rootes Group, between 1953 and 1964. The models were broadly equivalent to the Hillman Minx Mark VI to Mk VIII and Series 1 to Series 3A produced at the same time in the UK, although some notable divergence occurred in the later years as production became localised in Japan.

== Isuzu’s early history ==
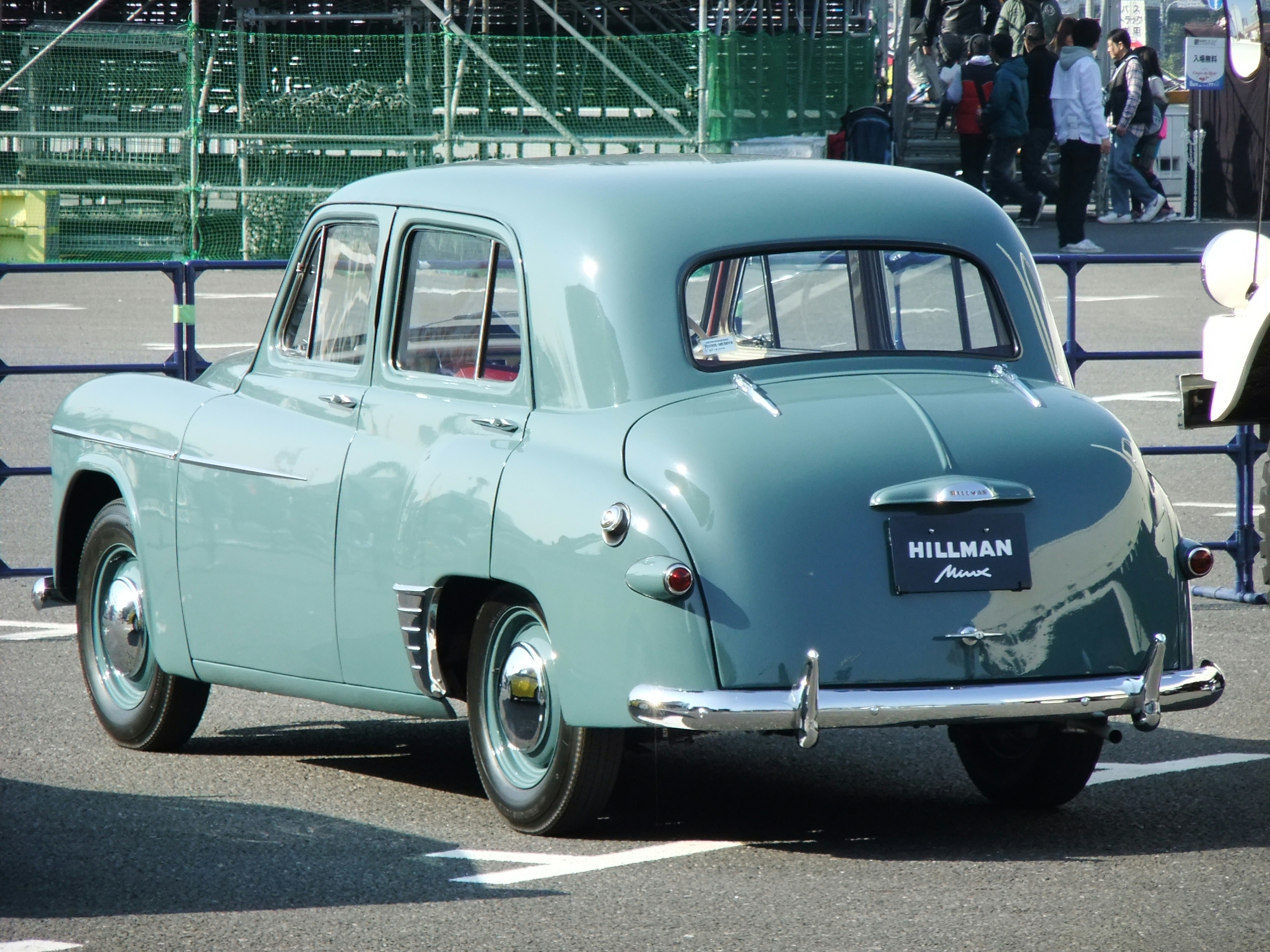
Isuzu Hillman Minx (PH10)

Isuzu traces its history back to the Tokyo Ishikawajima Shipbuilding & Engineering Co., Ltd. which was established in 1893. In 1918, this company entered into an agreement with the British automaker Wolseley Motor Ltd. In 1922, Tokyo Ishikawajima Shipbuilding & Engineering localized production of the Wolseley A9 - the first passenger car ever made in Japan. During the 1930s "Tokyo Automobile Industries" was formed and in 1949 the company name was changed to Isuzu Motors.

== The Japanese post-war car industry ==
After World War 2, car companies from Western countries were anxious to sell vehicles in Japan. By April 1952 six companies – Rootes, Renault, Standard, Opel, Fiat and Chrysler - had conducted Japanese market research studies. In June 1952 the Japanese Ministry of International Trade and Industry (MITI) issued a policy regarding the entry of foreign manufacturers. MITI stated that it would allow foreign firms to enter the market only through technical agreements with existing local "chassis makers". They also stated that smaller European cars were more suited to Japan than larger American ones. MITI also controlled the amount of foreign currency that could be spent on auto imports and said they would only allocate enough to allow 1200 cars per manufacturer (per annum).

MITI released a further policy statement in October 1952 which provided:

- Foreign capital for sales operations was not permitted.
- Foreign capital for production was allowed if it contributed to local industry development.
- Remittance of royalties and patent fees was guaranteed.
- Within 5 years of a technology agreement being signed, 90% of parts were to be produced domestically.
- Manufacturing rights for foreign cars must be transferred to domestic companies.
- The importation of raw materials not produced in Japan was permitted.

MITI were basically forced to develop these policies after both Rootes and Chrysler had applied to set up car manufacturing arrangements earlier in 1952. Rootes' first proposal was to set up their own CKD factory, which was opposed by MITI. Rootes then proposed an agreement with Ikegai Motors by which Rootes would import parts, Ikegai would assemble them and then Rootes would sell the vehicles. MITI rejected this too and finally Rootes entered into an agreement with Isuzu – under terms set by MITI.

== The Isuzu-Rootes technical agreement ==
While there were doubtless many fine details, the broad terms of the agreement were:

- Isuzu received the sole rights to import all types of vehicles made by Rootes.
- Isuzu acquired the right to build Hillman Minx cars and Commer delivery vans – beginning with CKD assembly and moving to domestic production.
- Isuzu would pay £25 royalties for each car (after the first 2,000).
- Isuzu would also pay Rootes £50,000. However, Rootes would not remit this money to Britain but use it (along with a slightly larger sum contributed by Isuzu) to establish a sales and service network in Japan. Profits from that network were also not to be remitted to Britain.
- After 5 years, the agreement could be terminated with 1 years notice – if not terminated it would remain in force for 25 years.

== Local assembly starts – PH10 to PH12 models ==
On 28 October 1953 the first Isuzu built Hillman Minx rolled off the assembly line at Isuzu's new Ōmori factory. Known in Japan as the PH10 model, these were basically the normal Mk VI Hillman Minx; 1265 cc side-valve motor, column shift manual gearbox etc. They were assembled from knock-down kits. The Isuzu Hillman Minx was sold through the Japanese Yamato Motor Company from 12 November 1953.

Rootes UK updated the Hillman Minx every year, usually releasing a new model late in the year. Thus the Mk VI was released in November 1953 to be sold as the 1954 model; then, the Mk VI was revised and became the Mk VII late in 1954. Isuzu followed a similar path, and the PH10 was replaced by the PH11 (Mk VII Minx) model in August 1954. The PH11 was replaced by the PH12 (Mk VIII Minx) in February 1955. Rootes introduced a new 1390 cc overhead valve motor with the Hillman Mk VIII, and this was also used in the Isuzu built PH12.

The PH10 to PH12 models were very much sold as Hillmans. The contemporary marketing brochures appear to be Japanese language versions of English ones; the illustrations are of people who are clearly western rather than Japanese in appearance, and terms like ‘Gay Look’ (for two tone colour schemes) were carried over from UK marketing. From contemporary advertising brochures it seems that (at least for the PH11 and 12 models) four body styles were available: a four-door sedan, two-door convertible, the two-door Californian coupé and a two-door estate. It seems probable that only the four-door sedan was built in Japan and that the other types would have been fully imported (if any at all were actually sold).

== The path to full local production ==
Under the terms of the technical agreement, Isuzu had to move from assembly of imported parts towards local production. At the start (October 1953) only about 6% of the car's value was Japanese - tyres, tubes and batteries were local and the cars were painted locally. By October 1954 about 18% of the car was produced locally. In 1955 MITI began to think that Isuzu was not moving quickly enough to localise production, apparently suspecting that Rootes was deliberately causing delays. This may have been unfair – Rootes were planning two major changes to the Minx (a new engine, then a completely new body) and it would have made no sense for Isuzu to tool up for local production of the old engine and body.

However, MITI controlled the amount of foreign currency (needed by Isuzu to pay for the CKD parts). With Isuzu, MITI developed a schedule for moving to complete local production. By November 1955 local production had risen to 30%. In August 1956, when the engine and gearbox joined the list of parts locally produced, it had risen to 50%. During 1957 the major body components were built locally taking the percentage to 100. On 28 October 1957, four years to the day after the first Isuzu-Hillman rolled off the CKD line, the first completely Japanese made Hillman was completed.

== The Audax Isuzu-Hillmans ==
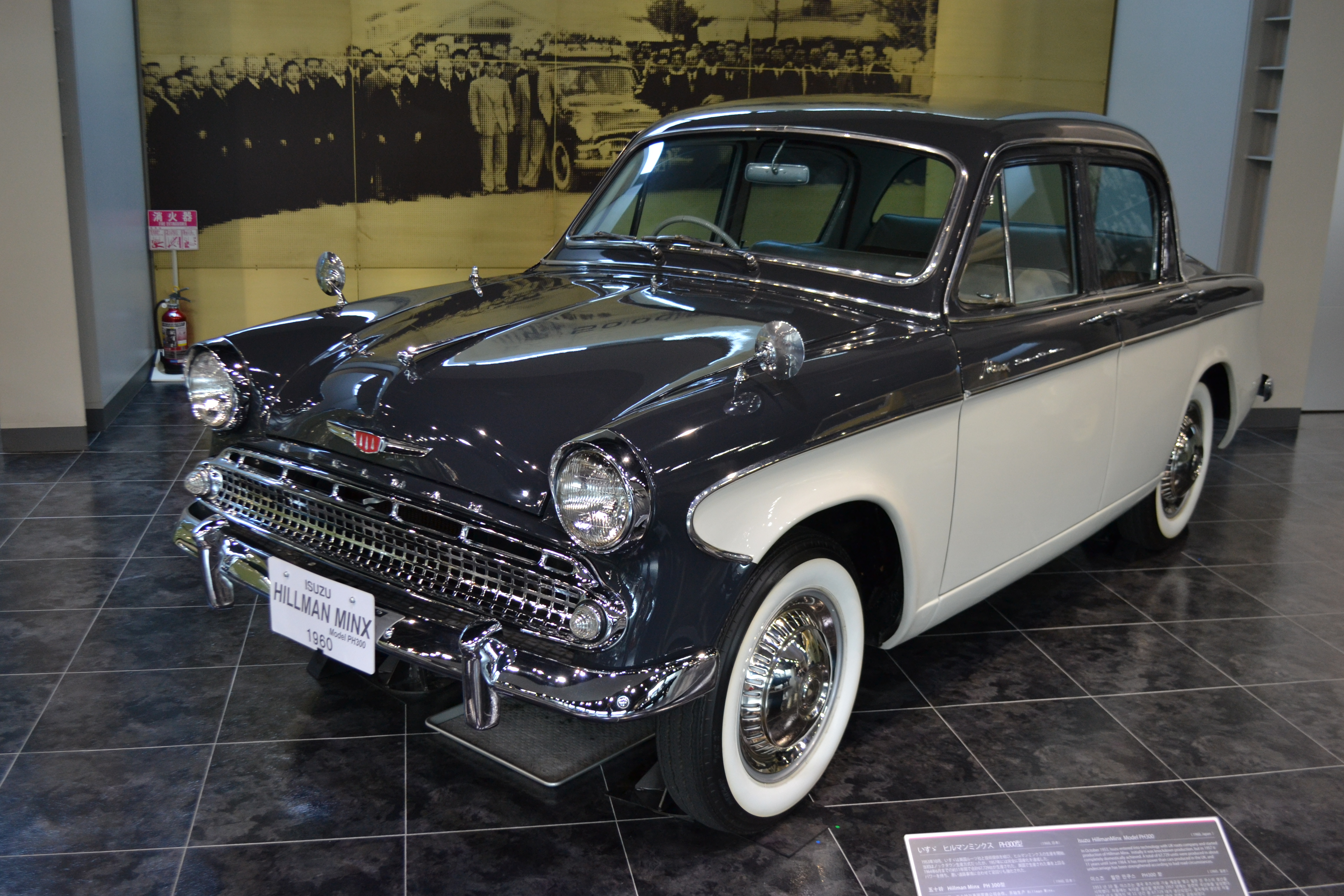
1960 Isuzu Hillman Minx Super Deluxe (PH300)

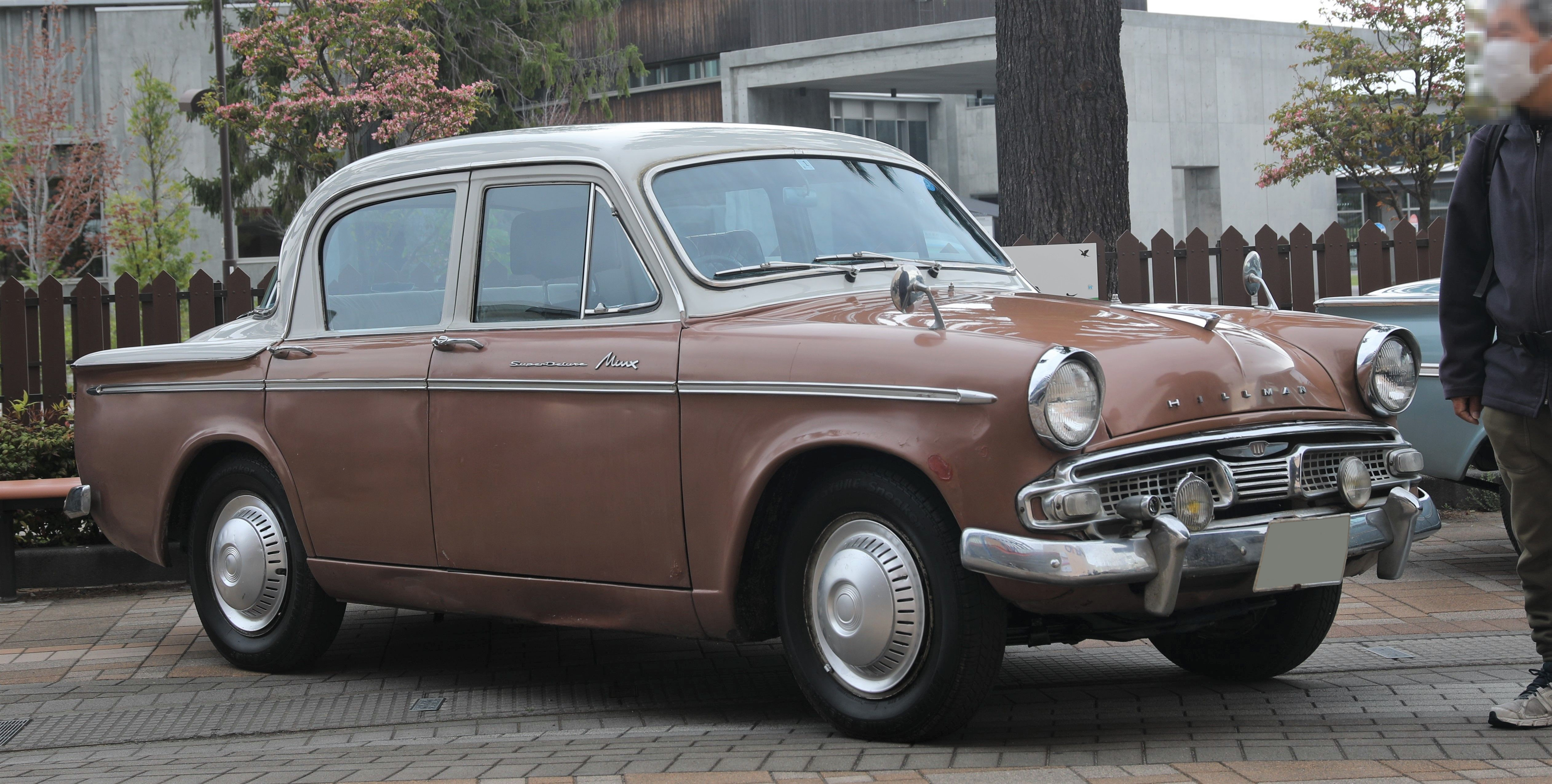
Isuzu Hillman Minx Super Deluxe (PH400)

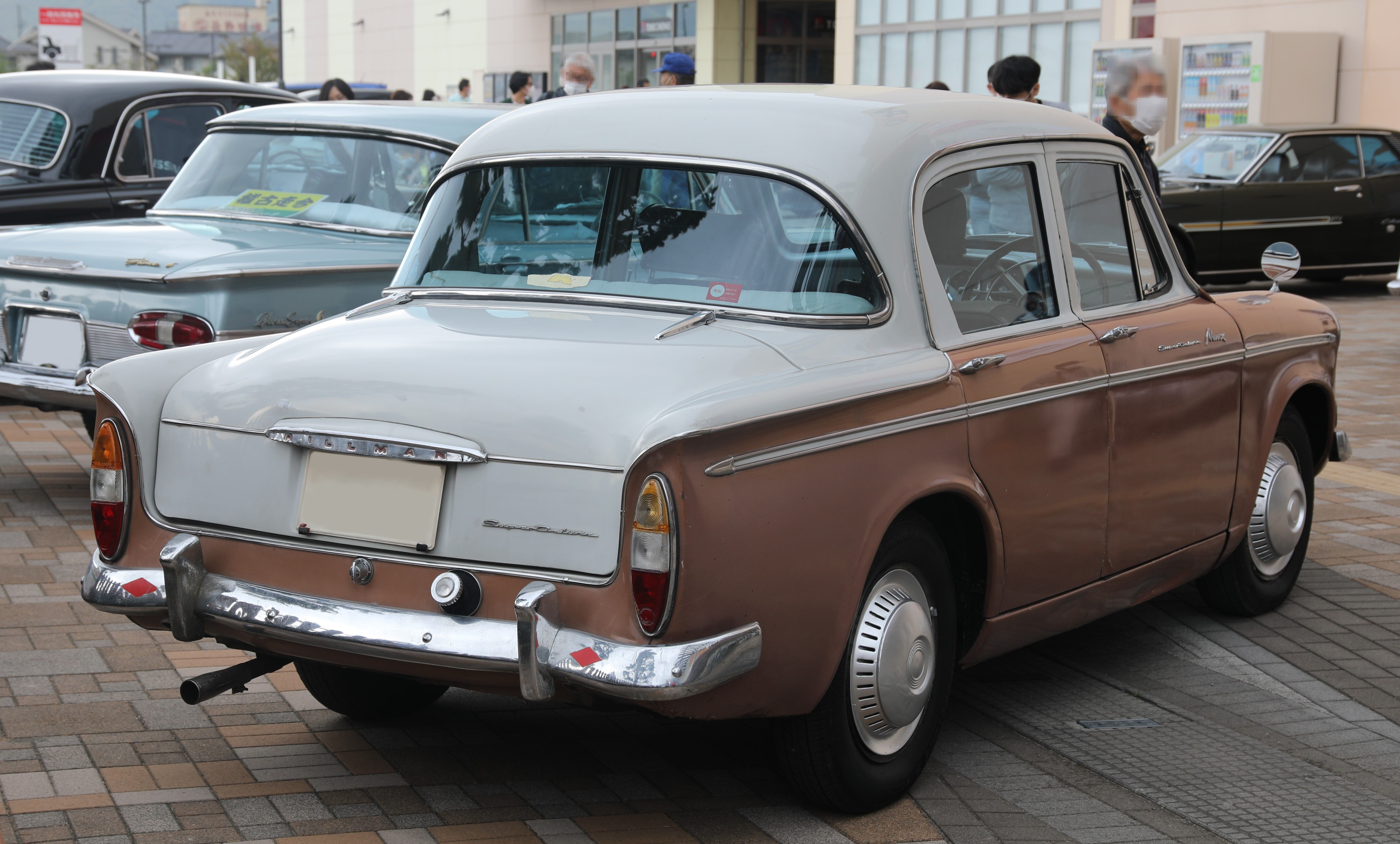
Isuzu Hillman Minx Super Deluxe (PH400)

In 1956, Rootes UK released the new Audax series Minx – a completely new body which carried over a few mechanical components, such as the OHV motor, from the previous Mk VIII. This new model was also built by Isuzu – as the PH100, released on 19 September 1956.

In January 1958 Isuzu introduced a new model, the "Super Deluxe", at a higher price than the Minx. Then in March 1958 they introduced a more basic "Standard" model (designated PH50), at a lower price. The Standard model replaced the ‘mid-range’ Minx, leaving Isuzu with Standard and Super Deluxe Models. Then in August 1958 the range was face-lifted to resemble the Series 2 Hillman Minx (this model was designated the PH200. At the same time, power was increased from 46–50 bhp (34–37 kW; 47–51 PS) in the Minx and to 55 bhp (41 kW; 56 PS) in the Super Deluxe. The car was also now rated to carry six passengers instead of five.

In October 1959 the Isuzu Minx was face-lifted again to resemble the UK Series 3 Hillman Minx (model designation PH300). At this same time it gained the enlarged (1494 cc) motor. There were now two versions of the engine; the Standard with 60 bhp (45 kW; 61 PS) (7.5:1 compression ratio) and the Super Deluxe (62 bhp (46 kW; 63 PS), 8.5:1 CR). They were face-lifted again in October 1960 (model PH 400) to resemble the Minx Series 3A - except that the Japanese models retained the smaller windshield from the earlier Minx. There were further minor revisions in October 1961 and October 1962. In April 1963 another minor revision was made in which power was lifted to 68 bhp (51 kW; 69 PS) (Standard) and 70 bhp (52 kW; 71 PS) (Super DeLuxe). Revisions after October 1960 were not given new model designations and continued to be called PH400. Isuzu phased out the Hillman Minx in June 1964 at which time 57,729 Isuzu Hillmans had been made.

There was very little change to the appearance of the cars from October 1960, the last model still resembling the Series 3A Minx. The Isuzu Minx retained the 1494 cc motor until the end, never receiving the 1592 cc motor that was released in the Series 3C Hillman Minx in 1962. They were fitted with 4 speed, column-shift manual transmissions and drum brakes right until the end. Nor did Isuzu ever build the revised body shape of the Series 5 Hillman (introduced by Rootes late in 1963). But while Isuzu did not change the appearance of the Minx, they did make changes to the specifications, particularly on the Super Deluxe models. These became progressively better and better equipped than their UK Minx counterparts. Initially this meant full instrumentation (including ammeter, oil pressure gauge, clock) and a radio. A lockable glovebox was added and such features as a handbrake warning light and reversing lights. Self-dipping headlights were also offered as was a boot-mounted air-conditioning system.

== The Isuzu Hillman Express Estate ==
The 1953 technical agreement with Rootes gave Isuzu the right to build and sell the "Commer delivery van". This presumably meant the Commer Express – a light commercial van that Rootes had made in the Hillman "Mark" body shape since at least 1950. It's uncertain whether Isuzu actually built a Commer van in the early years, although contemporary brochures suggest they offered the estate version of the PH11 and PH12 (Mk VII/VIII) Hillman Minx.

With the introduction of the Audax Hillman Minx in 1956, initially Rootes only produced the 4 door sedan. In 1957, Rootes UK introduced an estate version of the Audax Minx. With four doors, winding windows for the rear seat passengers, and the two-piece tailgate hinged at the top and bottom, this was much more "sedan like" than the Mark Hillman Minx estates had been. Isuzu chose not to build the Rootes estate, but to introduce its own. Known as the Hillman Express, the Isuzu estate was quite different from the Rootes UK version. It had a different roofline (more like the Mk Estate cars), two doors, sliding rear passenger windows, horizontal bars on the load-area side-windows, and a single-piece, side-opening tailgate. The front seat was also split oddly – not down the middle, but one third of the way across, on the driver's side. Factory brochures show clearly that Isuzu marketed the Express as a multi-purpose vehicle: delivery van during the week, family estate at the weekend.

Information on other websites suggests that the Express was introduced in 1962, but the 1960 Isuzu Hillman brochure features the Express. Elsewhere on the web, scanned brochures clearly show the Express model with PH200 (Minx Series 2) styling (7). Thus, the first Express was probably first released in August 1958 with the PH200 facelift. The Express was equipped with the low-compression engine used in the Standard Minx and had the model designations PT100/200/300.

== The end of Isuzu Minx production - and the cars which replaced it ==
Rootes had tried in 1961 and 1962 to further extend the period that Isuzu were to build Hillmans cars. They were apparently optimistic about the possibility of the market being ‘liberalised’, which would have allowed them to sell fully imported cars through the established dealer network (which they owned about half of). Rootes was even prepared to forgo their royalties – but the deal didn't happen in the end. This was undoubtedly because Isuzu was moving to produce its own cars.

The first of these - the Isuzu Bellel - was introduced on 11 April 1961. The Bellel was a conventional four-door sedan which certainly owed little to the Minx in terms of styling (it was similar to contemporary Farina designs like the Fiat 2300). Larger and heavier (1,190 kg (2,624 lb)), and equipped with a 2-litre (1991 cc) engine, the new Isuzu was a size above the Minx and did not replace it.

The true Minx replacement was the Isuzu Bellett. Introduced in June 1963, the Bellett was actually slightly smaller than the Minx, and the styling was much more low-slung. The Bellett was available in "Standard", "DeLuxe" and "Sport" variants, with both 2- and 4-door bodies and came with a 1471 cc petrol motor or an 1800 cc diesel. At the same time Isuzu released the Bellett Express estate with 1300 cc and 1500 cc engines. The Bellett Express, while looking completely different from the Hillman Express, had similar features like two doors, a side hinged tailgate, and sliding rear passenger windows. Isuzu did not drop the Minx as soon as the Bellett was introduced; they continued to produce it until June 1964.
