= B117 (disambiguation) =

B117 most often refers to B.1.1.7, a variant of COVID-19 virus SARS-CoV-2.

B117 may also refer to:

- B. 117, a musical composition by Dvořák
- ASTM B117, a corrosion standard
- Blériot 117 (B-117), a 1920s airplane

== See also ==
- Lockheed F-117 Nighthawk, a fighter-bomber
- BOLT-117, a laser-guided bomb
- 117 (disambiguation)
- B17 (disambiguation)
