= Isuzu Florian =

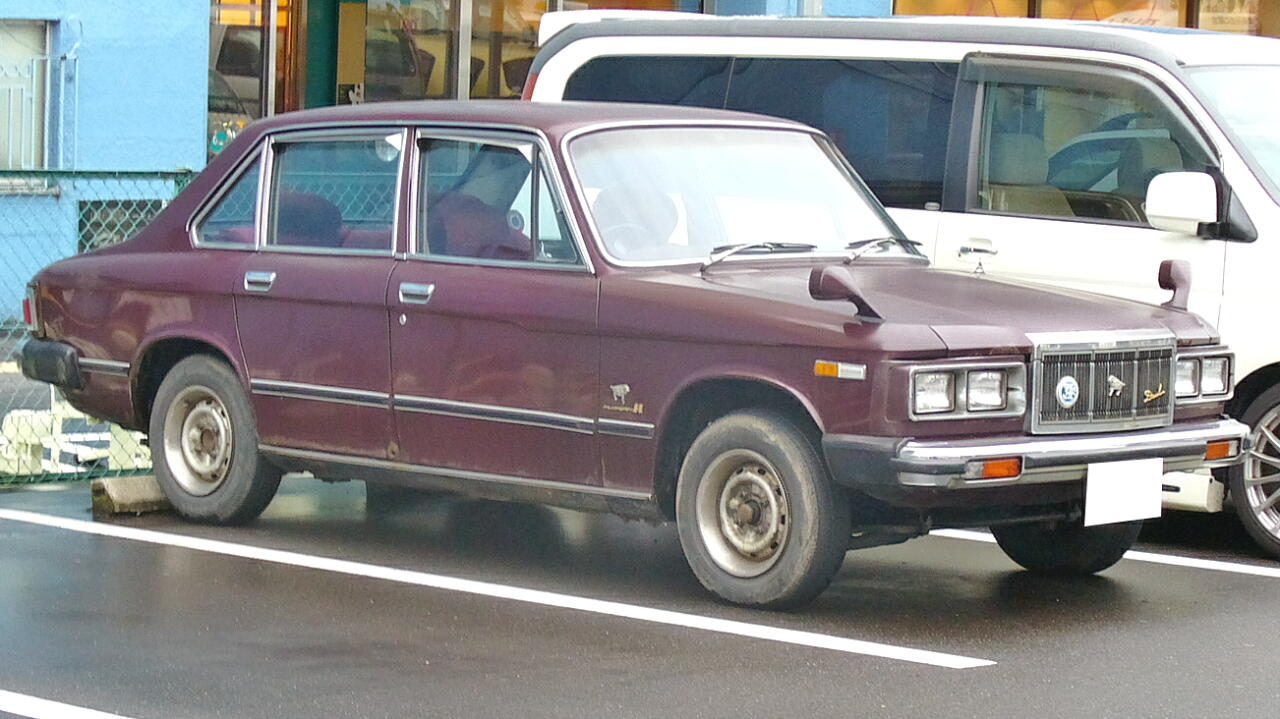
- Isuzu Florian Series II

Overview
- Manufacturer: Isuzu
- Also called: Isuzu Florian E/T/V
- Production: 1967–1983
- Assembly: Japan: Fujisawa, Kanagawa (Fujisawa Plant)

Body and chassis
- Class: Mid-size / large family car
- Body style: 4-door sedan 5-door station wagon
- Layout: Front-engine, rear-wheel drive
- Related: Isuzu 117 Coupé; Isuzu KB

Powertrain
- Engine: 1.6 L G161 OHV I4 (PA20); 1.6 L G161S OHC I4 (PA20); 1.8 L G180 OHC I4 (PA30); 2.0 L C190 diesel I4 (PAD30)
- Transmission: 3/4/5-speed manual 3-speed automatic

Dimensions
- Wheelbase: 2,500 mm (98.4 in)
- Length: 4,430 mm (174.4 in)
- Width: 1,620 mm (63.8 in)
- Height: 1,445 mm (56.9 in)
- Curb weight: 1,345 kg (2,965 lb)

Chronology
- Predecessor: Isuzu Bellel
- Successor: Isuzu Aska

The Isuzu Florian is an intermediate class car manufactured by Isuzu in Japan from November 1967 until 1983. The Florian's body remained essentially the same through its unusually long life cycle, being afforded only two moderate facelifts. The Isuzu Florian (Project 117) was originally presented as the Ghia Isuzu 117 Sedan at the 1966 Tokyo Motor Show and shared its complete chassis with the closely related Isuzu 117 Coupé. Originally available only with a 1.6 liter gasoline inline-four engine (1600 Deluxe) producing 84 PS (62 kW) at 5200 rpm, a 1.8 liter version was later added as was a diesel option, first seen in 1977.

== History ==
The Florian saloon, competing in the intermediate class that included the Toyota Mark II, Mazda Luce, and the Nissan Laurel, was first shown at the 1967 Tokyo Motor Show. The Florian 1600 Deluxe (PA20) led a somewhat uneasy existence as the top-of-the line Isuzu at the time of introduction, as its single carburetted overhead valve G161 engine was no more than a downtuned version of the unit which lived under the hood of the more affordable Bellett. To separate the Florian from the lesser Belletts, the more expensive 1600 Super Deluxe was added in March 1968. This model benefitted from plush standard equipment, including air conditioning and leather seats. The list of standard equipment expanded so that the Florian would compete for sales against more popular products from larger Japanese manufacturers, helping to justify the yearly road tax bill for using a large displacement engine, while remaining compliant with Japanese Government dimension regulations. In March 1969 the sportier 1600 TS ("Touring Sports") appeared, fitted with the Bellett GT's twin carb engine, producing 90 PS (66 kW) at 5,400 rpm. Originally fitted with large, single rectangular headlights, the sporting 1600 TS introduced twin round units, a layout which became standard following the Florian's first facelift in October 1970. But already, in September 1969, the overhead cam G161S engine was introduced. Power increased from 84 to 90 PS (62 to 66 kW) for the Super Deluxe and from 90 to 103 PS (66 to 76 kW) for the twin-carb 1600TS. The Deluxe still made do with the earlier OHV engine.

October and November 1970 was also when the bigger 1.8 L (1,817 cc) was introduced, with 100 or 115 PS (74 or 85 kW) in the Super Deluxe and 1800TS models respectively. This facelift brought with it a longer, more prominent nose, which also increased the overall length by 50 mm (2.0 in). The 1600 Deluxe (now with the G161S SOHC engine) received this updated bodywork a little later, in December 1970. The lower powered 1800 engine was also available in the Van version (PA30V).

The Florian was originally available as a four-door sedan and a five-door Van (station wagon). The wagon was sold as a commercial vehicle in Japan, benefiting from various tax breaks. The Van did not last until the end of production. The six-light glasshouse is of an unusual shape, with the rear doors being shared with the double-cab Isuzu Faster (KB) pickup truck. The spacious Florian replaced the Isuzu Bellel and was in turn replaced by the Isuzu Aska (originally marketed as the "Florian Aska") in the Isuzu lineup. Originally available as a six-seater with a column-mounted three-speed shifter (or automatic), a floor-shifted five-seat model called "Owners DeLuxe" was also marketed in the first year. The three-speed manual was replaced with a four-speed manual in April 1968. The dashboard was very distinct, featuring two symmetrical oval, woodgrain-trimmed dashpods for the driver and passenger, with oval gauge pods as well.

November 1973 marked another facelift, including a reworked rear end for the sedans. As the vans only saw limited sales they were only changed at the front. The only 1600-engined sedan still available by this time was a taxi version with an LPG-powered version of the overhead valve G161 engine, with 78 PS (57 kW) SAE and a three-speed column-shifted manual. By the 1976 Tokyo Motor Show the 1600 sedan no longer appeared in pricelists (leaving only the 1800 Super Deluxe, with a newly desmogged engine with 105 PS,) but the van was still only available with the original overhead valve G161 engine with 84 PS [62 kW] at 5200 rpm. By the time of the 1976 Tokyo Show this was switched to the overhead-cam G161Z engine with 94 PS (69 kW).

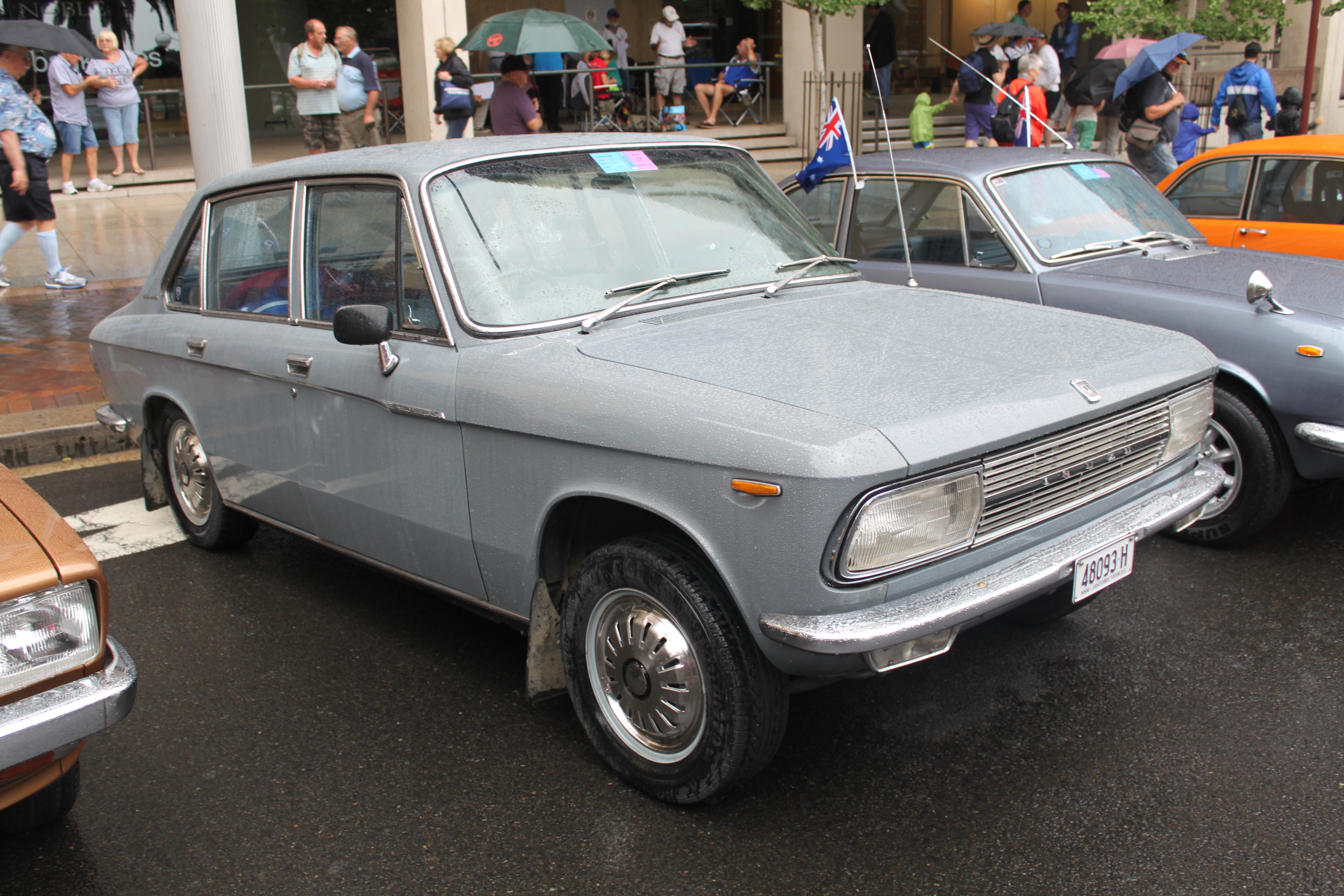
The Florian had rectangular headlights prior to its 1970 facelift

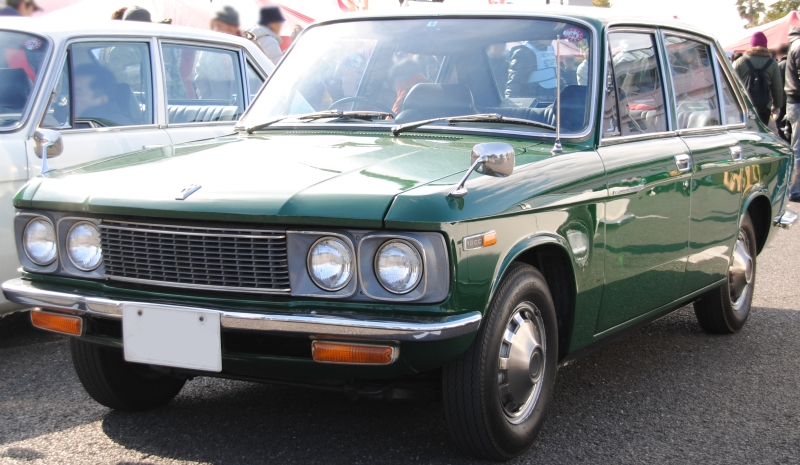
Post facelift Florian 1800 with four round headlights

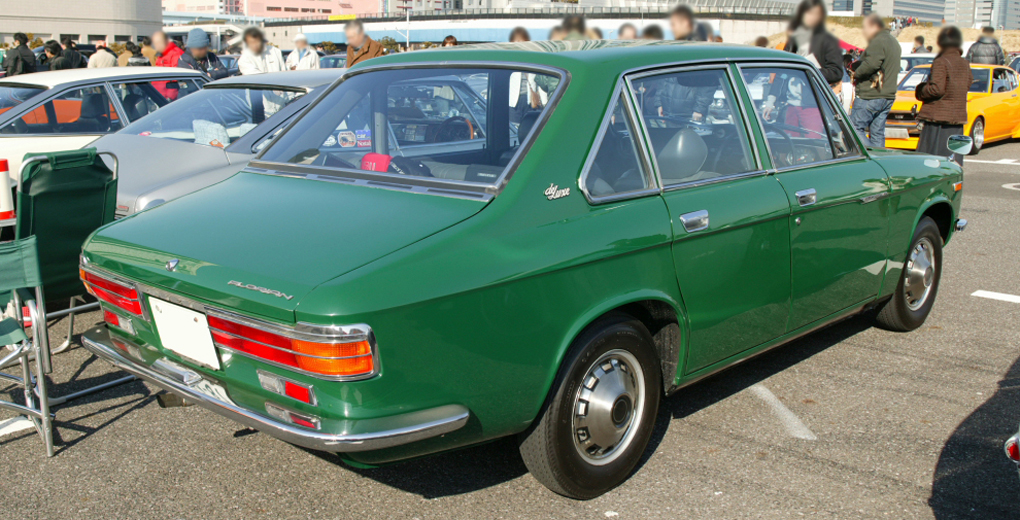
Rear view of Florian 1800 Deluxe (first facelift version)

=== Series II ===
In October 1977, the Florian underwent an extensive facelift. The interior and dash was all new, and at the front were double rectangular headlights. The car was now known as the Florian SII (for "Series II"), but none of this could hide the outdated profile of Isuzu's large sedan. The bumpers were also bigger (and heavier), and there were new, blocky taillights at the rear. The Van also underwent the same facelift, although its delicate, high-mounted taillights still remained unchanged. The facelift also marked the introduction of a diesel-engined model (appearing in November), which provided a useful boost to the Florian's sales. The sales gain was short-lived, however, as diesel-engined versions of Nissan's Laurel, Mazda Luce and Toyota's Mark II rivals arrived during 1978 and 1979. The Florian II also received improved equipment, including a variable-ratio steering gear and heating ducts in the rear seat.

In May 1979, the gasoline engine was updated with the new I·CAS emissions system (a two-way catalytic converter) and exhaust recirculation valve. The modified engine, which meets the 1978 emissions standards for gasoline passenger vehicles, also has five extra horsepower for a total of 110 PS (81 kW). One month later the diesel's Bosch "A" injection system was updated to the newer "VE" system, in order to meet the stricter 1979 emissions standards. In March 1980 the old symmetrical dashboard was retired in favor of the one also used in the 117 Coupé, a version which was not available for left-hand drive. Production ended in October 1982, but stock lasted until April 1983 when the new Florian Aska replaced it.

There were only 145,836 Florian sedans produced during the 15 years of the model's existence, and 42,625 Vans. The Florian was only sold in limited markets across the globe as Isuzu's passenger products were, for the most part, not sold through General Motors' channels. However the pickup derivative, the Isuzu Faster, was widely exported using Isuzu's relationship with General Motors and enjoyed a considerably greater market penetration than the sedan. The pickup was sold in North America as the Chevrolet LUV, in Europe as the Bedford KB and in Australia, through Holden dealerships as both the Holden Rodeo and later as the Chevrolet LUV.

=== Origins of the name ===
The Florian was not named after Saint Florian, but rather after the fictional Lipizzan white horse belonging to the Emperor of Austria, which is the focal character of Felix Salten's (the author of Bambi) 1934 novel, Florian - the Emperor's Stallion. In 1940, a movie based on the book was released, entitled simply Florian. Thus, the later Florian SII features stallion badging.

Sales

Sales (Japanese domestic market)
1967	?	1973	5,055	1979	3,080
1968	?	1974	2,780	1980	?
1969	?	1975	1,442	1981	490
1970	9,486	1976	763	1982	?
1971	6,977	1977	1,571	1983	?
1972	6,931	1978	6,195		
