= 11/7 =

11/7 may refer to:

- November 7 (month-day date notation)
- July 11 (day-month date notation)
  - 2006 Mumbai train bombings also known as 11/7 and 7/11, 11 July 2006 terrorist attacks in Mumbai by the Lashkar-e-Taiba
- 11 shillings and 7 pence in UK predecimal currency

== See also ==
- 117 (disambiguation)
- 7/11 (disambiguation)
