= B17 =

B17, B 17 or B-17 may refer to:

== Aviation ==
- Boeing B-17 Flying Fortress, an American World War II heavy bomber
- Saab B 17, series of Swedish dive bomber/reconnaissance aircraft

== B-17 Flying Fortress related ==
- B-17, Queen of the Skies, a solitaire board war-game
- B-17 Bomber (game), a 1982 Mattel game made for the Intellivision console
- B-17 Flying Fortress (computer game), a flight simulator
- "B-17", a segment from Heavy Metal

== Transportation and vehicles ==
- B17 (New York City bus), a bus line serving the Canarsie, East Flatbush and Crown Heights neighborhoods in the New York City borough of Brooklyn
- LNER Class B17, a British 4-6-0 steam locomotive class
- B17, a bicycle saddle line by Brooks England
- A generation of Nissan Sentra built since 2013

== Other uses ==
- Amygdalin, sometimes incorrectly referred to as vitamin B17
- Boron-17 (B-17 or ^{17}B), an isotope of boron
- HLA-B17, an HLA - B serotype gene
- B17, the Steinitz variation of the Caro–Kann Defence's code from the Encyclopaedia of Chess Openings
- "Please Mr. Please", song about a song in slot B-17 of a jukebox
- Sector B17, a housing scheme project in Islamabad, Pakistan

== See also ==
- B117 (disambiguation)
- 17 (disambiguation)
