= Isuzu Bellel =

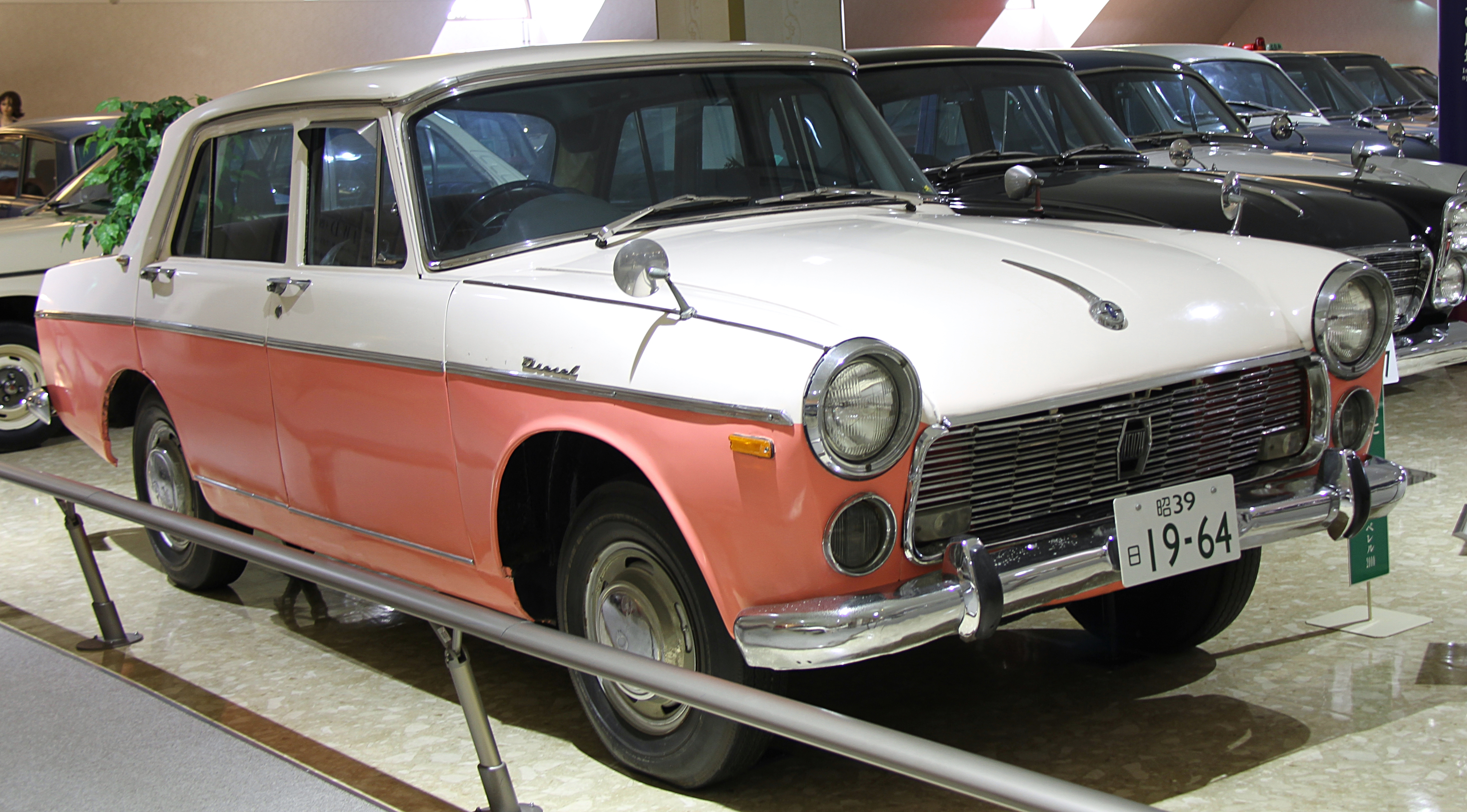
- 1964 Bellel 2000 Deluxe

Overview
- Manufacturer: Isuzu
- Production: 1961–1967
- Assembly: Japan: Fujisawa, Kanagawa (Fujisawa Plant)

Body and chassis
- Class: compact
- Body style: 4-door sedan 5-door station wagon (Express)

Powertrain
- Engine: petrol: 1491 cc GL150 I4 OHV (PA10); 1949 cc G200 I4 OHV (PA10); diesel: 1999 cc DL200 I4 (PAD10); 1991 cc DL201 I4 (PAD10)
- Transmission: 4-speed manual

Dimensions
- Wheelbase: 2,530 mm (99.6 in)
- Length: sedan: 4,470 mm (176.0 in) wagon: 4,485 mm (176.6 in)
- Width: 1,690 mm (66.5 in)
- Height: sedan: 1,515 mm (59.6 in) wagon: 1,500 mm (59.1 in)
- Curb weight: sedan: 1,190 kg (2,624 lb) wagon: 1,295 kg (2,855 lb)

Chronology
- Predecessor: Isuzu Hillman Minx
- Successor: Isuzu Florian

The Isuzu Bellel is a compact car produced by the Japanese automobile manufacturer Isuzu from 1961 to 1967. It was the company's first independent design, and also Japan's first passenger car with a diesel engine. It was available as a four-door sedan and a five-door station wagon, called the Bellel Express. The Bellel Express, introduced in June 1963, was technically speaking a commercial vehicle, as was the custom in Japan at the time. The name "Bellel" resulted from combining the English word "bell" with the Roman numeral "L", equalling 50, and thus the name was supposed to represent "fifty Bells" (Isuzu literally means "fifty bells" in Japanese), and reflects a tradition within Isuzu of naming products that use terms that have special significance in Japan. Production began in time for the 1964 Summer Olympics held in Tokyo in October 1964, with initial release in select Japanese cities starting in April 1962.

== Design ==
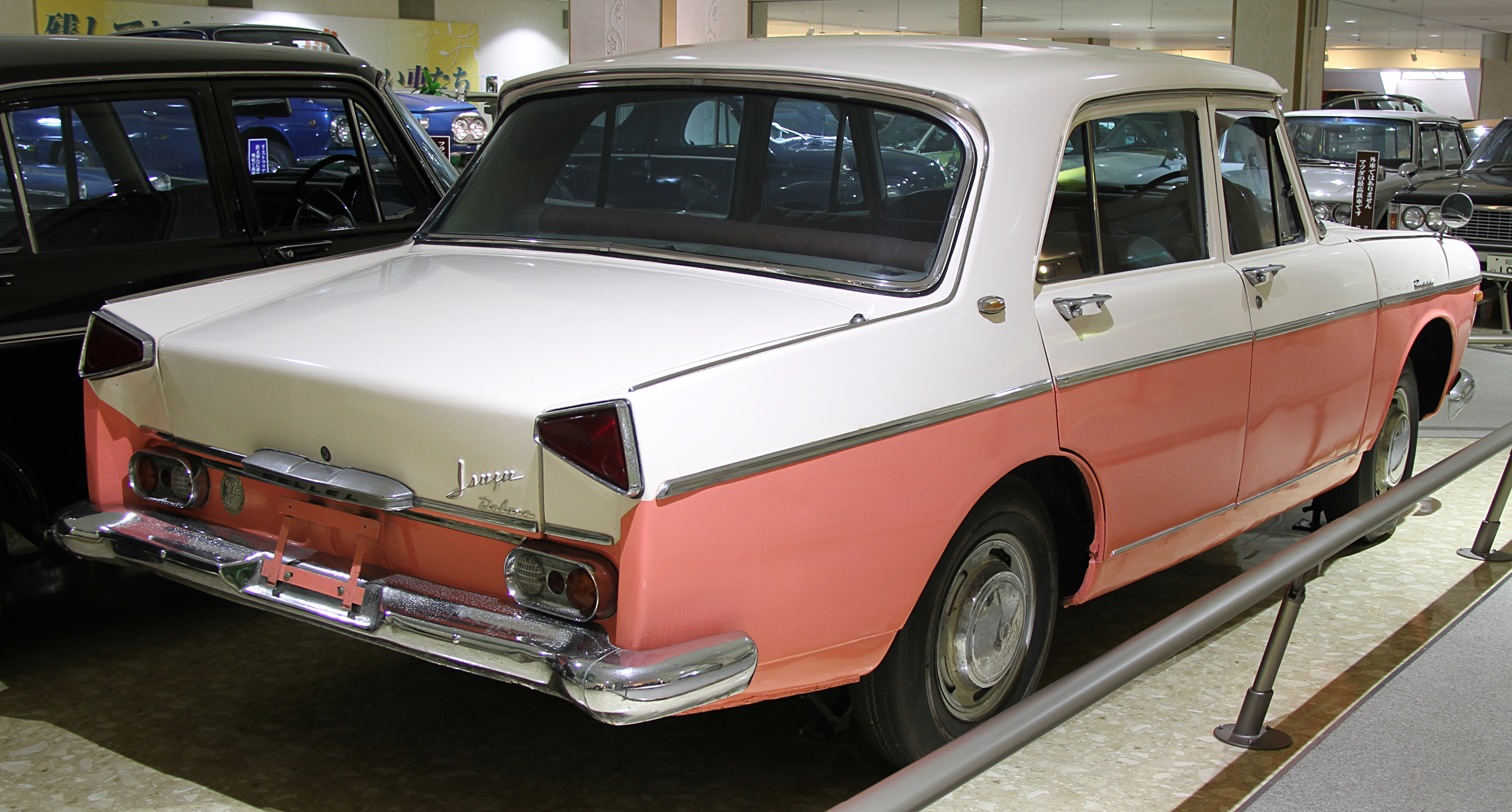
1964 Bellel 2000 Deluxe

The monocoque and suspension setup were modeled after the Hillman Minx. The Minx had been manufactured by Isuzu under a license agreement with the Rootes Group; as production of the Bellel was slow to ramp up and was not popular with private customers, the license-built Minx remained in production alongside the Bellel until 1964.

The Bellel was fitted with 1.5- and 1.9-liter (marketed as a 2.0) gasoline OHV engines with a Bosch licensed fuel injection system, and also the aforementioned 55 PS (40 kW) 2.0 L diesel (DL201) engine. The original diesel engine was called the DL200; it offered 52 PS (38 kW). All engines were mated with a four-speed manual transmission with the shifter mounted on the steering column. Initially, gasoline-powered cars took 80 percent of sales; as more modern competition came on line, diesels took a larger share as sales to private buyers decreased. In 1963, about half Bellels were diesels, and by 1965 four out of five Bellels sold were diesels.

All three engines were offered as Standard models, with a single body colour and sparse equipment. The gasoline 2000 was also available in a better-equipped DeLuxe model, with two-tone paint and additional chrome detailing. To compete for sales against the more popular products from more prolific Japanese manufacturers, Isuzu added the 2000 Special DeLuxe in November 1962. In addition to more ample equipment, this model was also the first Japanese car to be equipped with a twin-carb engine, producing 95 PS (70 kW), which made it one of the most powerful Japanese cars at the time. As the private car ownership market in Japan began to grow, the Bellel was offered as an alternative to the Toyota Crown, Nissan Cedric, and the Prince Gloria.

The Bellel was also briefly offered for sale in the United States, where it was imported by the Trans-Alpac Corporation of Burbank, California. Around 300 units made it to the United States around 1964 and 1965. It was also available in Thailand, where only the diesel engine was offered.

== Facelift ==
The original end treatment was updated in October 1965 in an attempt to afford the Bellel a more formal, upscale and mainstream look. The facelift included changes to the front fascia, where the previous single round headlights paired with smaller turn signals were replaced by quad round headlights arranged vertically. It did not help much; the popularity of LPG-powered taxis removed the Bellel's main market and its share of the large car segment was under two percent in 1965.

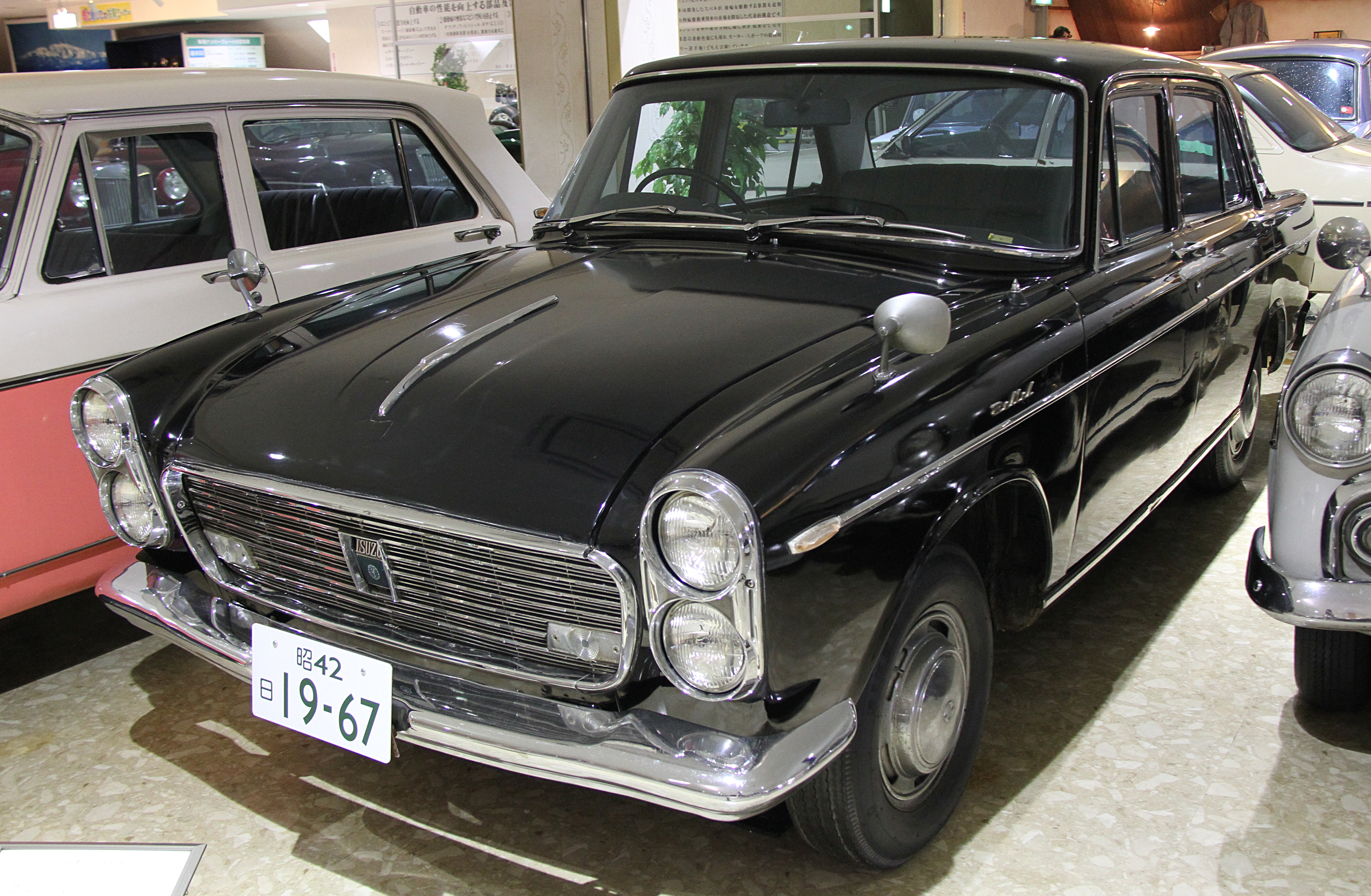
A late (1967) Bellel, after its facelift

The diesel engine - a first for a Japanese passenger car - made the Bellel popular for commercial applications, such as taxicab services. This partially helped to offset the Bellel's relative unpopularity with private customers, which resulted from the harshness of the early diesel engine and peculiar styling. A small number of these cars found their way into other countries, with the Bellel also offered with left-hand drive. 37,206 Bellels were manufactured in total (including the Express wagon/van), with production coming to an end in May 1967. Isuzu had a long history of manufacturing diesel engine products, and noticed that in Europe, Mercedes Benz and Peugeot offered diesel engines on their intermediate class sedans and decided to follow suit.
