= Isuzu 117 Coupé =

Compact Gran Turismo type 2-door fastback coupé

Isuzu 117 Coupé (PA)
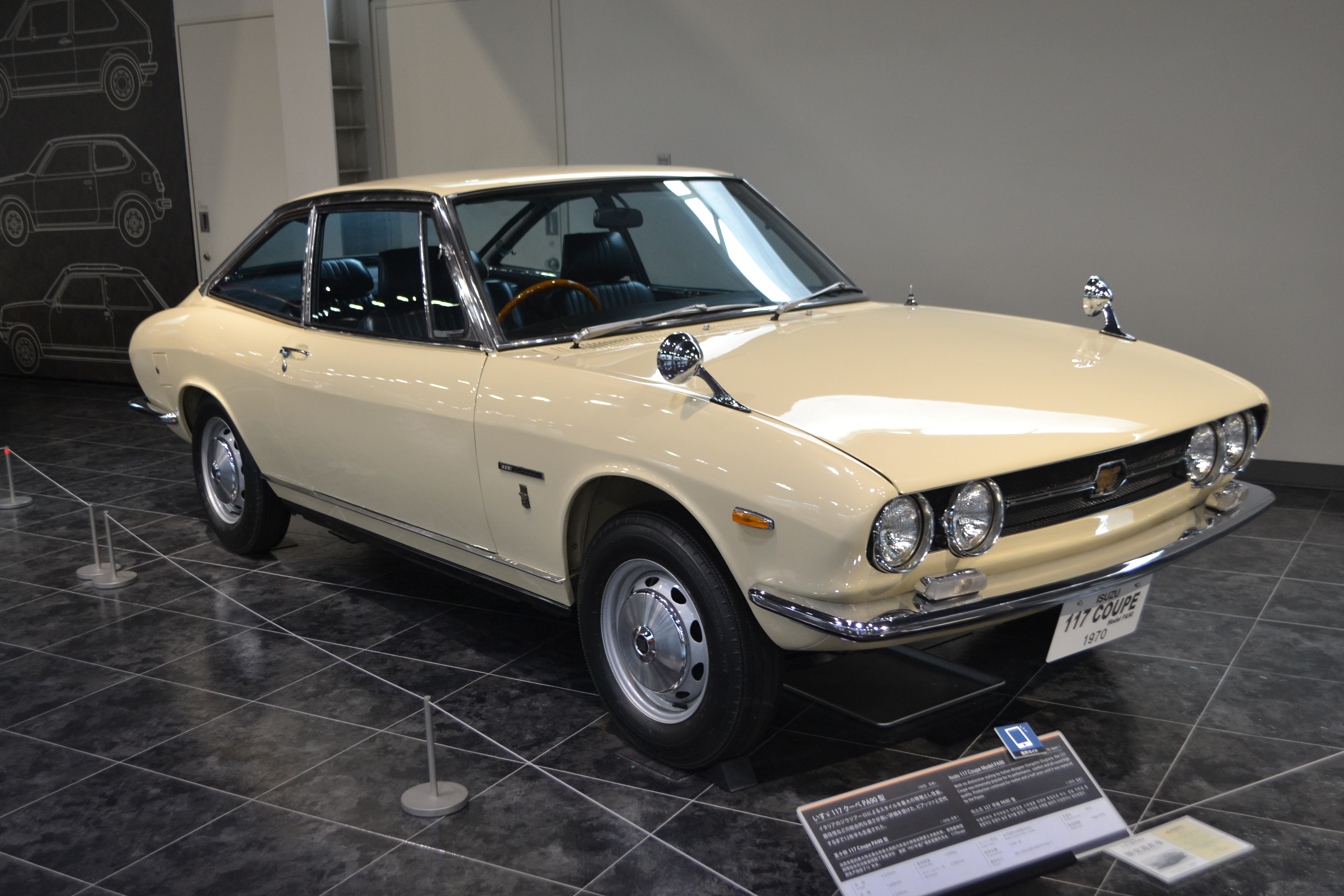
- 1968–1973 Isuzu 117 Coupé

Overview
- Manufacturer: Isuzu
- Production: December 1968 – May 1981
- Assembly: Japan: Kawasaki, Kanagawa (Kawasaki Plant)
- Designer: Giorgetto Giugiaro

Body and chassis
- Class: Sports car
- Body style: 2-door coupé
- Layout: Front-engine, rear-wheel-drive
- Related: Isuzu Florian

Powertrain
- Engine: Petrol: 1584 cc G161W DOHC I4 (1968–1972; PA90); 1817 cc G180N/SS/Z OHC I4 (1970–1981; PA95); 1817 cc G180W DOHC I4 (1973–1978; PA95); 1949 cc G200Z OHC I4 (1978–1981; PA96); 1949 cc G200W DOHC I4 (1978–1981; PA96); Diesel: 2238 cc C223 I4 OHV (1979–1981; PAD96)
- Transmission: 4-speed manual (1968–1981; 1.6/1.8 L); 5-speed manual (1976–1981; 1.9/2.2 L); 3-speed automatic (1975–1981; 1.8/1.9/2.2 L)

Dimensions
- Wheelbase: 2,500 mm (98.4 in)
- Length: 4,280 mm (168.5 in) (1968–1973); 4,310 mm (169.7 in) (1973–1977); 4,320 mm (170.1 in) (1977–1981)
- Width: 1,600 mm (63.0 in)
- Height: 1,310 mm (51.6 in) (1973–1975); 1,320 mm (52.0 in) (1968–1973); 1,325 mm (52.2 in) (1976–1981)
- Curb weight: 1,050–1,090 kg (2,315–2,403 lb) (1.6 L); 1,055–1,145 kg (2,326–2,524 lb) (1.8 L); 1,070–1,150 kg (2,359–2,535 lb) (1.9 L); 1,165–1,190 kg (2,568–2,624 lb) (2.2 L)

Chronology
- Successor: Isuzu Piazza

The Isuzu 117 Coupé is a compact Gran Turismo type 2-door fastback coupé which was produced by the Japanese automobile manufacturer Isuzu between 1968 and 1981. 117 was the codename for a common development program of Isuzu mid-size cars, involving a coupé, sedan, and station wagon. The latter two eventually became the Isuzu Florian, but the coupé kept the original name. The two ranges shared mechanicals, including the complete FR layout chassis with recirculating ball steering.

The 117 Coupé was styled by the Giorgetto Giugiaro, being one of the first Japanese cars designed by an Italian stylist. It was among the first Japanese cars with a DOHC engine, and the first with electronic fuel injection. The 117 can be regarded as the world's first sports car to be available with a diesel engine. It was a rather exclusive vehicle during its lifetime, and is a rare collectible now, but thanks to its unusually long lifecycle, Isuzu manufactured 86,192 units. In 1981, the 117 Coupé was replaced by the Isuzu Piazza in the Isuzu lineup.

== Early years ==
The 117 Coupé debuted as a prototype at the 1966 Geneva Motor Show, and was later shown at the Tokyo Motor Show the same year. In December 1968, Isuzu began preliminary production of 117 Coupés, which were handmade in amounts rarely exceeding 50 a month. It was marketed in a similar manner to the Nissan Silvia, which had been introduced in 1965. As Japanese auto sales increased, Isuzu intended for the 117 to draw customers into showrooms. Driving sales of more affordable models such as the Isuzu Bellett.

The first engine available was a 1.6 L DOHC inline-four. In 1970, an electronic fuel injection unit from Bosch debuted, using the D-Jetronic system. The model fitted with fuel injection was named the EC (for "electronic control"). A twin-carb 1.8-litre SOHC version was added to the range in November 1970.

The 117 included leather seats, dashboard trim made of Taiwanese camphor laurel wood, and headrests as standard. This carried over to the less luxurious 1800N version added in 1971, powered by a single-carb version of the 1.8-litre single-cam engine. In total, 2,458 early 117s were made from December 1968 until late 1972.

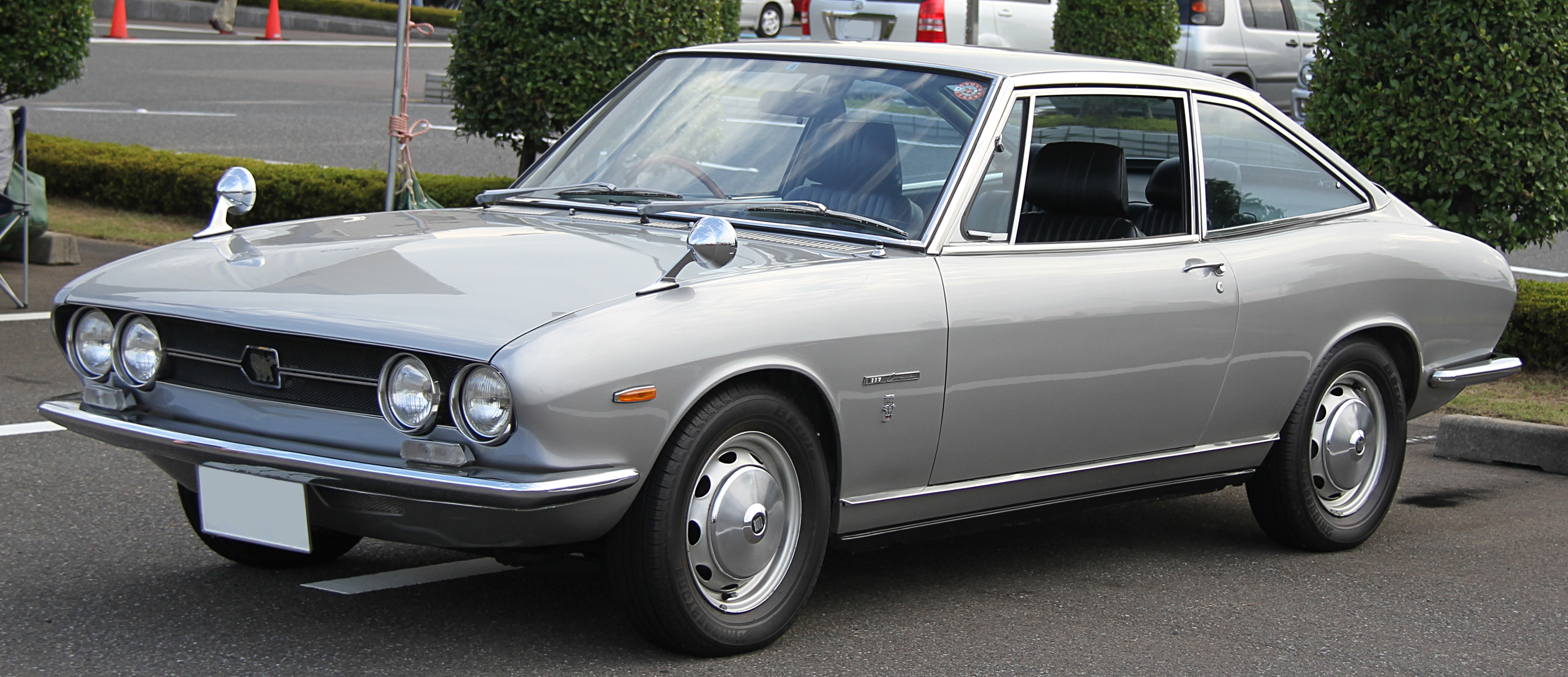
1968–1973 Isuzu 117 Coupé

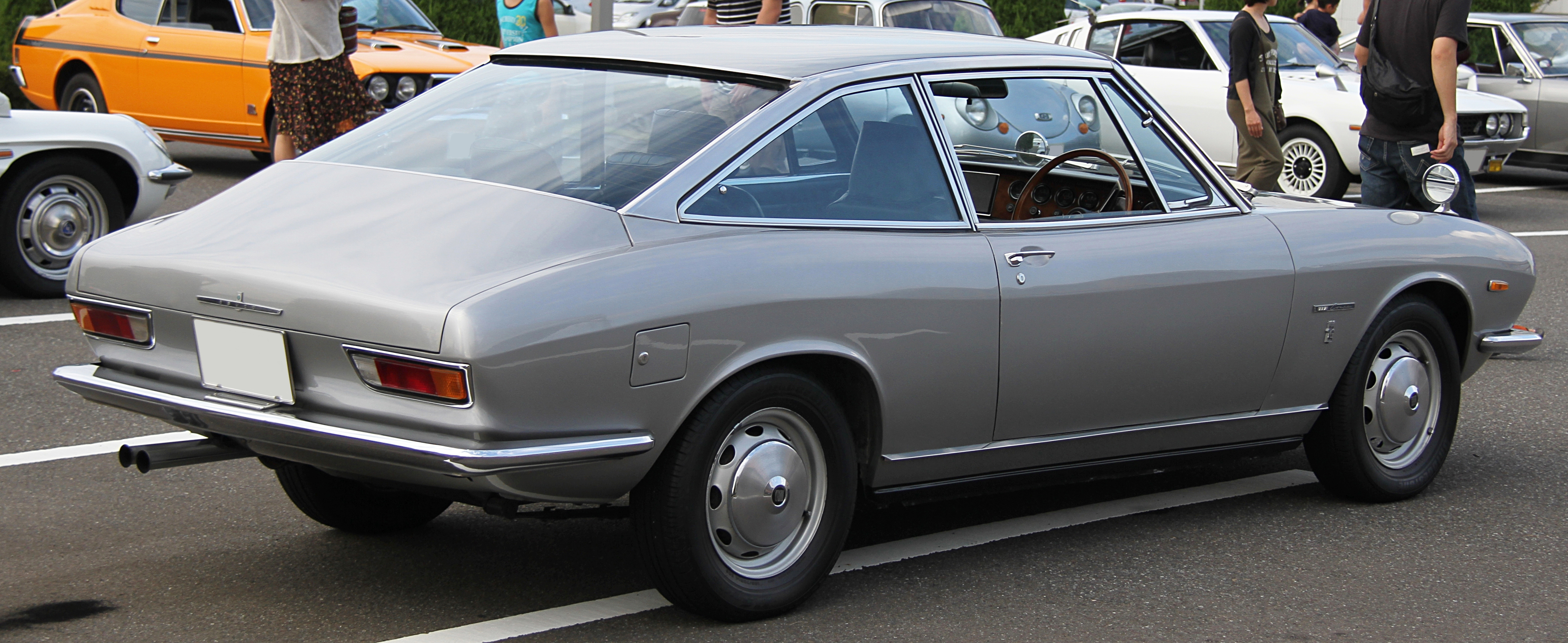
1968–1973 Isuzu 117 Coupé

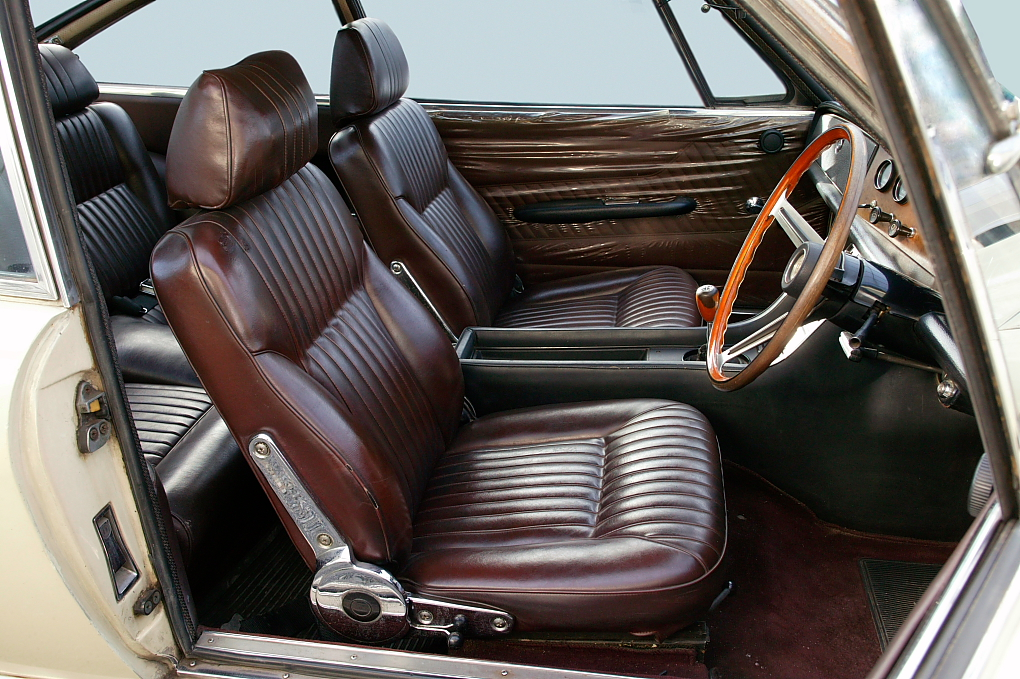
Early interior

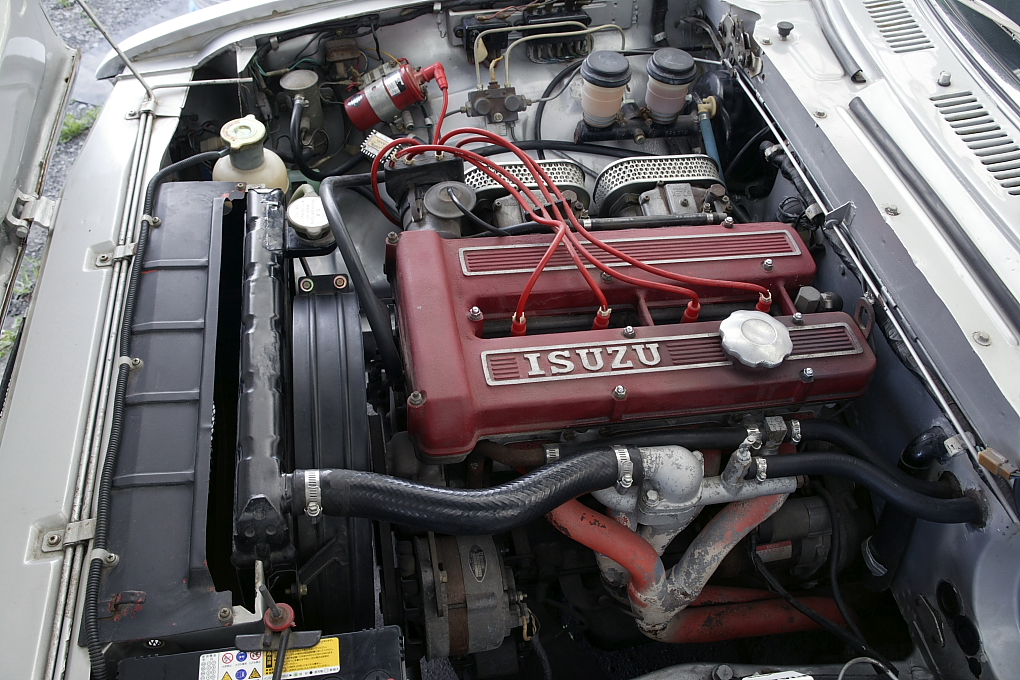
Isuzu G161W 1.6 L engine

=== Isuzu Cruiser ===
At the 1971 Tokyo Motor Show, a shooting brake version of the Isuzu 117 named the 117 Cruiser was showcased. The model did not enter mass production.

== Mass production and first facelift ==
After General Motors acquired a 34% stake in the company in 1972, Isuzu now had the capacity to mass-produce the 117. This change in production took place in March 1973. Sales jumped from 965 units in 1972 to 9506 units in 1974. The 1.8 L engine became standard, with several versions available, with or without fuel injection and with DOHC or SOHC valvetrains. Power outputs dropped somewhat in October 1975 due to new emissions standards. These regulations caused the XG model to be dropped from the lineup.

In May 1976 the manual transmissions were changed to five-speed units.

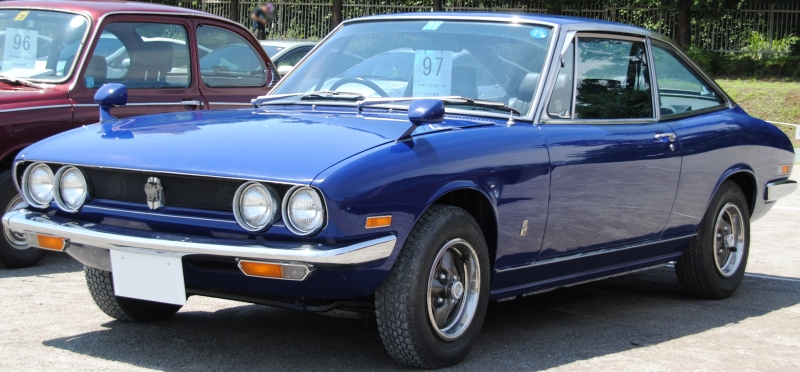
1973–1977 Isuzu 117 Coupé

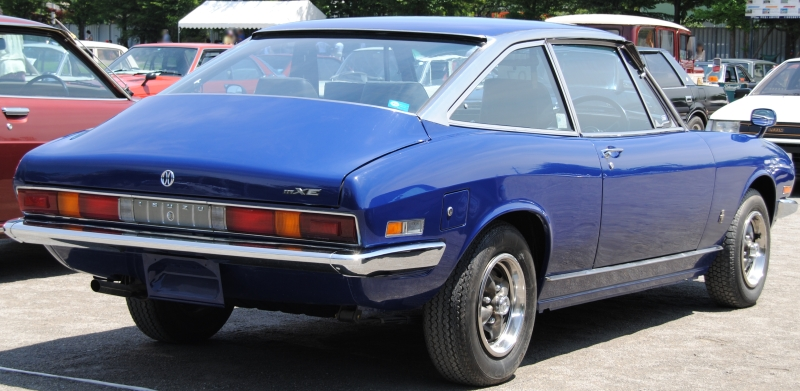
1973–1977 Isuzu 117 Coupé

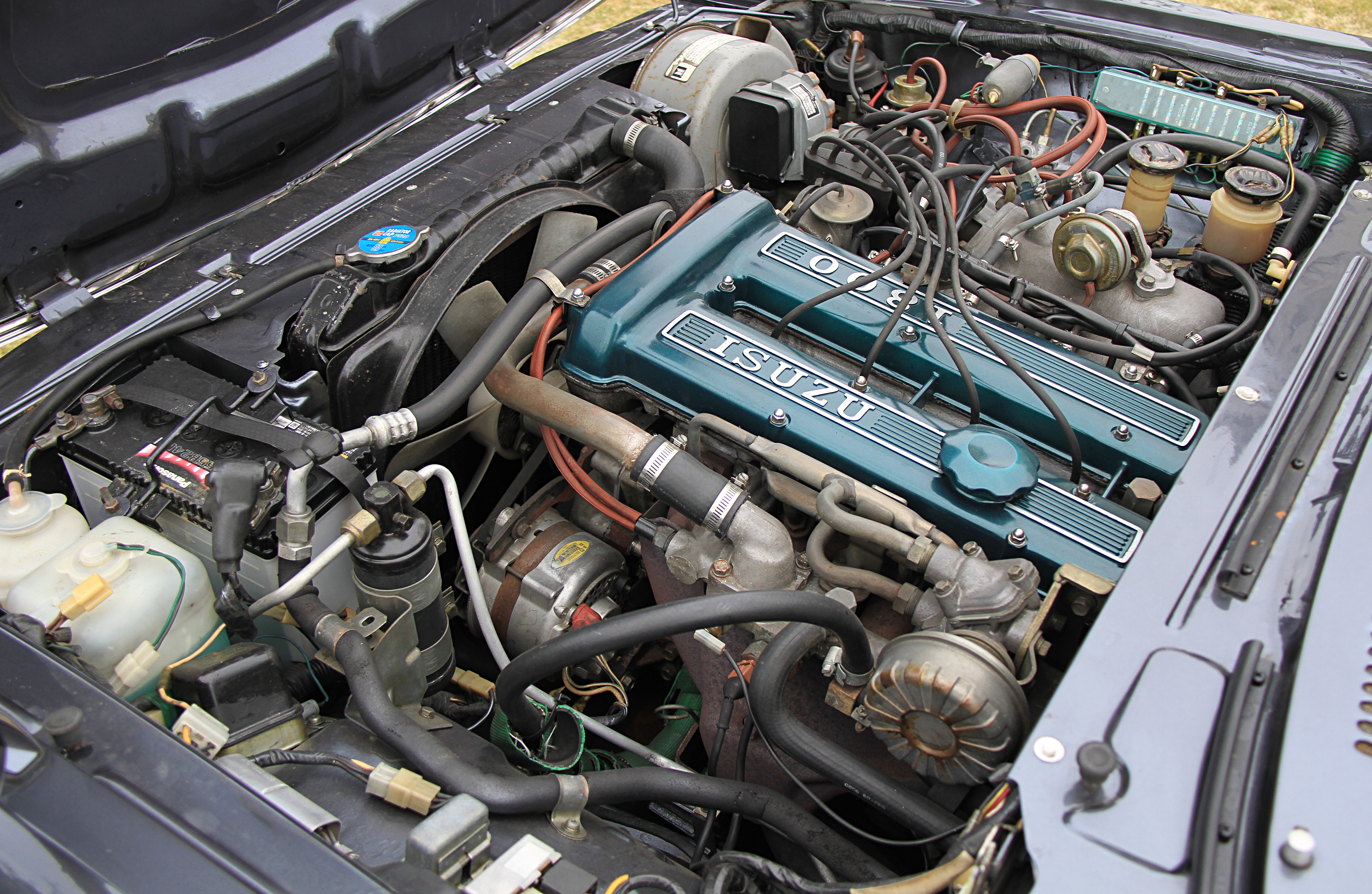
Isuzu G180W 1.8 L engine

== Second facelift ==
In November 1977, Isuzu decided to afford the 117 Coupé a second facelift, which resulted in replacing the previous front fascia with four round headlights with more modern, rectangular lights (keeping their number at four) as well as a front air dam. In an effort to further decrease manufacturing costs, plastic moldings were used in the interior. In 1978, the 1.95-litre engine debuted, and in 1979 the XD diesel-powered version was added.

Starting in 1979, a special version called the Giugiaro Edition was offered. Production of the 117 Coupé lasted until 1981, when it was replaced by the Piazza, also styled by Giugiaro.

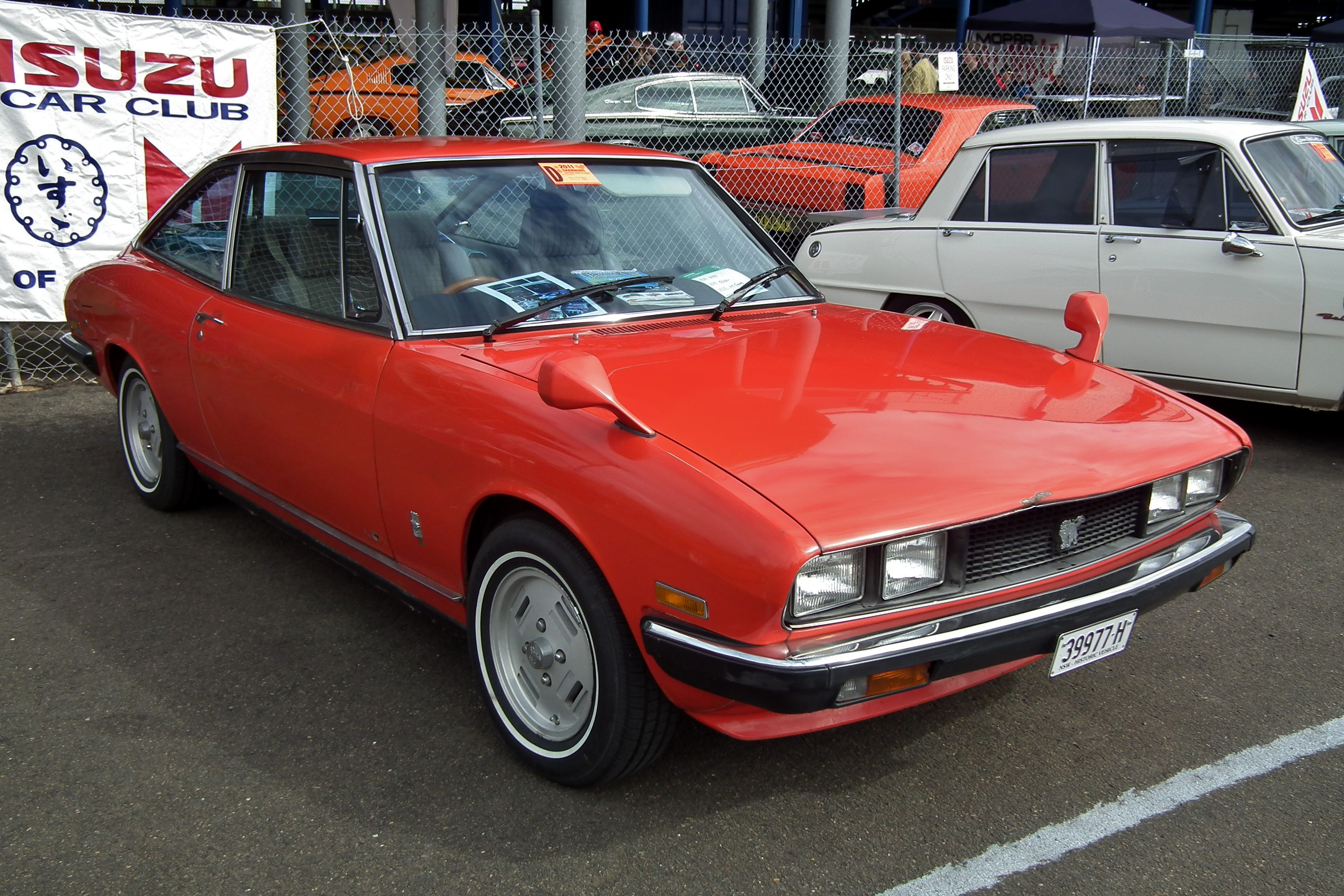
1977–1981 Isuzu 117 Coupé

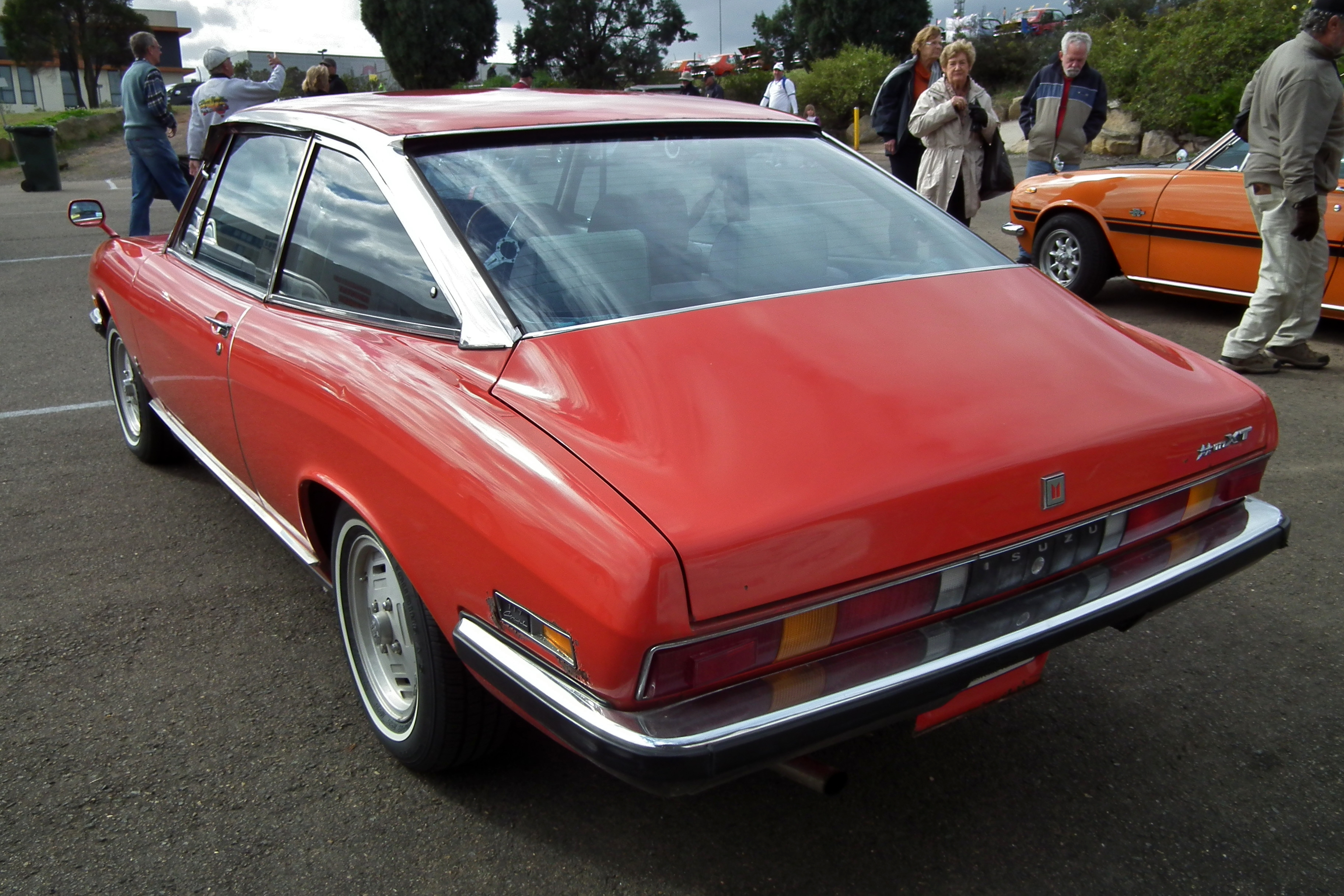
1977–1981 Isuzu 117 Coupé

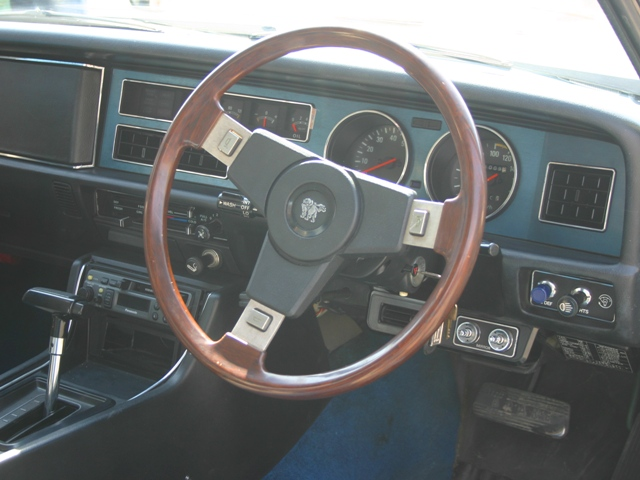
Late interior

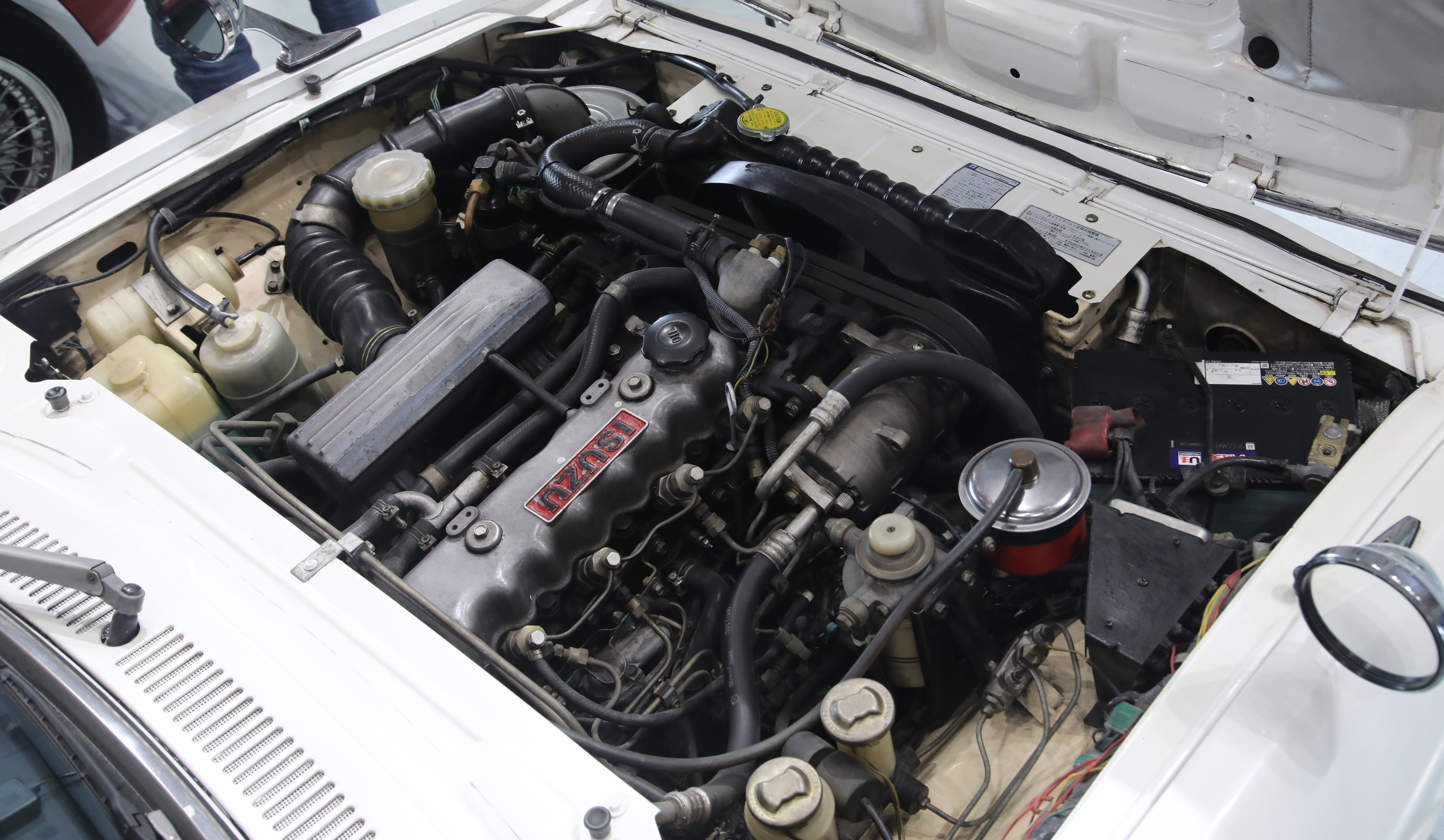
Isuzu C223 2.2 L diesel engine
