= F117 (disambiguation) =

F-117 is the Lockheed F-117 Nighthawk, an American stealth attack aircraft.

F-117 or F117 may also refer to:

- Pratt & Whitney PW2000 (military designation F117), a turbofan jet engine
- HMS Ashanti (F117), a British Royal Navy Tribal-class frigate
- HMS Misoa (F117), a British Royal Navy Maracaibo-class LST Mk.I tank landing ship
- F-117A Nighthawk Stealth Fighter 2.0, a video game for the IBM PC from MicroProse (1991)
- F-117A Stealth Fighter, a video game for the NES from MicroProse (1992)
- F-117 Night Storm, a video game for the Sega Genesis / Mega Drive from Electronic Arts (1993)
