= List of Isuzu vehicles =

This is a list of vehicles sold under the Isuzu brand name.

== Current production vehicles ==
Model	Calendar year introduced	Current model		Vehicle description
Model	Calendar year introduced	Introduction	Update/facelift	Vehicle description
Pickup trucks
D-Max	2002	2019	2023	Mid-size pickup truck. Available in single cab, extended-cab and crew cab body styles.
SUVs
MU-X	2013	2020	2024	Three-row mid-size body-on-frame SUV based on the Isuzu D-Max pickup truck.
Vans
Como	2001	2012	2022	Medium-duty van. Rebadged Nissan Urvan.
Commercial trucks
Elf Mio	2024	2024	–	Light-duty truck.
Elf	1959	2023	–	Medium-duty truck. Also known as the N-Series outside Japan
Forward	1970	2023	–	Medium-duty truck. Also known as the F-Series outside Japan and Giga/Borneo in Indonesia.
Giga	1994	2015	2025	Heavy-duty truck. Also known as the C/E-Series outside Japan. and Tractor based on the UD Quon.
Giga Tractor	1994	2023	–	Heavy-duty truck. Also known as the C/E-Series outside Japan. and Tractor based on the UD Quon.
Traga/Travis	2018	2018	–	Small cab over pickup truck. Also marketed as the Traviz in the Philippines.
Buses
Erga	2000	2015	–	Heavy-duty single decker bus.
Erga Duo	2019	2019	–	Articulated bus.
Erga EV	2024	2024	–	Heavy-duty single decker Electric bus.
Erga FCV	2026	2026	–	Heavy-duty single decker Fuel cell bus.
Erga Mio	1999	1999	–	Medium-duty single decker bus.
Gala	1996	2005	–	Heavy-duty rigid tourist coach.
Gala Mio	1999	2004	–	Midicoach.
Turquoise/Turkuaz	N/A	N/A	N/A	Single decker intercity midibus.

== Former production vehicles ==
- 1961–1967 Isuzu Bellel
- 1962–1980 Isuzu BU
- 1963–1973 Isuzu Bellett
- 1967–1983 Isuzu Florian
- 1968–1981 Isuzu 117 Coupé
- 1970–2021 Isuzu Journey
- 1972–2002 Isuzu Faster
- 1974–2000 Isuzu Gemini
- 1976–2001 Isuzu Journey-Q
- 1980–2001 Isuzu Fargo
- 1980–1984 Isuzu C
- 1981–1993 Isuzu Piazza
- 1981–2002 Isuzu Trooper
- 1983–2002 Isuzu Aska
- 1984–2000 Isuzu Cubic
- 1984–1999 Isuzu Journey-K
- 1986–1988 Isuzu Geminett
- 1986–1996 Isuzu Super Cruiser
- 1988–1993 Isuzu Geminett II
- 1988–2004 Isuzu Rodeo
- 1989–2004 Isuzu Amigo
- 1991–2020 Isuzu Panther
- 1996–2000 Isuzu Hombre
- 1996–2001 Isuzu Vertex
- 1996–1999 Isuzu Oasis
- 1997–2001 Isuzu VehiCROSS
- 1997–1999 Isuzu Fargo Filly
- 1999–2002 Isuzu Filly
- 2001–2004 Isuzu Axiom
- 2002–2008 Isuzu Ascender
- 2003–2009 Isuzu H-Series
- 2003–2011 Isuzu Journey-J
- 2004–2013 Isuzu MU-7
- 2005–2008 Isuzu i-Series
- 2011–2019 Isuzu Reach

== See also ==
- Isuzu
- List of Isuzu engines
