= Erga =

Erga or ERGA may refer to:

- ERGA, Russian manufacturer of magnetic systems
- Erga Edizioni, Italian publisher
- Erga (genus), subfamily Oncomerinae
- Estudantes Revolucionarios Galegos
- European Reference Genome Atlas
- European Regulators Group for Audiovisual Media Regulators
- Isuzu Erga, bus manufactured by Isuzu

== See also ==
- Ergas
