= Ergas =

Ergas is a given name and a surname.

- Ergas Leps (born 1939), Estonian-born Canadian athlete
- Henry Ergas (born 1952), Australian economist and columnist
- Joseph Ergas (1685–1730), Italian rabbi and kabbalist
- Robert Ergas (born 1998), Uruguayan footballer
- Yemima Ergas Vroman (born 1942), Israeli artist

== See also ==
- Erga
