= Isuzu C =

Integral heavy-duty bus

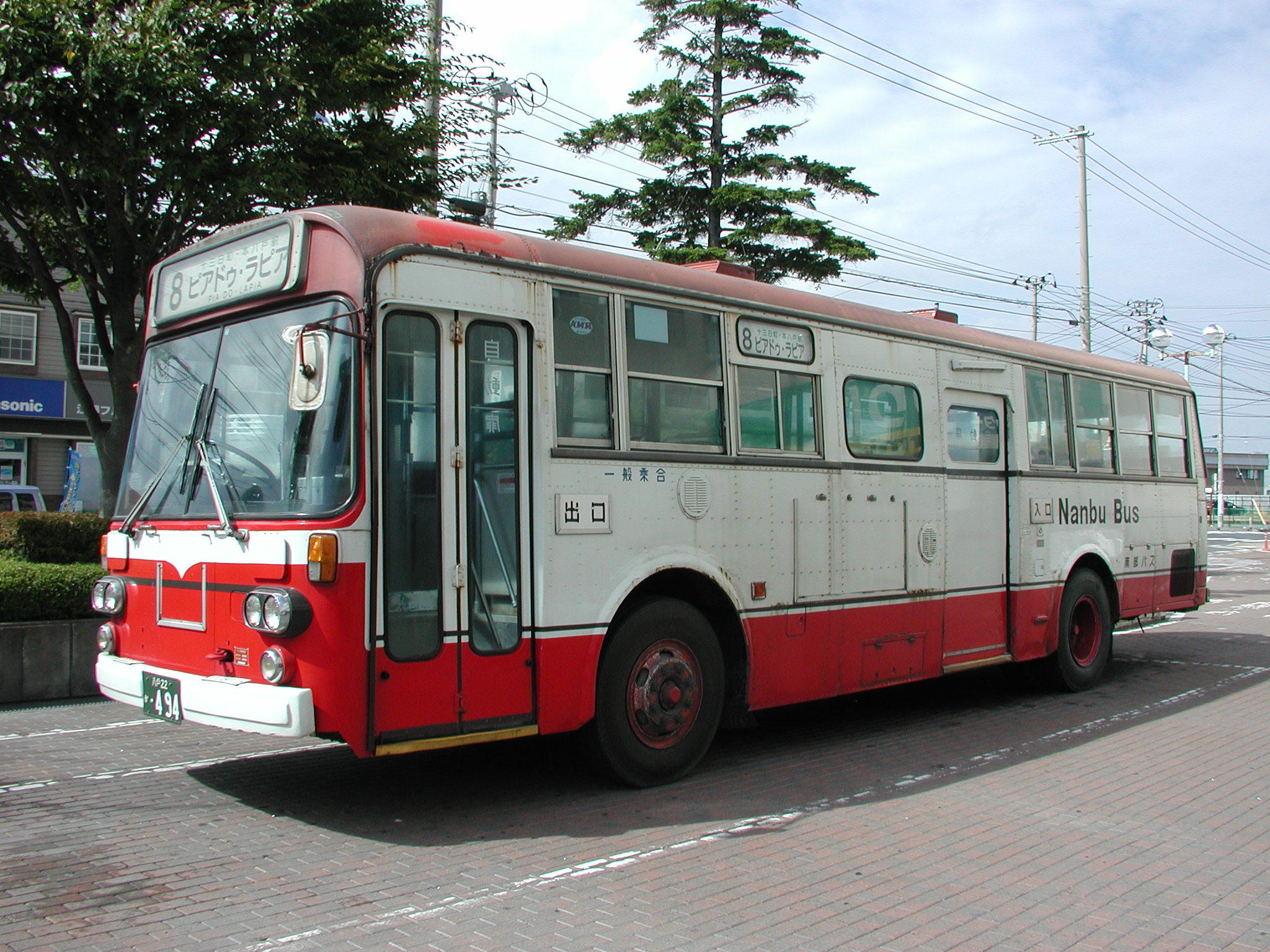
- Isuzu K-CJM500

Overview
- Manufacturer: Isuzu
- Production: 1980-1984

Body and chassis
- Class: Buses
- Body style: Bus

Powertrain
- Transmission: 5-speed manual

Chronology
- Predecessor: Isuzu BU
- Successor: Isuzu Cubic

The Isuzu C (Japanese: いすゞ・C系) was an integral heavy-duty bus that was produced by Isuzu from 1980 to 1984, replacing the earlier BU-series. The differences between the two series were mainly related to making the bus pass the stricter Japanese emission standards introduced in 1979. The range was primarily available as city bus. Its successor was the Isuzu Cubic.

== Design ==
The bodies were made by others manufacturers, including Kawasaki, Fuji, Nishiko, Kitamura, and even Isuzu's competitor Hino, until 1983, due to certain requirements of the Japanese National Railways (JNR), who were the only customer for this type.

== Models ==
M = Leaf suspension, A = Air suspension.

- K-CLM/CLA (1980) - DH100H engine
- K-CJM/CJA (1980) - 6QA2 engine
- K-CPM/CPA (1980) - E120H engine
- K-CQM/CQA (1982) - 6RB2 engine

Wheelbase

- 470: 4.7m
- 500: 5.0m
- 520: 5.2m
- 550: 5.5m
- 600: 6.0m
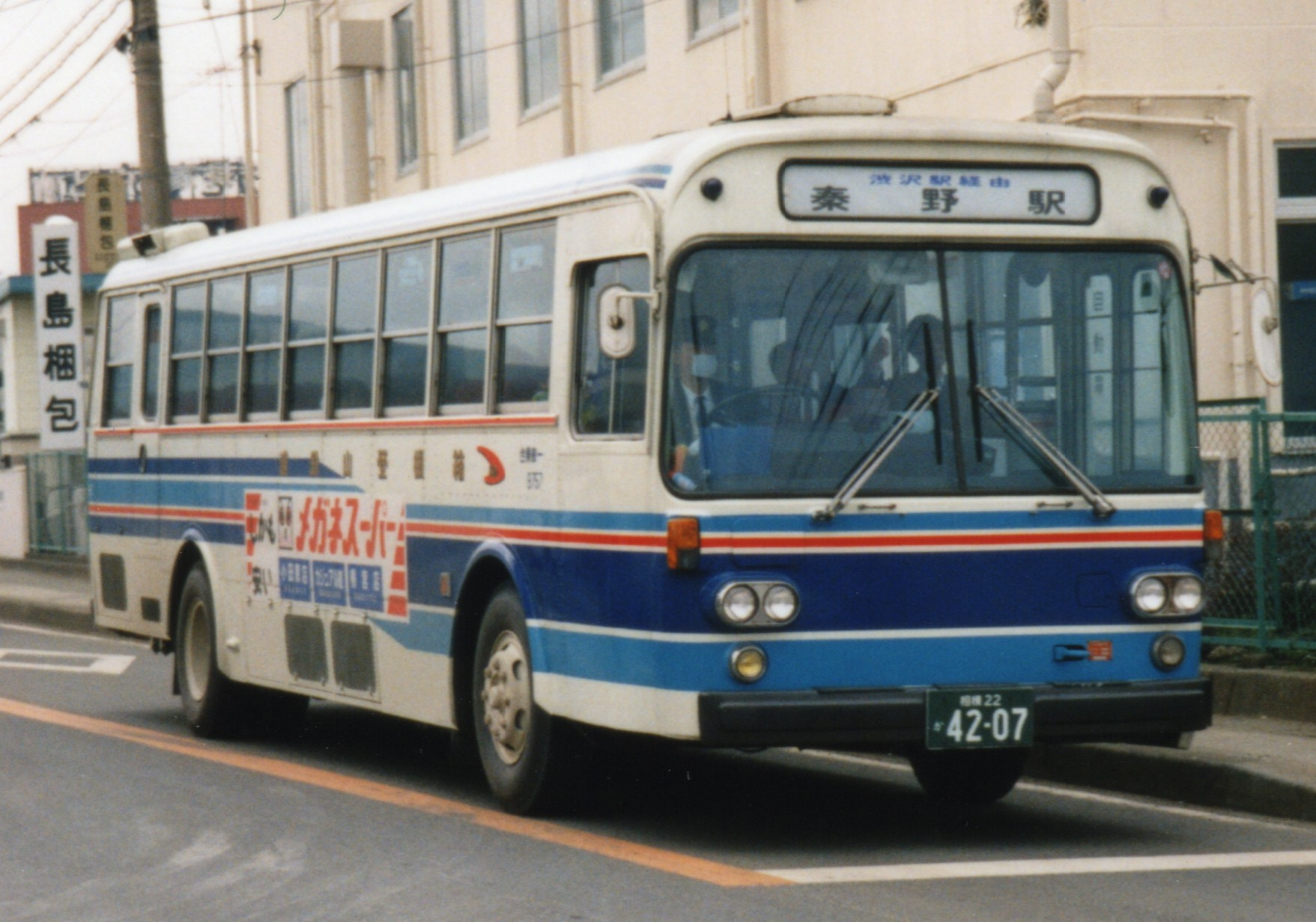
K-CJM550

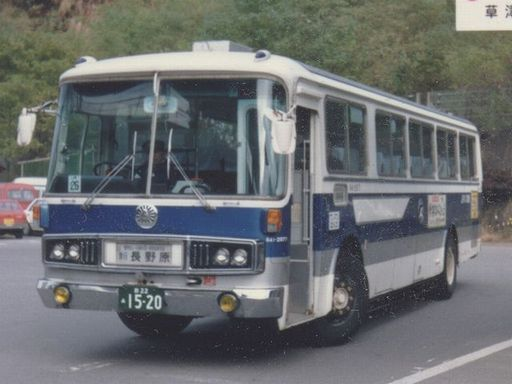
K-CQA550

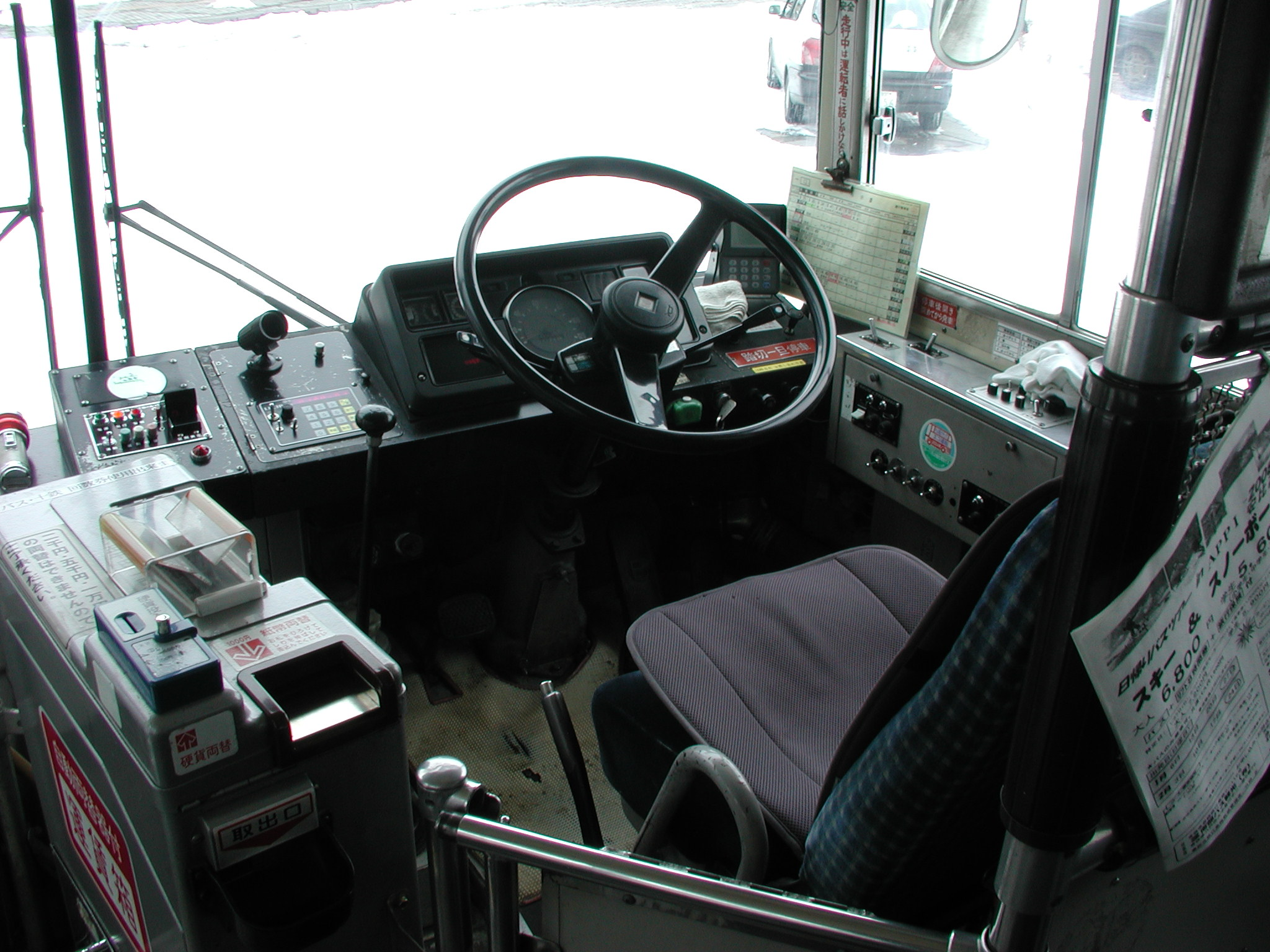
K-CJM500 cockpit

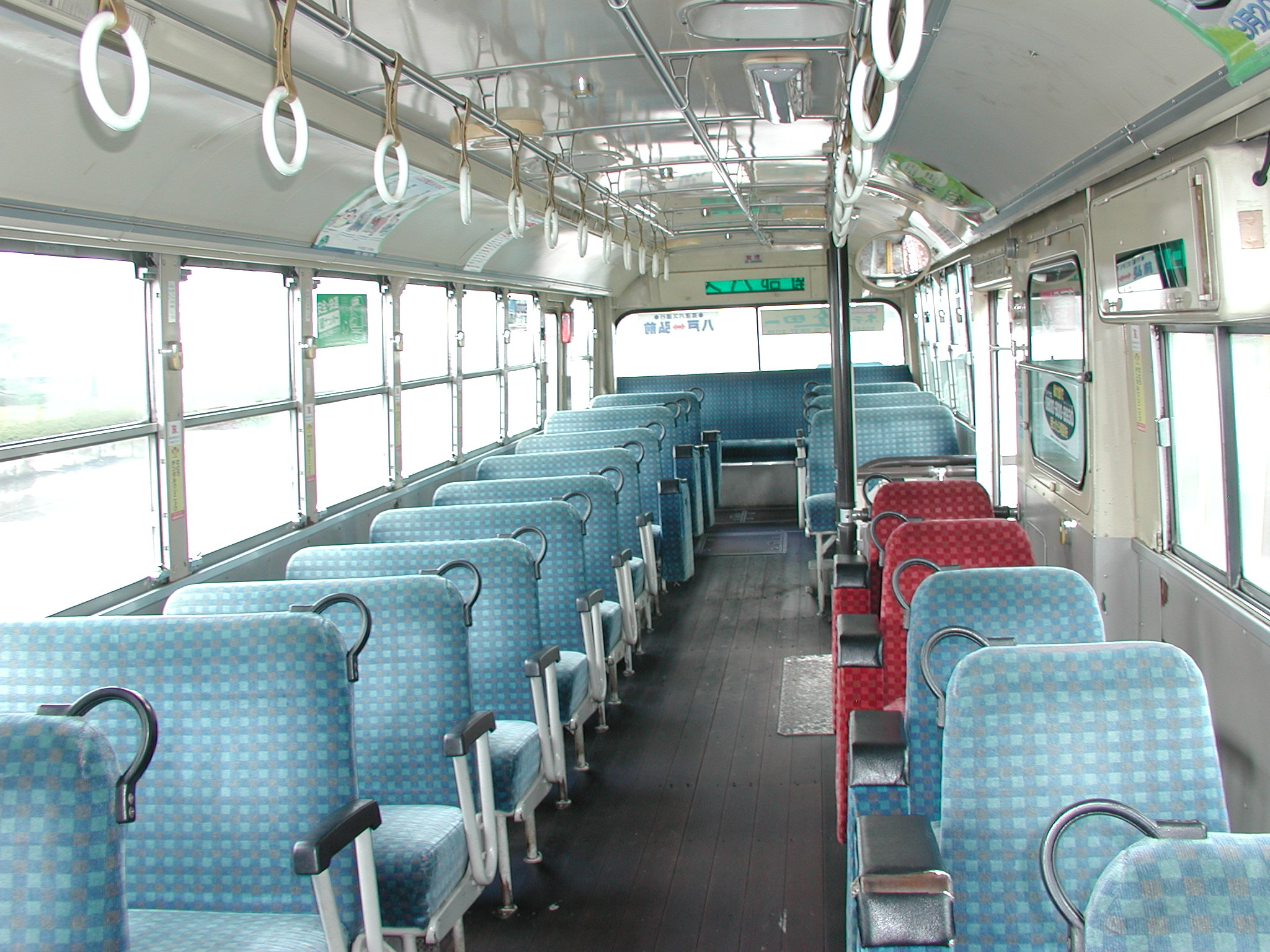
K-CJM500 interior

== See also ==
- List of buses
