= Yemima Ergas Vroman =

Israeli artist, born 1942

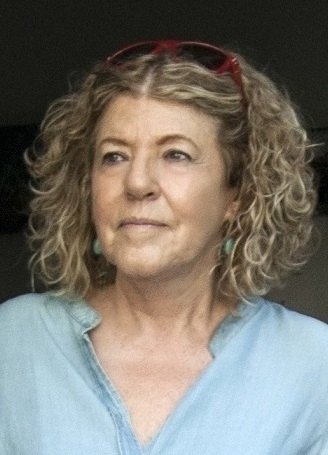
Yemima Ergas Vroman

Yemima Ergas Vroman (Hebrew: ימימה ארגס ורומן; born April 3, 1942) is an Israeli painter who engages in drawing, sculpting, installation and three-dimensional objects in various media. The main theme that distinguishes her works is the "old" versus the "new" in the urban space.

== Biography ==
Yemima Ergas was born in Jerusalem to Dutch-born parents. Her father, Akiva Jaap Vroman, was a professor of geology – one of the pioneers of geological research in Israel and Israel Prize laureate. Her mother, Gonny Vroman, was a pianist and a piano teacher. In 1950, she moved to Haifa, where she was educated until 1960, then enlisted in the IDF and served in the Nahal Brigade. In 1964, after her release from the military service and a two-year stay at Kibbutz Netiv HaLamed-Heh, she moved to live with her family in Jerusalem.

Concurrently with her high school studies, she started her painting studies with painter Sima Slonim and later with painter Rafael Mohar. From 1965 to 1968, she studied at the Bezalel Academy of Art and Design in the Department of Ceramic Design, and until 1977 she engaged in ceramics and sculpture in the private studio she established. Her works have been exhibited in galleries in Israel, Europe and Canada.

Between the years 1977 and 1979, during her family's stay in New York, she was admitted into a continuing program at the Pratt Institute, where she studied three-dimensional design under the tuition of American designer Rowena Reed Kostellow, and color theory in painter Joseph Phillips' class. Upon her return to Israel in 1979, Yemima Ergas resumed painting which became her main occupation.

From 1999 to 2009, she served as a board member of the Jerusalem Artists Association and chaired the Artists' House Exhibition Committee; she also participated in judging committees within various frameworks.

From 2010 to 2015, she was appointed as a member of the Culture and Sports Ministerial Trustees Committee of Visual Arts. Ergas is one of the founding members of the Agripas 12 Cooperative Gallery, founded in 2004 by a group of 15 artists in the city center of Jerusalem. She was active in the gallery until 2012.

She has been teaching painting since the 1980s, and from the 1990s she curated about 20 exhibitions. Her own works have been published in a selection of books and on book covers.

== Works ==
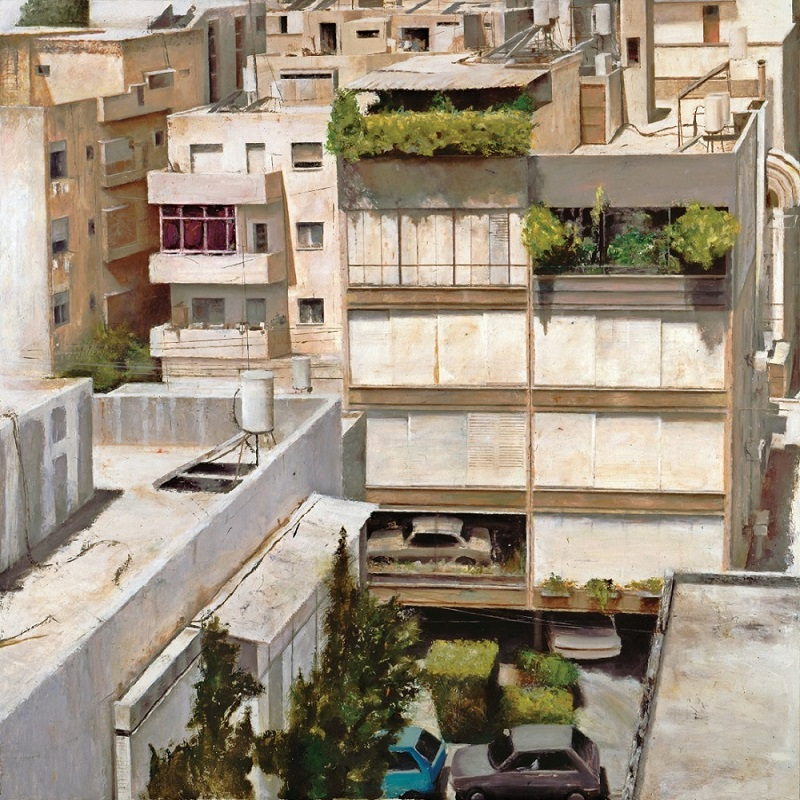
תל אביב 2, 1999 שמן על בד, גובה 140סמ' מוזיאון תל אביב, אוסף משרד החוץ English:Tel Aviv II, 1999, oil on canvas, 56x56", Tel Aviv Museum of Art, collection: Ministry of foreign Affairs

In many of her works, Ergas expresses the processes of degradation and construction, the transformations taking place in the urban, industrial and technological landscape, and the juxtaposition between old and new in material culture. From 1984 to 1987, she focused on paraphrasing the natural local landscape on paper, in her studio, in a free, semi-abstract and abstract language, using various mediums; among others in the series "Man and Place", "Hard Places" and "Uncharted Land". In 1988, after returning from a visit to China, Ergas created a series of paintings of the Forbidden City in Beijing [oil on paper] and has since turned her eyes to the Israeli-built landscape, which yielded various series of works, using a variety of techniques. In 1989, she created a series of charcoal drawings on paper of the old deserted Reading power station in Tel Aviv. From 1995 to 1996, Ergas devoted her entire time to creating the triptych " View of Jerusalem from the Supreme Court" - a cityscape in oil on canvas, measuring 405 X 96 cm. Her work was based on observing the view from the large entrance hall window of the Supreme Court building. The triptych was exhibited in the Israel Museum in 1996, and has since been exhibited in galleries and museums in Israel, the United States, Denmark, Norway, France and the Knesset (Israeli Parliament house) in Jerusalem.

Between the years 1997–2005, Ergas made the large panoramic painting "Altneuland" (a view of Tel Aviv); the "Concrete Land” series, which focused on construction sites and the "Nesher" cement plant; as well as a variety of paintings of Tel Aviv, most of them from a birdlike view. From 2004-2005, she created a group of works of the old city center of western Jerusalem. In 2005–2006, she drew the series of charcoal drawings "Hidden Cities", depicting computer motherboards. In 2007 she produced a series of motherboard sand-castings, entitled "Cities and Memory". From 2009 to 2013 she created a wall installation of a large group of small objects portraying drilling rigs at sea, called "New Territories". Another element that stands out in the works of Yemima Ergas is the "Ars Poetica" characteristic - the constant depiction of her working tools, paintings of the studio's interior and the subject of "color" itself, as themes for paintings and installations. From 2012, Ergas has been engaged in making single-copy artist-books, in various forms of recycling - from paper recycling to producing new handmade paper (for book creation and binding), and to creating her own contents in books that were intended for shredding.

Ergas's works are found in various collections, among others in collections of the Israel Museum, the Ministry of Foreign Affairs (Israeli Embassy in Paris), the Knesset, The Jerusalem Print Workshop, the Nesher cement plant in Ramla, as well as numerous private collections in Israel and around the world. Some of her works present ecological aspects, sometimes suggesting social criticism.

== Special projects ==
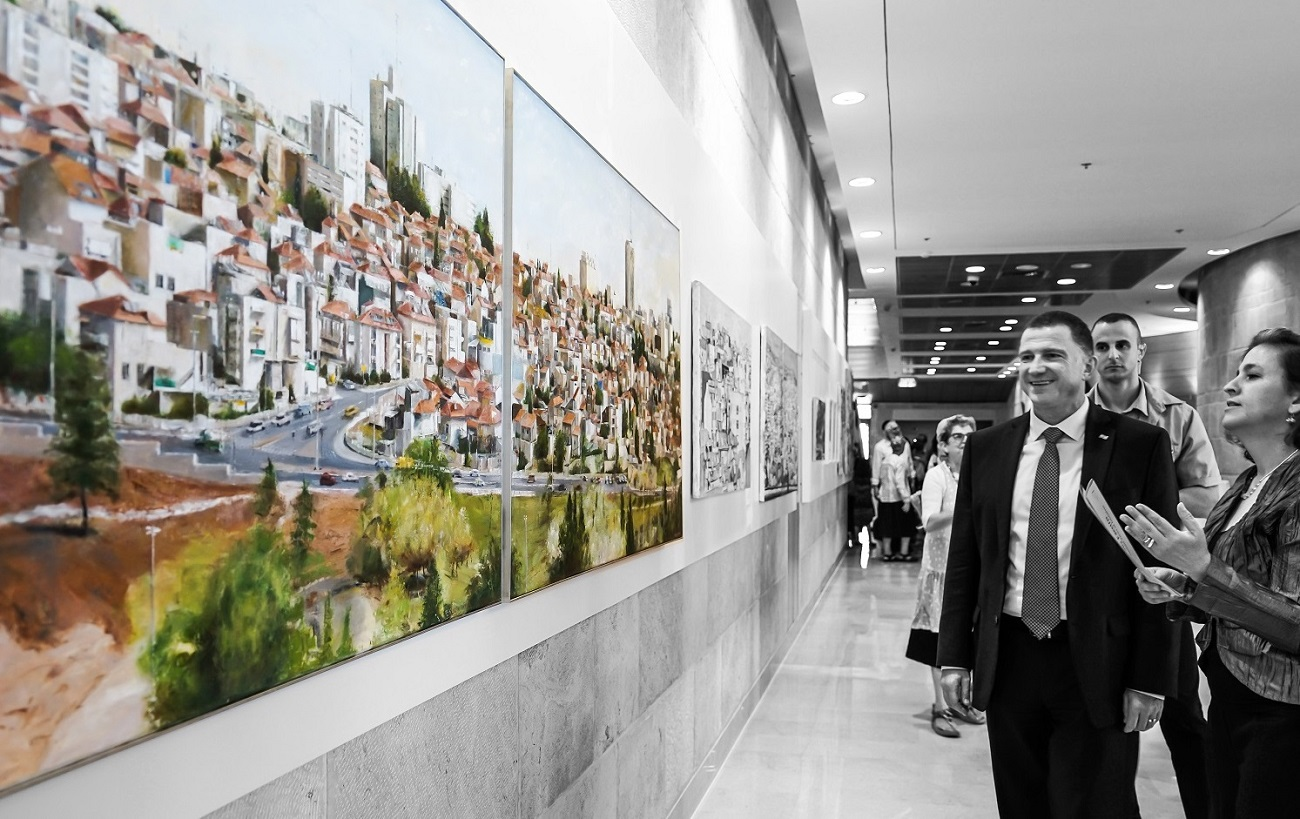
טריפטיכון - מראה מבית המשפט העליון, 1996 שמן על בד, רוחב 405 סמ'- בתערוכה בכנסת, מוזיאון ישראל - English:View of Jerusalem from the Supreme Court, triptych, 1995-96, oil on canvas, 37x162", The Israel Museum, Exhibition at the Knesset Building

- 1975 – Ergas created a ceramic mural, in the Cultural Center of Aminadav cooperative community, commissioned by the Rural Planning Directorate of the Ministry of Construction and Housing.
- 1989 – Ergas designed a memorial hall where she painted a mural for the Nahal paratroopers killed in action, at the military base in Beit Sahur, sponsored by a bereaved parents association, in collaboration with the IDF's Department of Education & History. (The unit has since been moved to another base, and the memorial wall has been transferred elsewhere).
- 1999 - Ergas produced, together with animation artist Alon Ben Ari, an animated video "Earthly Jerusalem 2K" - symbolically expressing the endless conflict over control of Jerusalem through the ages (the video was produced based on a painting she created in 1993).

== Awards, grants and scholarships ==
- 1976 – Award for Designing models for the Ceramic Industry / Ministry of Commerce and Industry
- 1990 – Grant for production of catalog for exhibition of drawings / Israel Electric Corporation
- 1990–1991 – Artist-in-residence scholarship at the La Cité Internationale Des Arts, Paris / Israel Council for Culture and Art
- 1992–1996 – Grant for production and mobility of exhibition in galleries and art venues around the country / Israel Electric Corporation
- 2008 – Guest Artist-in-residence in Reykjavík at the invitation of SIM the Association of Icelandic Visual Artists
- 2015 – Grant for the publication of a comprehensive art book: "Day by day" / National Lottery Council for the Arts.
- 2017 – Award for Life Achievement in Art / Mordechai Ish-Shalom Foundation.

== Her works ==
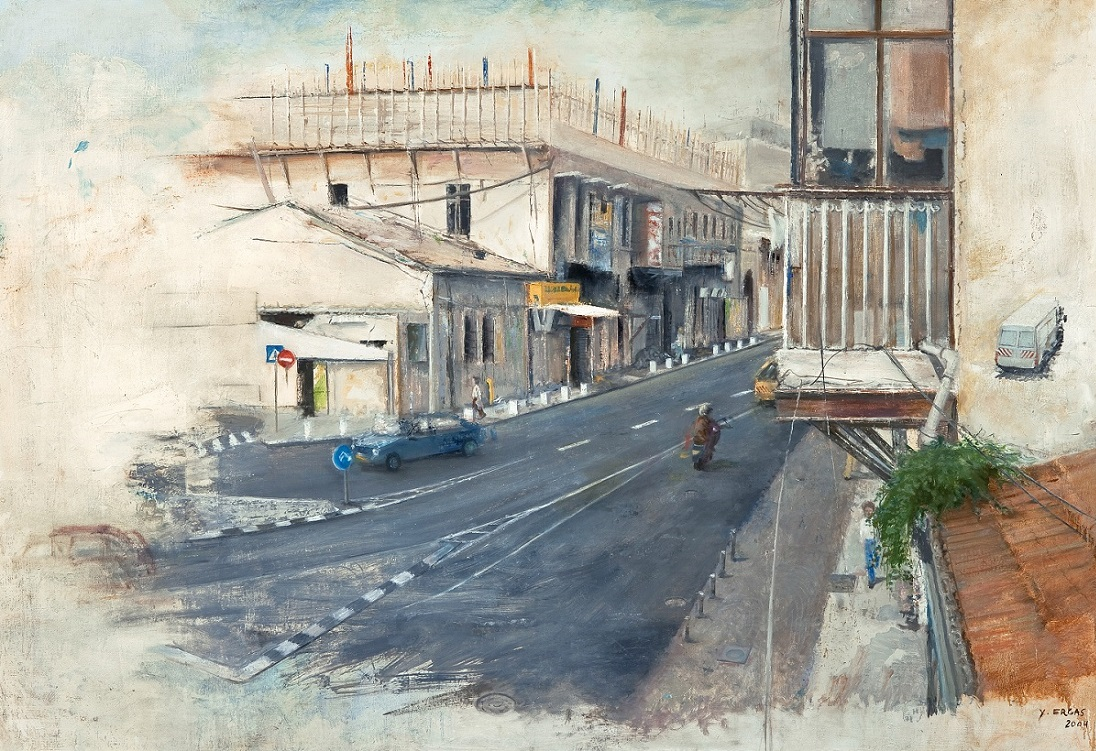
מעלה הרחוב, 2005 שמן על בד, רוחב 130סמ' גלריה אגריפס 12 - English: Up the Street, 2005, oil on canvas, 42x52", Agripas 12 Gallery

Name	Info
Triptych View of Jerusalem from the Supreme Court	1996, an exhibition in the Knesset, The Israel Museum, Jerusalem
Tel Aviv 2	1999, Tel Aviv Museum of Art, Ministry of Foreign Affairs's collection
Plane View	2000, The Artists' Residence, Herzliya
"Concrete Land - Cathedrals and Organs”	2001, private collection
Up the street	2005 Agripas 12 Cooperative Gallery, Jerusalem
Agripas 12	2005, private collection
Objects 26-27	2010, the Jerusalem Artists' House
Artist Book	2013, Memories of South India

=== Solo exhibitions ===
Year	exhibition
1985	"Man and Place", Alon Gallery, Jerusalem; Lohamei Hageta’ot Art Gallery
1988	"China Is Near", Artists' House, Jerusalem
1991	“The Power Station - Charcoal Drawings", The Israel Museum, Jerusalem; Be'er-Sheba Museum
1996	"Hard Places", The Knesset (Israeli Parliament house), Jerusalem
1997-1996	"View of Jerusalem from the Supreme Court”- Triptych, special exhibit, The Israel Museum, Jerusalem
2003	"Concrete Land”, Jerusalem Artists' House; The Artists’ Residence Gallery, Herzliya
2005	"This is what I have in front of my eyes", Agripas 12 Cooperative Gallery, Jerusalem
2007	"Hidden Cities", Ticho House, the Israel Museum, Jerusalem
2010	"Under Observation" - portraits of artists peers, Agripas 12 Cooperative Gallery, Jerusalem
2013	"The Back Yard”, Merhav Leomanut - Art Space Gallery, Old Jaffa, Tel Aviv-Jaffa
2013	"Altneuland", Shay Danon Gallery, Zaritsky Artists' House, Tel Aviv
2015	"Rigs & Table Games", Artists' House, Jerusalem
2017	Exhibition for the launch of the book "Day by day", Bauhaus Center Gallery, Tel Aviv.

=== Selected group exhibitions ===
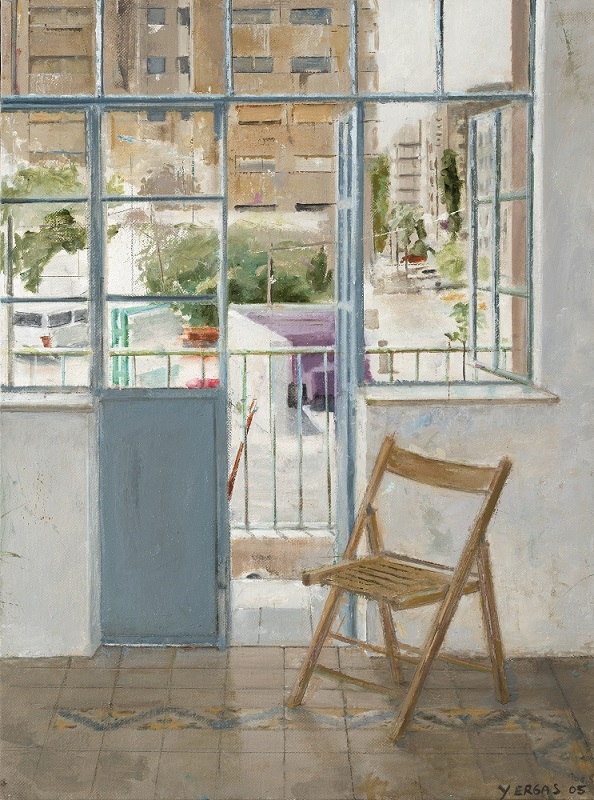
אגריפס 12, 2005 שמן על בד, גובה 54סמ', אוסף פרטי - English:Agripas 12, 2005, oil on canvas, 21.6x15.8", private collection

Year	Exhibition
1990	"The Fall Salon", Grand Palais, Paris
1994	"The Pleasure of Deception", "Noga" Gallery of Contemporary Art, Tel Aviv
1994	"Uniqueness", Pavilion of the Zaritsky Painters and Sculptors Association, Tel Aviv
1994	"Out of Observation" - Art Focus, Fisher Hall, Mishkenot Sha'ananim, Jerusalem
1997	"At Eye Level" - Portrait in Israeli Art, Artists' House, Jerusalem
1997-1999	" Miniartura" - Israeli Art in small format, Palazzo Ducale Museum, Gubbio; Gallery of Modern Art, Bologna; Art Center, Perugia; Italy
1999	"90th Anniversary of Tel Aviv-Yafo - Contemporary Cityscapes", Tel Aviv Museum of Art
1999	"Common Ground", Weston Gallery, Cincinnati; Riffe Gallery, Columbus; Ohio, United States
2000	"Landscapes in Israel", Museum of Contemporary Art, Roskilde, Denmark; Museum of Art, Trondheim, Norway
2001	"Impressions - Drawing in Israel Now" - The National Drawing Biennale, Artists' House, Jerusalem
2003	"Religion Art and War, Salon Des' Art, London
2003	"Works from collections in Israel", Boca Raton Museum of Modern Art, Florida, United States
2004	"Contemporary Art from Israel" Phenomena Gallery, Seattle, United States
2005	"Magical Place" Dwek Gallery, Convention Center, Mishkenot Sha'ananim, Jerusalem
2006	"Offering Reconciliation", Ramat Gan Museum of Israeli Art; Brandeis University, Boston; World Bank, Washington; Bellevue Museum of Arts, Seattle; United Nations Building, New York; Pomegranate Gallery, New York; Sofa Fair, Chicago
2007	"Desert Generation", the Kibbutz Gallery, Tel Aviv
2008	Guest artists at CIA Center for Contemporary Art, Reykjavik, Iceland
2010	"Rites of Passage" Agripas 12 Cooperative Gallery, Jerusalem
2012	"Desert Traces", the gallery of Kibbutz Be'eri; "Deserted", Eye Lounge Gallery, Phoenix, in collaboration with artists in Arizona, United States
2014	"Blue Grass" – in the frame of "Bamidvar, Devarim" exhibitions, Borochov House, Mishmar HaNegev
2017	"A City of Many Faces – Mundane views in Jerusalem", The Knesset (Israeli Parliament house), Jerusalem

== Personal life ==
Yemima is married to Isaac Ergas and they have three children.
