= Isuzu BU =

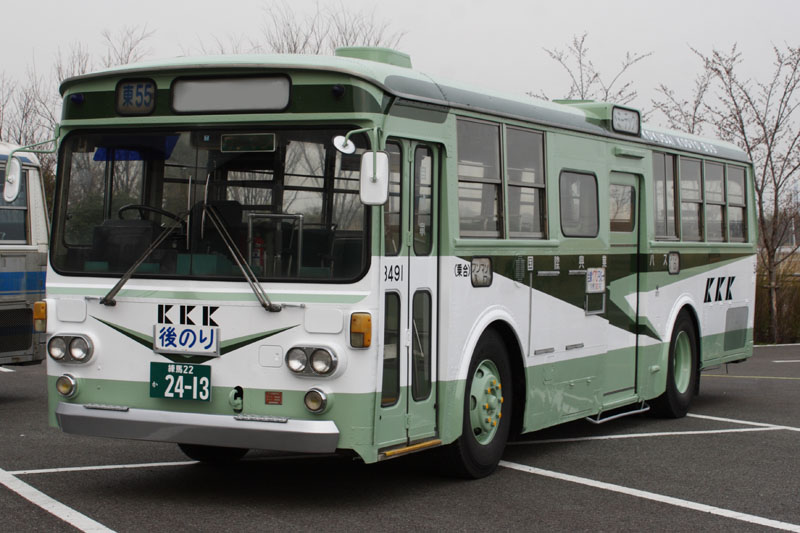

Overview
- Manufacturer: Isuzu
- Production: 1962-1980

Body and chassis
- Class: Buses
- Body style: Low-Bus

Powertrain
- Engine: DH100H, E110H, E120H, D920H

Dimensions
- Wheelbase: 4800 mm, 5000 mm, 5200 mm, 5500 mm, 6000 mm

Chronology
- Predecessor: Isuzu BX
- Successor: Isuzu C

The Isuzu BU-Series is a series of full-size buses built by Isuzu between 1962 and 1980.

== The first generation (1963-1972) ==
In February 1963 the sale as coach began DH100H-BU20 (190 hp) engine with air brakes, retarder installed with horizontal rear underfloor engine. The wheelbase was 5.50 meters, and BU10 5 meters.

With air suspension and (230 hp), the P-end model featured a turbocharger. Four headlights were standard.

- In 1965, the gutters were introduced adapted to construction standards of aircraft and the BU 15 with a wheelbase of 5.2 meters.

- In 1966, the bus with the wheelbase of 4.8 m was BU05.

- In 1967, the pursuit of economic efficiency brought direct to the E110H engine (215 hp), also the D920H-engine (175 hp, 9203 cc) and an increase in output to 195 hp at DH100H engine.

The direct injection engine D920H became the most popular engine in the standard bus variants.

From 1970, the performance of the P-end model increased to (250 hp) with the E120H engine with direct injection.

== The Second generation (1972-1980) ==
- In 1972, there were changes to improve the axle load, length and wheelbase remained unchanged with front overhang, also the engine power increased to 260 hp in the E120H. BU35 is added with 6 m wheelbase.
- In 1973, the front end was tilted forward.
- 1980 Production start and end of the Successor Isuzu C.
