= Isuzu Cubic =

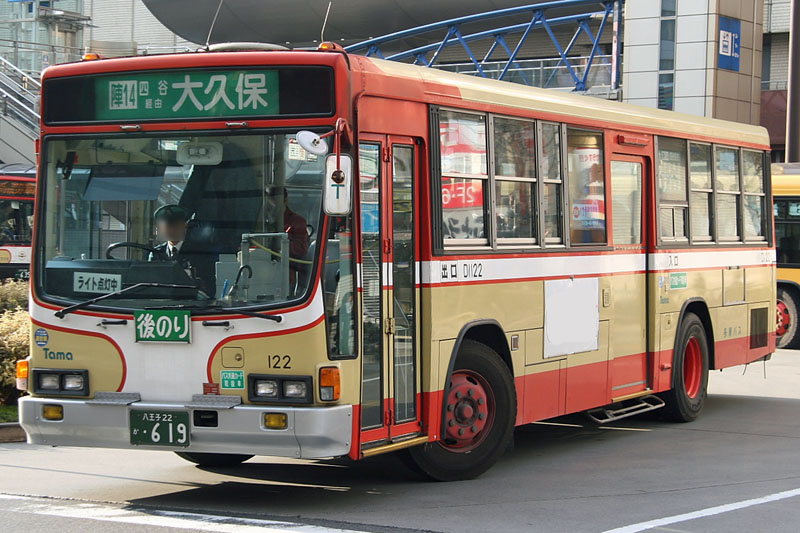

Overview
- Manufacturer: Isuzu
- Production: 1984–2000

Body and chassis
- Class: Complete bus Bus chassis
- Body style: Single-decker bus
- Doors: 2
- Floor type: Step entrance Low floor

Powertrain
- Engine: 6BG1, 6HE1, 6HH1, 6QA2, 6RB2, 6QB2, 6RB2, 8PD1, 8PE1
- Transmission: Isuzu (manual), ZF (automatic)

Dimensions
- Wheelbase: 4.3meter, 4.7meter, 4,8meter, 5.0meter, 5.2meter, 5.3meter, 5.5meter, 5.8meter, 6.0meter
- Length: 11000mm
- Width: 2500mm
- Height: 3000mm

Chronology
- Predecessor: Isuzu C
- Successor: Isuzu Erga

The Isuzu Cubic (kana:いすゞ・キュービック) was a heavy-duty single-decker bus built by Isuzu between 1984 and 2000. The various models of the vehicle were primarily available as a city bus configuration, either a complete bus or a bus chassis.

== Models ==
The Two-step and One-step versions were considered as step-entrance buses, whereas the Non-step version was considered as low-floor buses.

Two-Step

- P-LV214/218/314/318 (1984)
- U-LV218/224/318/324 (1990)
- KC-LV280/380/880 (1995)
- NE-LV288(CNG, 1995)
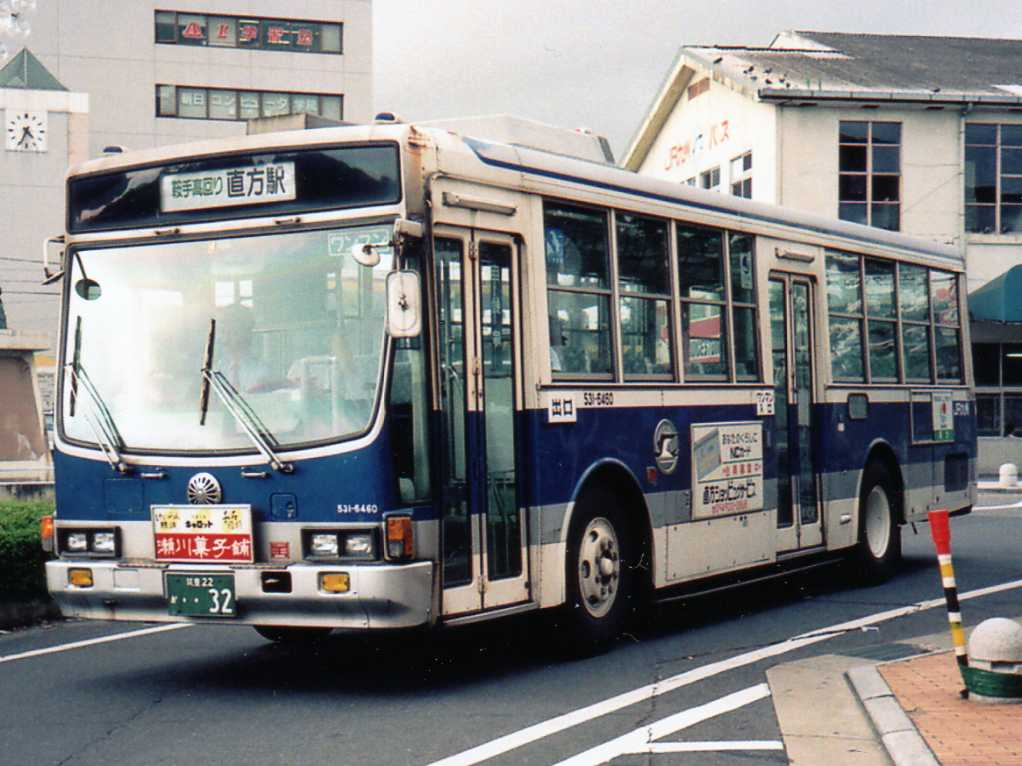
Cubic P-LV314M

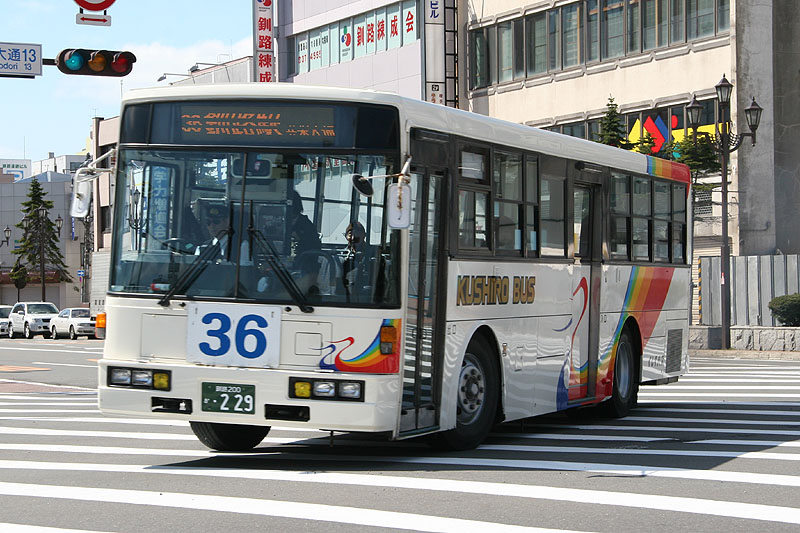
Cubic (FHI 7E body) U-LV324L

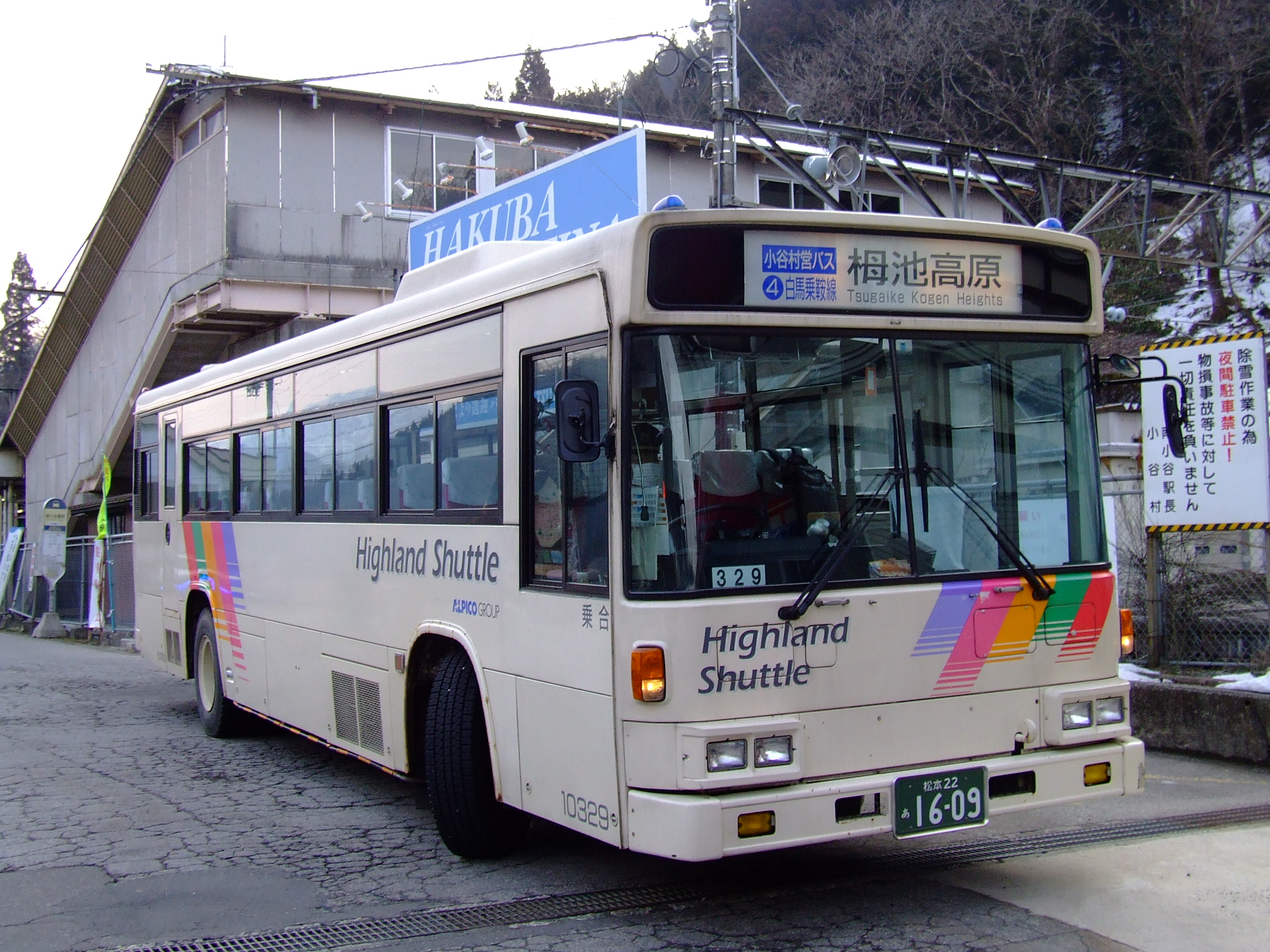
Cubic (NSK 58MC body) U-LV318N

One-Step

- U-LV870L (1992)
- KC-LV880L (1995)

Non-Step

- KC-LV832 (1998)
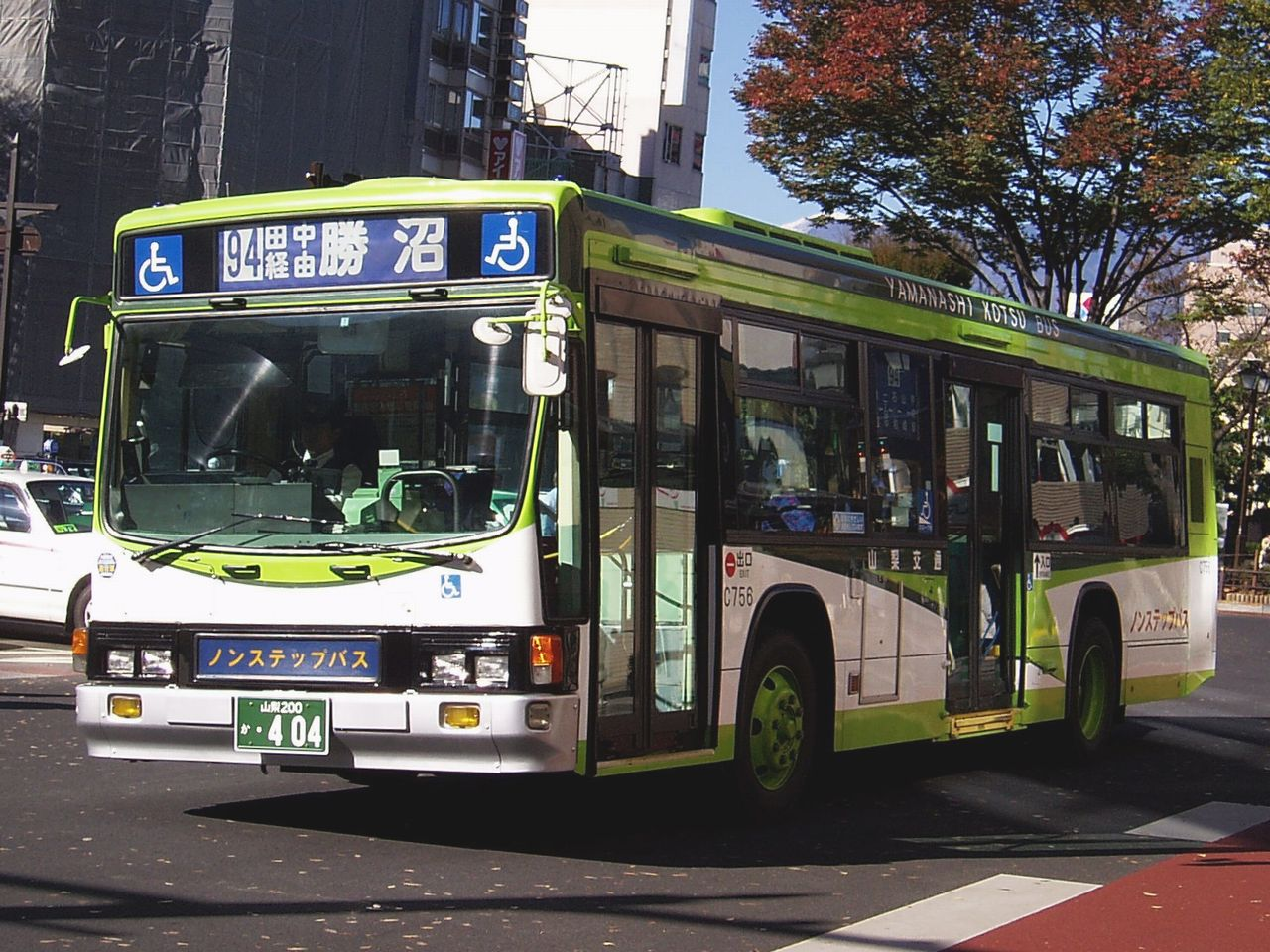
Cubic Non-Step KC-LV832L

== Model lineup ==
- One-Step
- Two-Step
- Non-Step
- CHASSE (Hybrid bus)

== See also ==
- List of buses
