= European Regulators Group for Audiovisual Media Regulators =

The European Regulators Group for Audiovisual Media Services (ERGA) is the advisory body consisting of the heads and high level representatives of the EU national regulatory authorities for audiovisual media services.

Its tasks are:

- To advise and assist the Commission, in its work to ensure a consistent implementation in all Member States of the regulatory framework for audiovisual media services;
- To assist and advise the Commission, as to any matter related to audiovisual media services within the Commission’s competence;
- To provide for an exchange of experience and good practice as to the application of the regulatory framework for audiovisual media services;
- To cooperate and provide its members with the information necessary for the application of the Audiovisual Media Services Directive.

In 2017 Prof. Madeleine de Cock Buning, president of the Dutch Commissariaat voor de Media, was the Chair of ERGA. Damir Hajduk, acting President of the Croatian Council for Electronic Media, and Luboš Kukliš, Chief Executive of the Council for Broadcasting and Retransmission of the Slovak Republic, were the Vice-Chairs of ERGA in 2017. In 2022, ERGA members elected Mr Karim Ibourki, President of Belgian CSA (Conséil superieur de l'audiovisuel), as ERGA Chair. Mr Giacomo Lasorella, President of Italian AGCOM (Autorità per le Garanzia nelle Comunicazioni), took the role of Vice-Chair.

== History ==
ERGA was established by a decision of the European Commission of 3 February 2014. The Members of ERGA met for the first time in Brussels on 4 March 2014. It elected its chair and two vice-chairs and adopted its rules of procedure. In 2016, ERGA published four expert reports on material and territorial jurisdiction, on the independence of national regulatory authorities, and on the protection of minors. These reports consisted of concrete advice to the European Commission regarding the revision of the directive for audiovisual media services. In its proposal to revise this directive of May 2016, the European Commission referred to ERGA's advice, stating: “ERGA has made a positive contribution towards consistent regulatory practice and has provided high level advice to the Commission on implementation matters. This calls for the formal recognition and reinforcement of its role in this Directive. The group should therefore be re-established by virtue of this Directive.” The legislation process to adopt a revised AVMS Directive is still ongoing.

== See also ==
- ERGA Report on the Independence of National Regulatory Authorities
- ERGA Report on the Protection of Minors in a Converged Environment
- ERGA Report on Material Jurisdiction in a Converged Environment
- ERGA Report on Territorial Jurisdiction in a Converged Environment
- ERGA Report on the Provision of Greater Accessibility to Audiovisual Media Services for Person with Disabilities
- ERGA Opinion on AVMSD Proposal
