= ERGA =

The scientific production association ERGA (NPO ERGA) is a Russian manufacturer of magnetic systems and industrial equipment based on them. Production and the central office are located in Kaluga. The key activity is the development and production of equipment for mineral processing, air-gravity separation, integrated solutions for the processing of various wastes and the separation of materials according to electrical properties.

== History ==
The enterprise was established in 1991 on the basis of the Research Institute of Electronic Materials and specialized in the production of rare-earth magnets and special-purpose magnetic systems.

In the 1990s, ERGA mastered the production of magnetic systems, magnetoplastics from rare earth alloys, magnetic separators with manual and automatic cleaning, neodymium magnets for the automotive industry, rod magnetic separators for the food industry, rotors and generators for electric bicycles.

In 2003, the company created its own laboratory of mineral and technological raw materials to conduct research on the material composition of samples and tests, followed by the selection of equipment and technology for processing and enrichment.

In the 2000s, technologies for the production of manual magnetic load grippers based on permanent magnets were developed, the production of industrial metal detectors, magnetic couplings and traverses, magnetic sealing devices for the Ministry of Emergency Situations was launched, the first prototype of WELMA generators based on permanent magnets was produced, and the only line in Russia was launched for the production of permanent rare earth magnets.

In 2017, the expansion of production for the production of industrial magnets and magnetic cleaning complexes began.

In 2019, the enterprise began production of electrostatic separators and air separators. Since 2020, it has been producing integrated solutions for waste processing and mineral processing. The enterprise has representative offices in Novosibirsk and Karaganda (Kazakhstan).

Despite the production of defense significance, since 2014 the company has managed to avoid being included in the sanctions lists of the European Union and the United States.

The main types of manufactured products are magnetic separators, iron separators and other specialized equipment; electrostatic and triboelectrostatic separators; air separators (air); lines for separating materials using magnetic, electrical, air-gravity separation methods; industrial metal detectors; automated systems for remote monitoring of equipment.

Under the trademark WELMA, the company manufactures high-speed synchronous electric machines based on permanent magnets used in the aerospace industry, power engineering, turbocompressors and cryogenic technology.

The manufactured equipment is operated at mining, food, oil and gas, construction, chemical and recycling industries.
