= Isuzu Erga =

Heavy-duty single decker bus

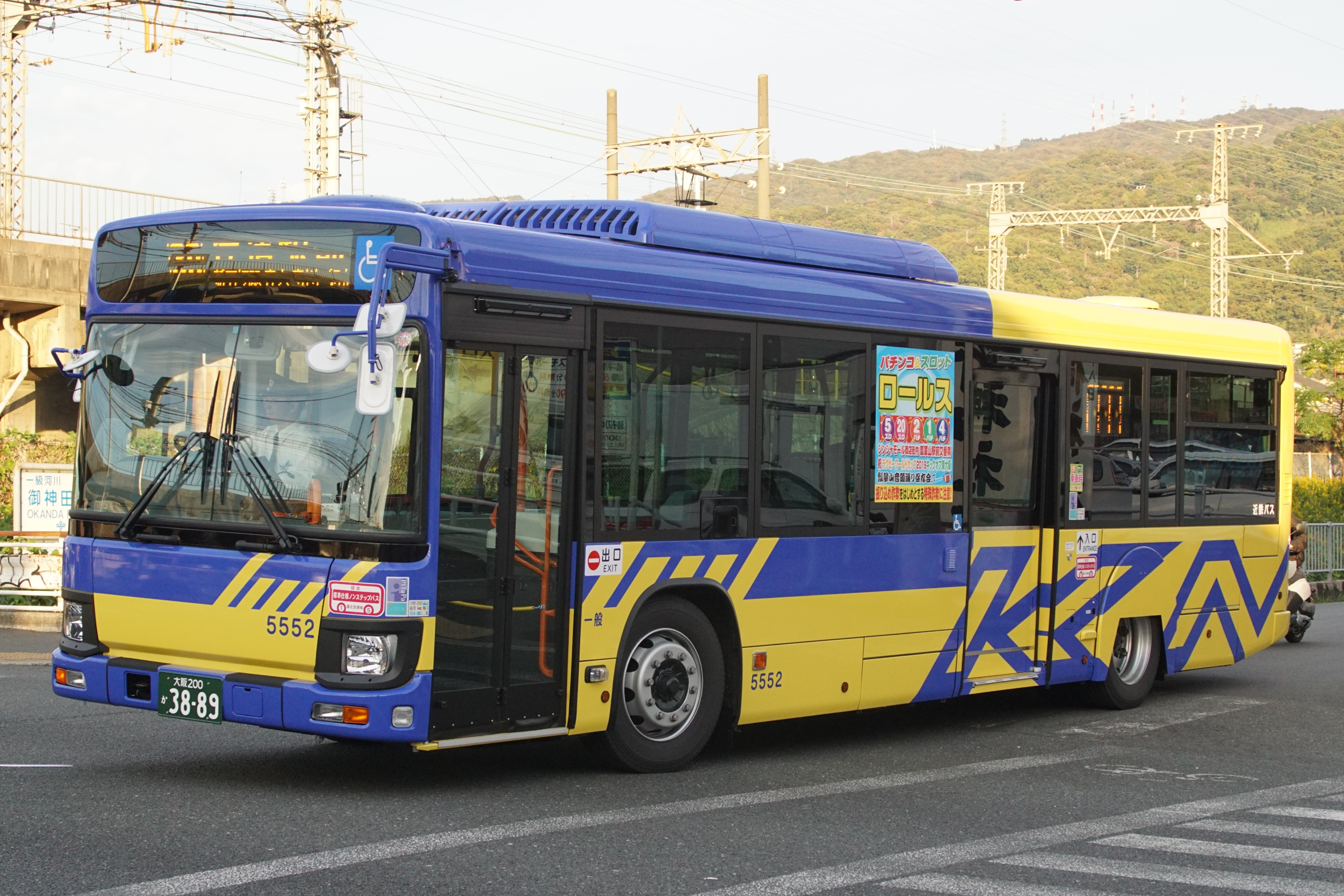
- Isuzu Erga of Kintetsu Bus

Overview
- Manufacturer: J-Bus
- Also called: Hino Blue Ribbon II
- Production: 2000–present

Body and chassis
- Class: Complete bus Bus chassis
- Body style: Single-decker bus
- Doors: 1 or 2
- Floor type: Step entrance Low floor
- Related: Hino Blue Ribbon II

Powertrain
- Engine: 8PE1, 8PF1(V-8), 6HK1, 6HF1, 6HH1, 6HA1 (straight 6), 4HK1, A05C (straight 4)
- Transmission: 5-speed manual, ZF/Allison 5-speed automatic 6-speed Semi-automatic, Alison 6-speed automatic

Dimensions
- Wheelbase: 4.8m, 5.3m, 5.8m, 6.0m
- Length: 10.5m, 11.3m
- Width: 2.5m
- Height: 3.2m

Chronology
- Predecessor: Isuzu Cubic

The Isuzu Erga (kana:いすゞ・エルガ) is a heavy-duty single-decker bus produced by Isuzu through the J-Bus joint venture. It is primarily available as a public bus in either a complete bus or a bus chassis. It is built by J-Bus from Japan either as a step-entrance bus (One-step and Two-step) or a low-floor bus (Non-step (Type A and Type B)).

== First generation (2000-2015) ==
The styling is completely different from the Cubic. The Isuzu Erga has a deep double-curvature windscreen and a rounded roof dome (more rounded as compared to the Cubic) with a separately mounted destination display. Its Hino-rebadged version is the Hino Blue Ribbon II.

Non-step (Type A), One-step and Two-step

- KL-LV280L1/N1/Q1 (2000) - 8PE1 engine (CNG: 8PF1)
- KK/KL-LT233J2 (2000) - 6HH1 engine
- PJ-LV234L1/N1/Q1 (2004) - 6HK1 engine (CNG: 8PF1)
- PKG/PDG-LV234L2/N2/Q2 (2007) - 6HK1 engine (CNG: 6HF1)
- LKG/LDG-LV234L3/N3/Q3 (2010) - 6HK1 engine (CNG: 6HF1)
- QPG/QKG/QDG-LV234L3/N3/Q3 (2012) - 6HK1 engine (QDG CNG: 6HF1)
- QQG-LV234L3/N3 (2012) - 6HK1 engine with Eaton's parallel hybrid system and automatic/manual transmission
- QSG-LV234L3/N3 (2015) - 6HK1 engine with Eaton's parallel hybrid system and AMT transmission

Non-step (Type B)

- KL-LV834 (2000-2004) - 6HK1 engine (CNG: 6HA1) and ZF Ecomat as standard.
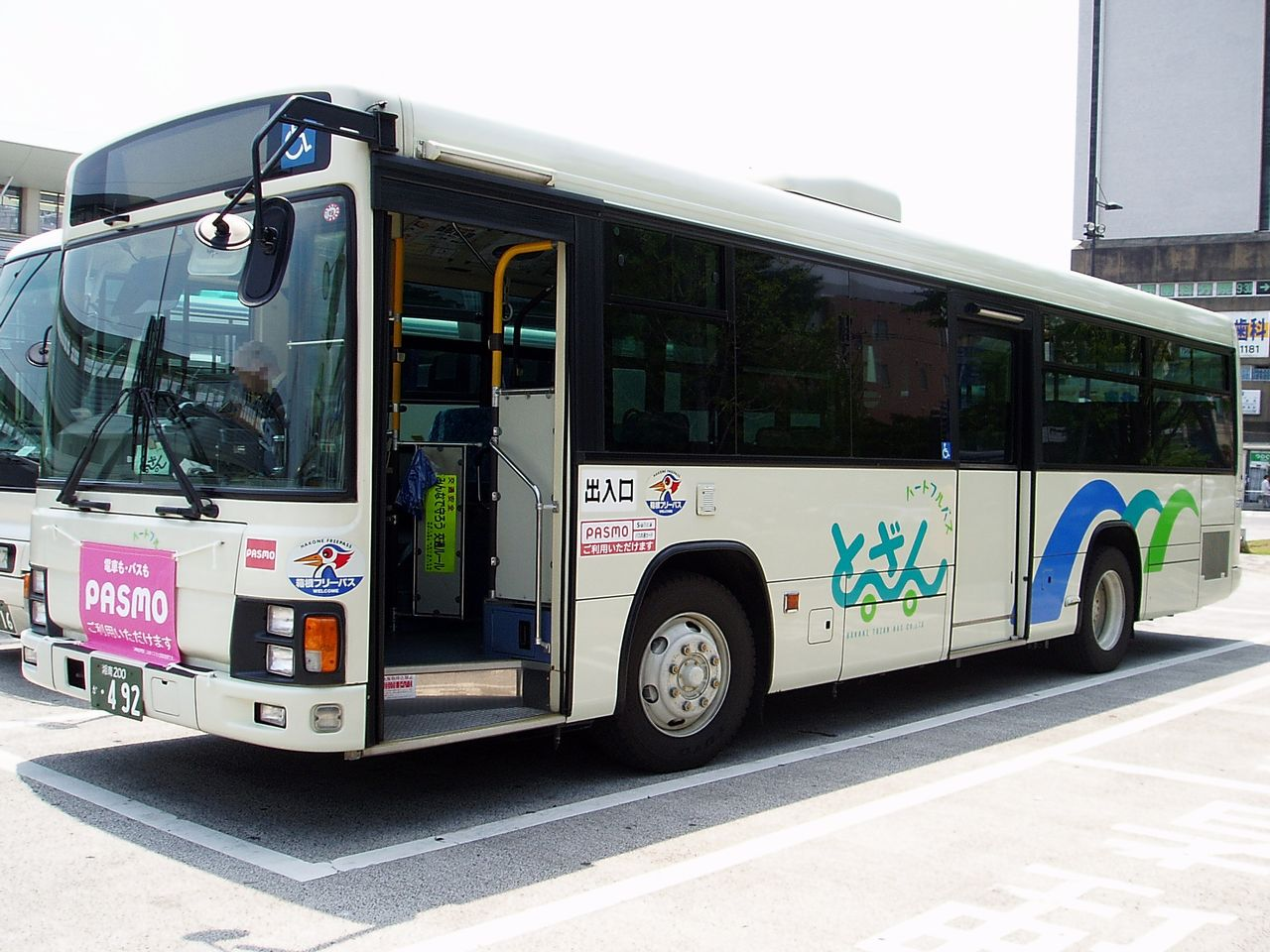
ERGA One-Step KL-LV280L1

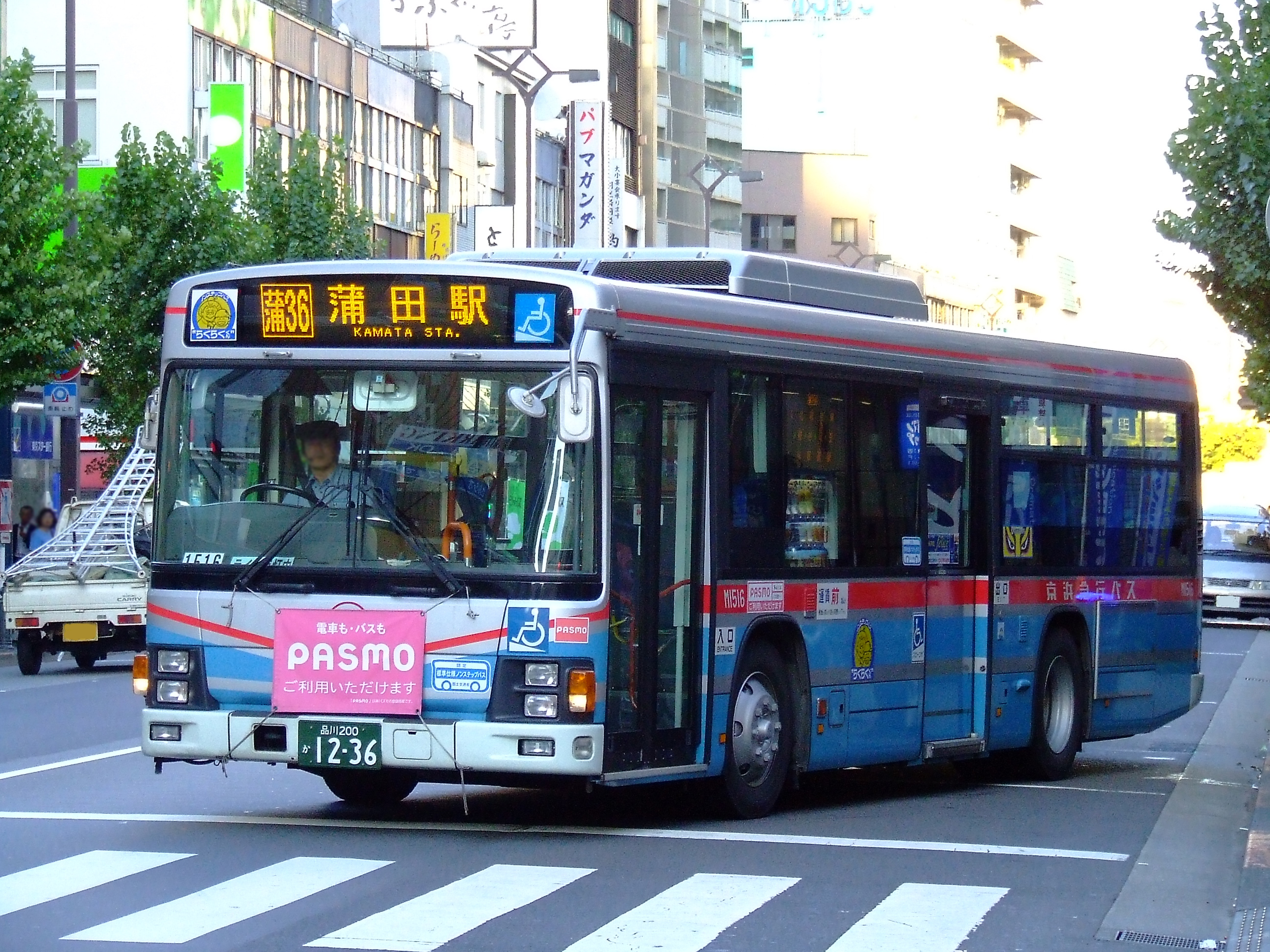
ERGA Non-Step Type-A PJ-LV234L1

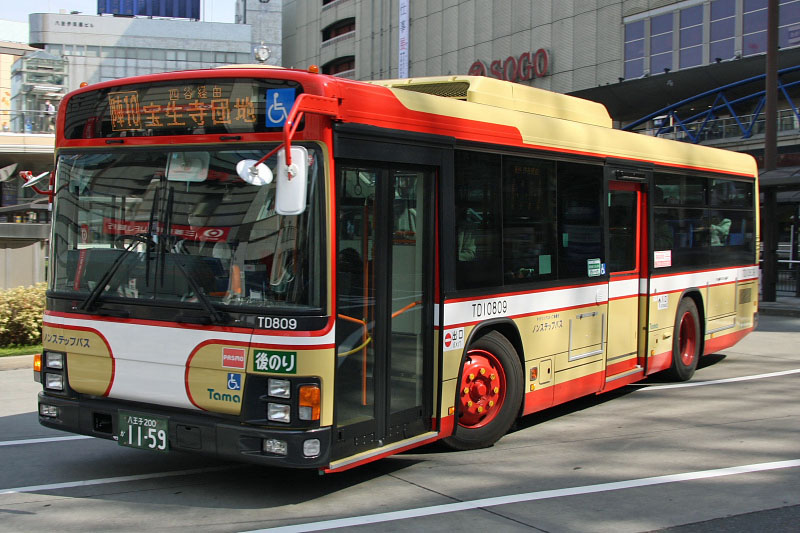
ERGA Non-step Type-A PKG-LV234L2

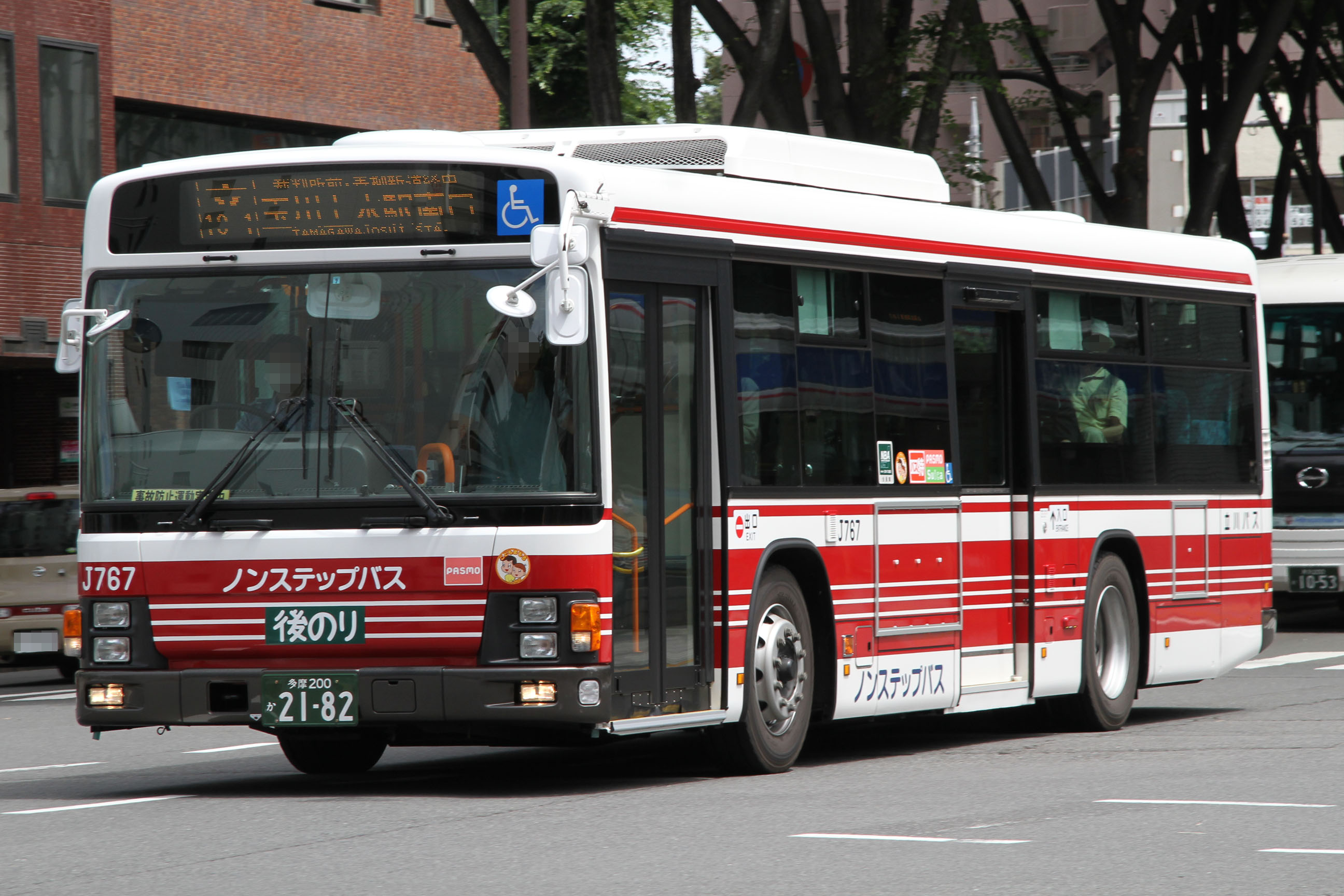
ERGA Non-step Type-A LKG-LV234L3

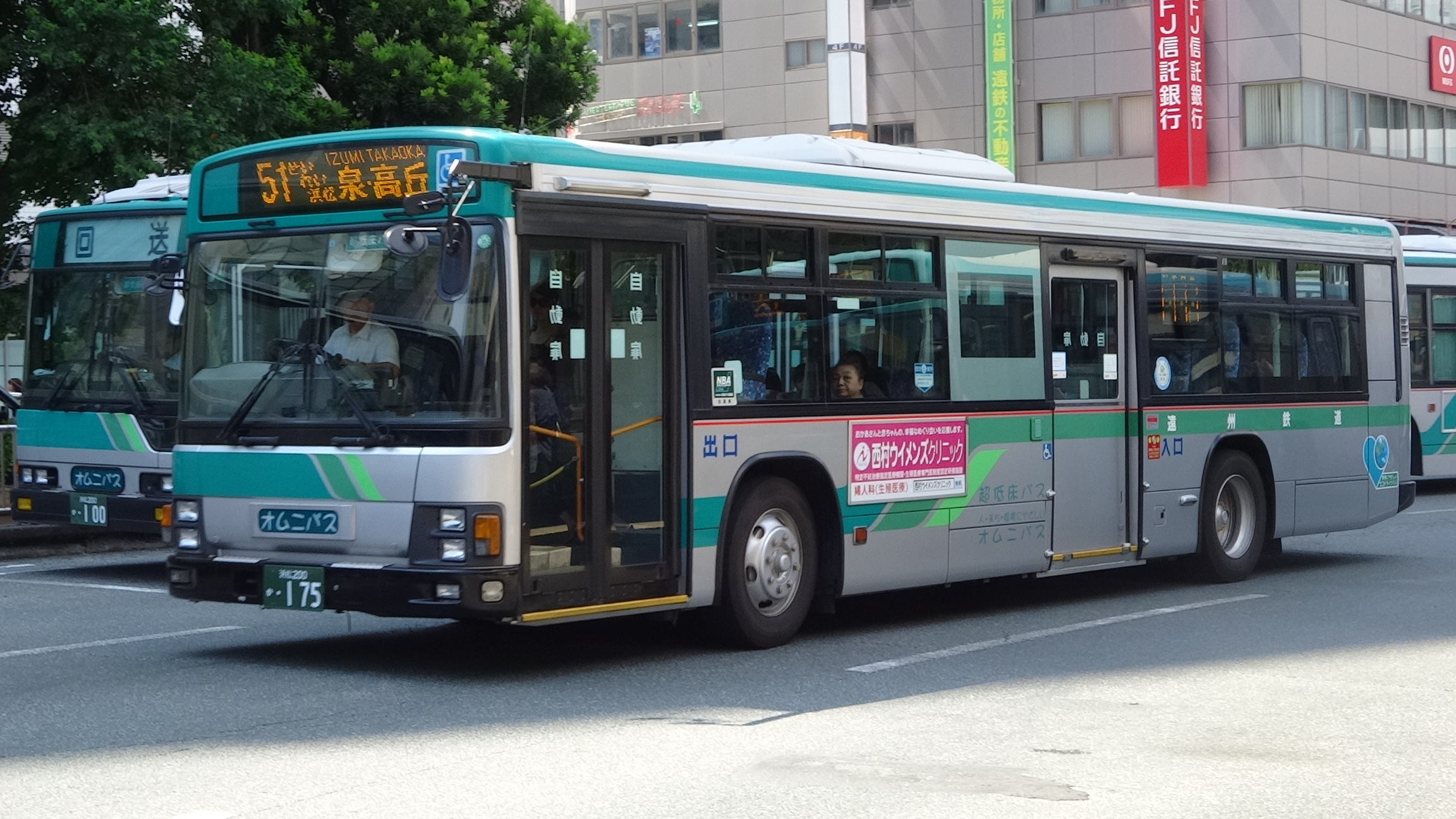
ERGA Non-Step Type-B KL-LV834N1

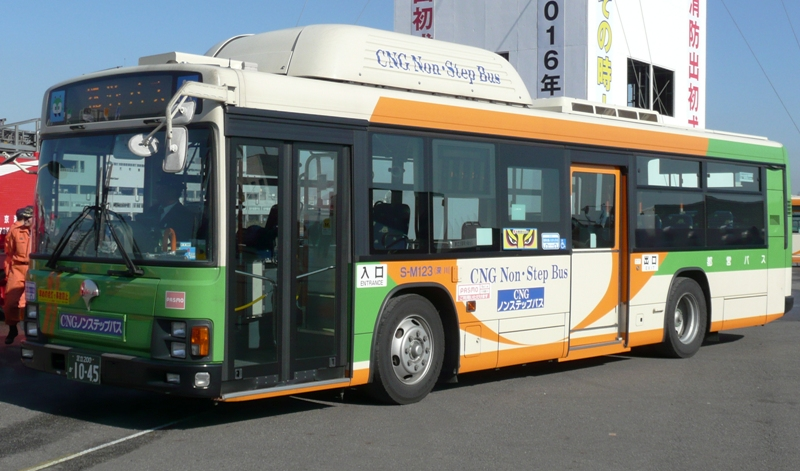
ERGA Non-Step Type-B CNG KL-LV834L1(Custom)

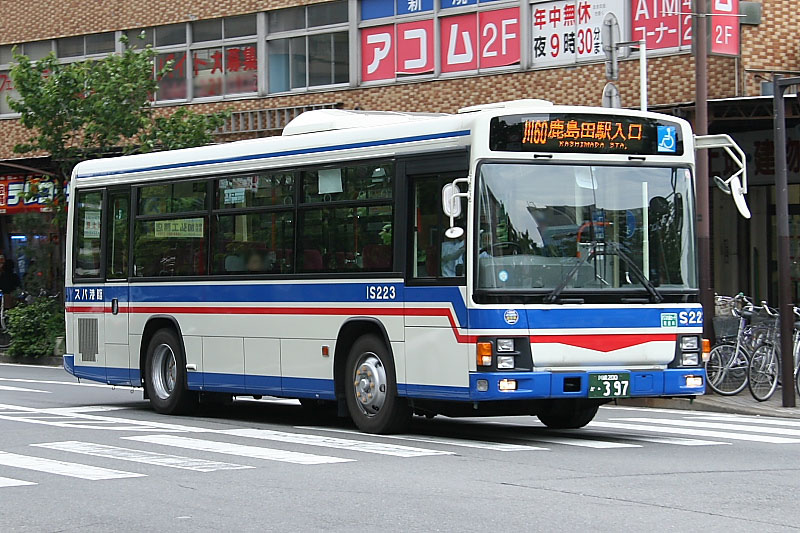
ERGA LT One-Step KL-LT233J2

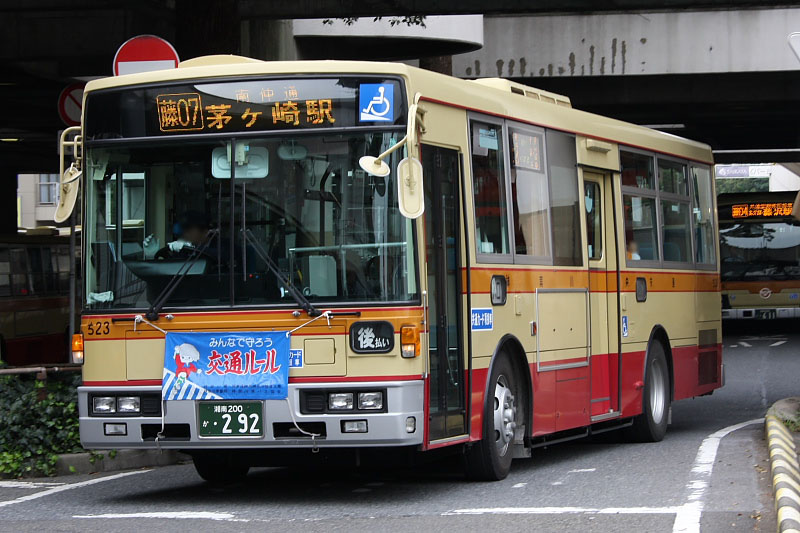
ERGA One-Step KL-LV280L1 (FHI R17E body)

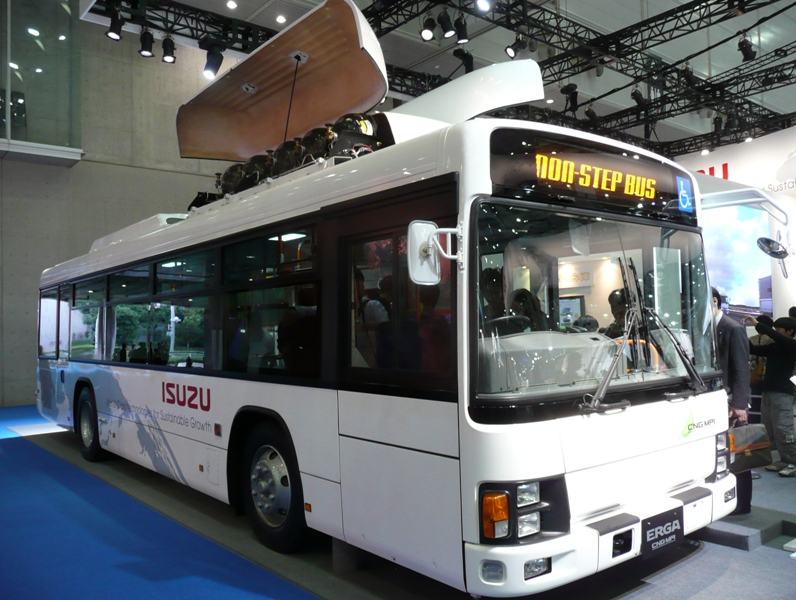
ERGA Non-Step Type-A CNG PDG-LV234L2(Custom)

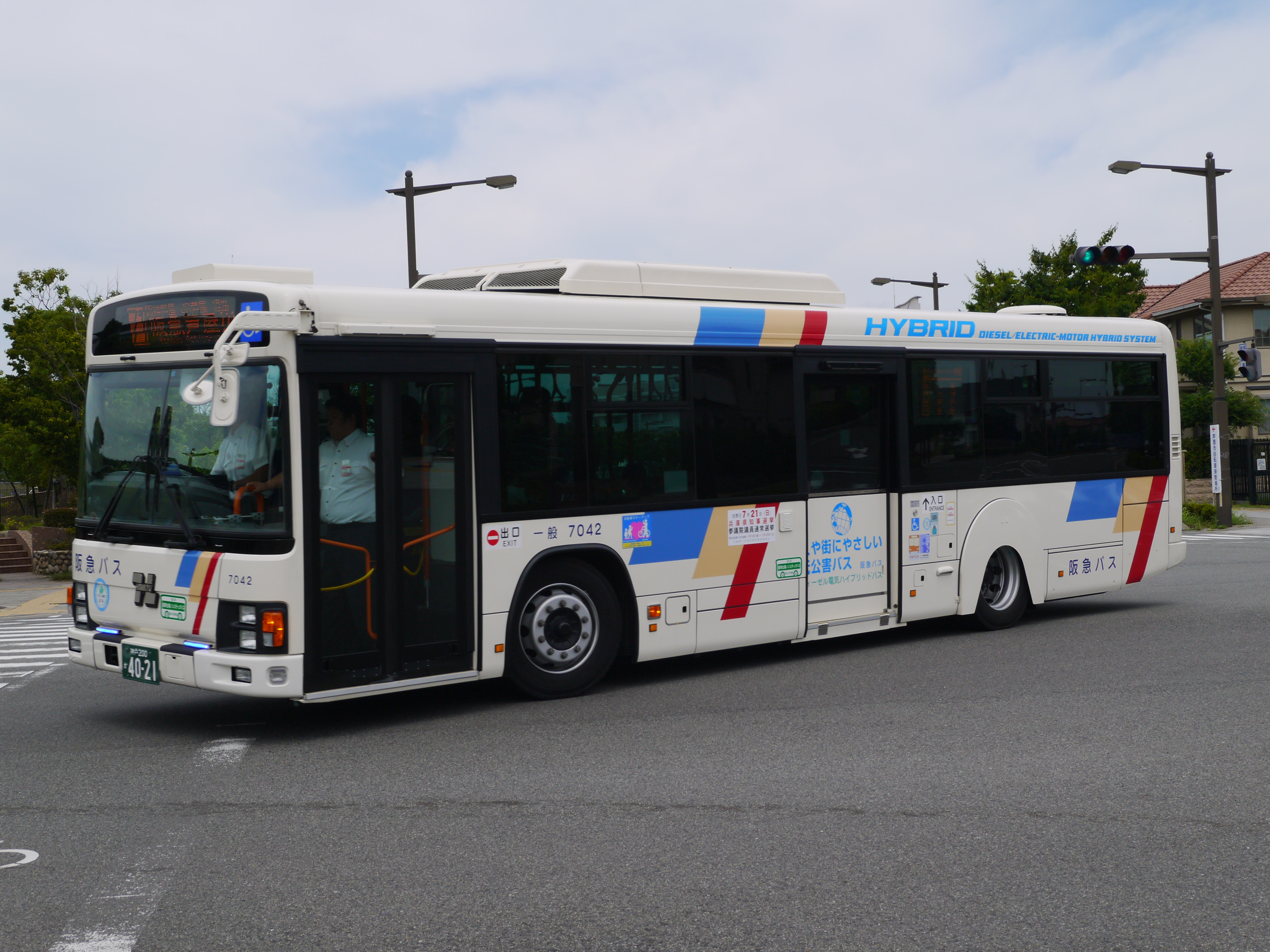
ERGA Hybrid QQG-LV234L3

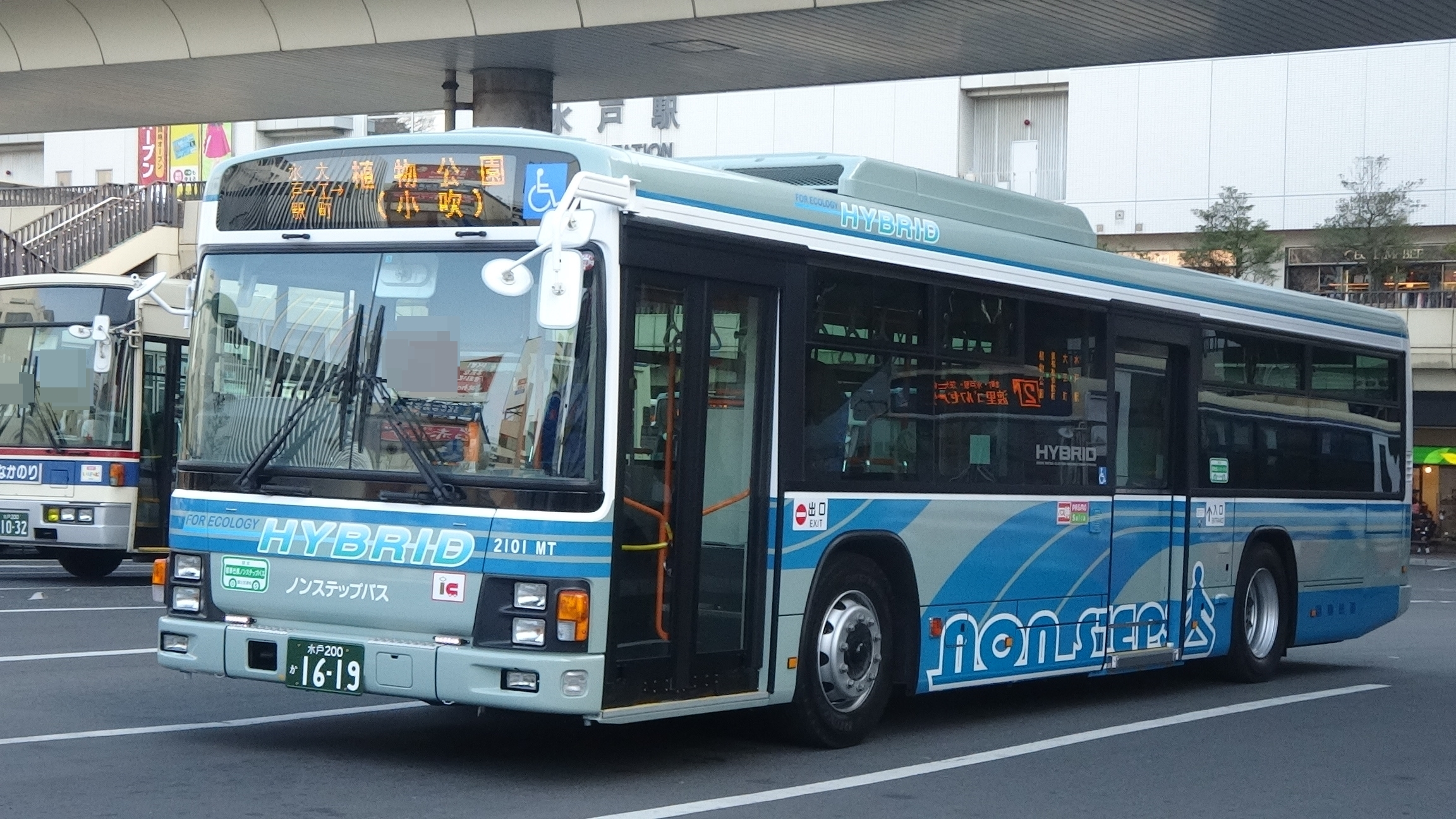
ERGA Hybrid QSG-LV234N3

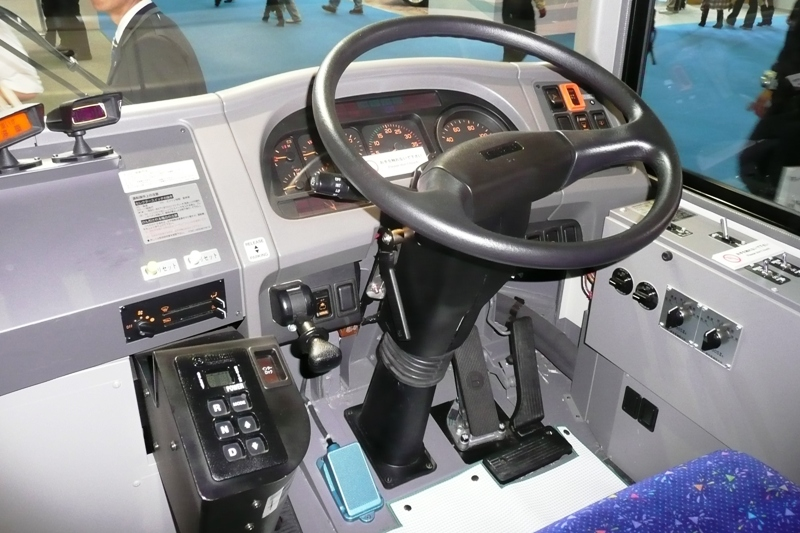
First generation ERGA cockpit

== Second generation (2015–present) ==
Non-step

- 2TG/2PG/2KG/2DG-LV290-2 (2017) - 4HK1 engine
- 2SG-HL2ANBD/SBD (2017)- A05C engine with Hino's parallel hybrid system and AMT transmission
- 2TG/2PG/2KG/2DG-LV290-3 (2019) - 4HK1 engine
- 2SG-HL2ANBD/SBD (2019)- A05C engine with Hino's parallel hybrid system and AMT transmission (Dead_man's_switch included)
- 2TG/2PG/2KG/2DG-LV290-4 (2022) - 4HK1 engine
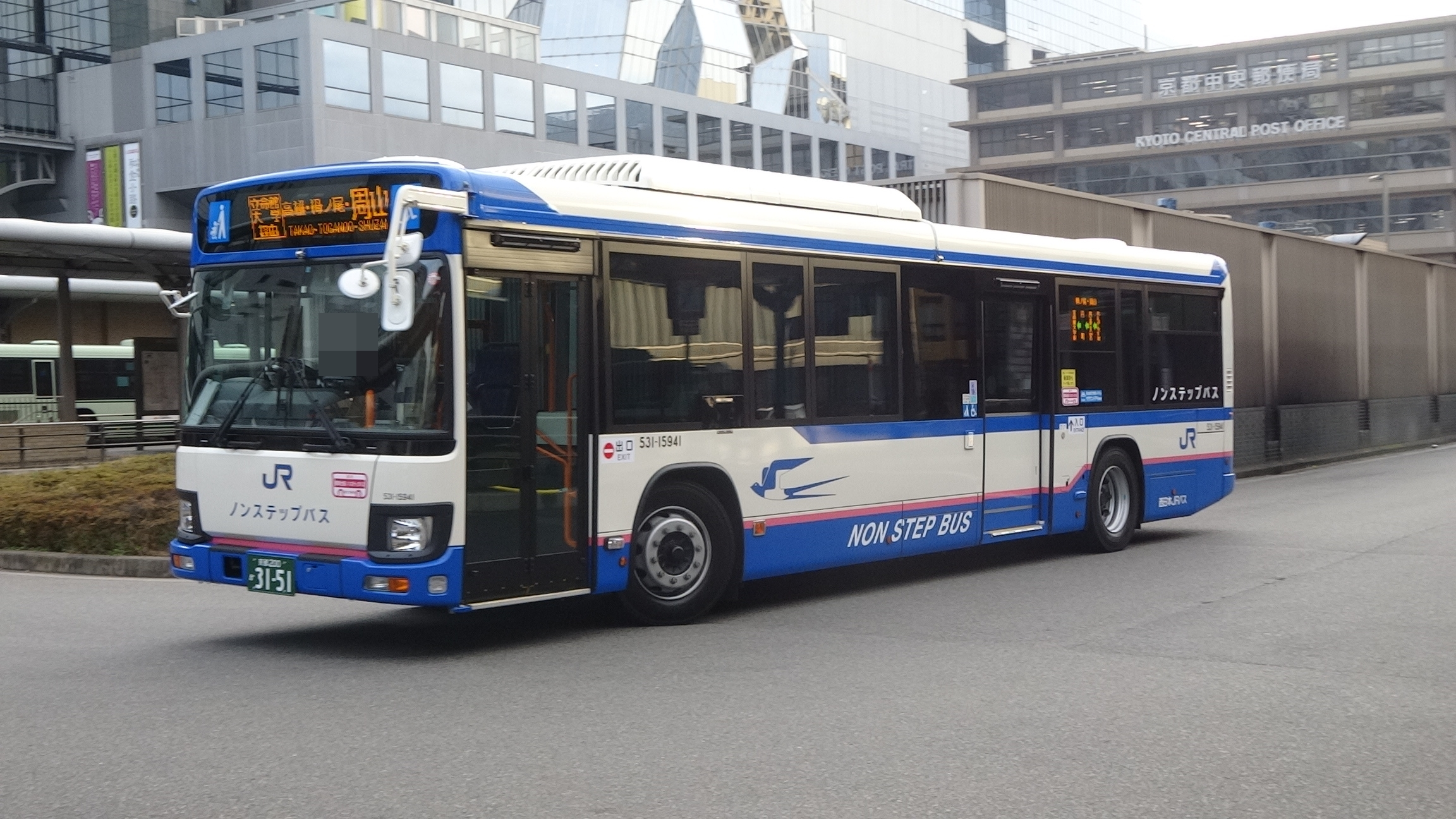
ERGA Non-Step QPG-LV290Q1

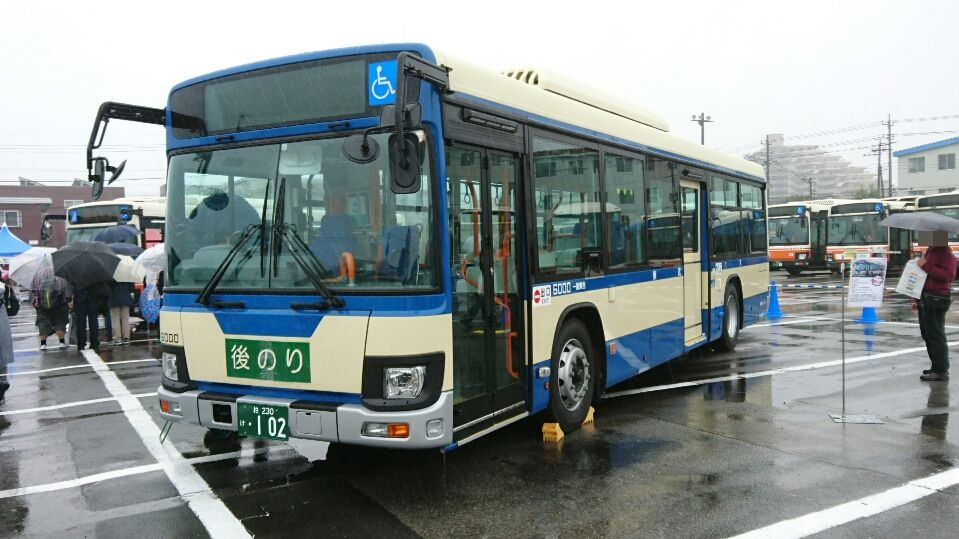
ERGA Non-Step 2KG-LV290N2

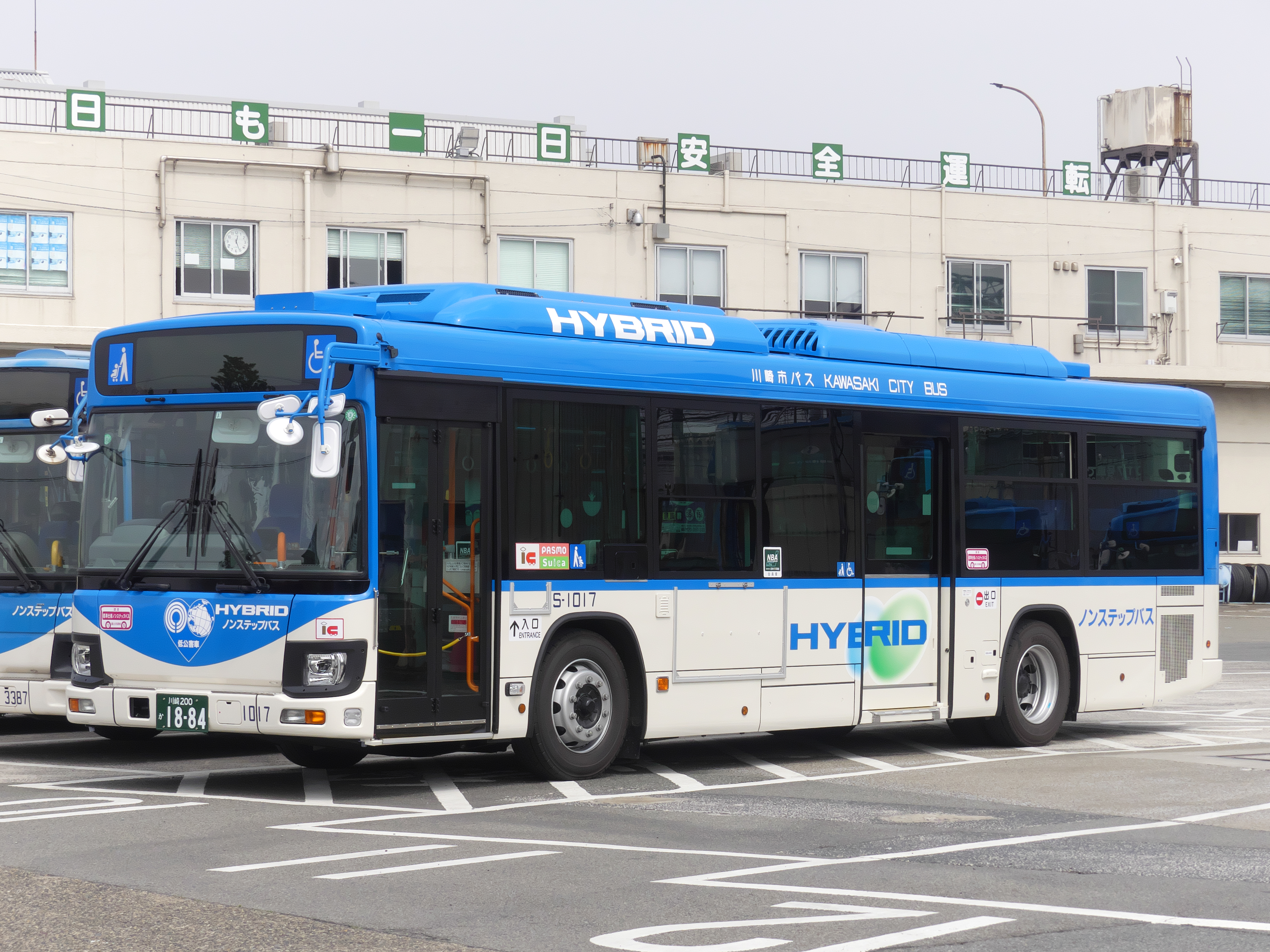
ERGA Hybrid Non-Step 2SG-HL2ANBD

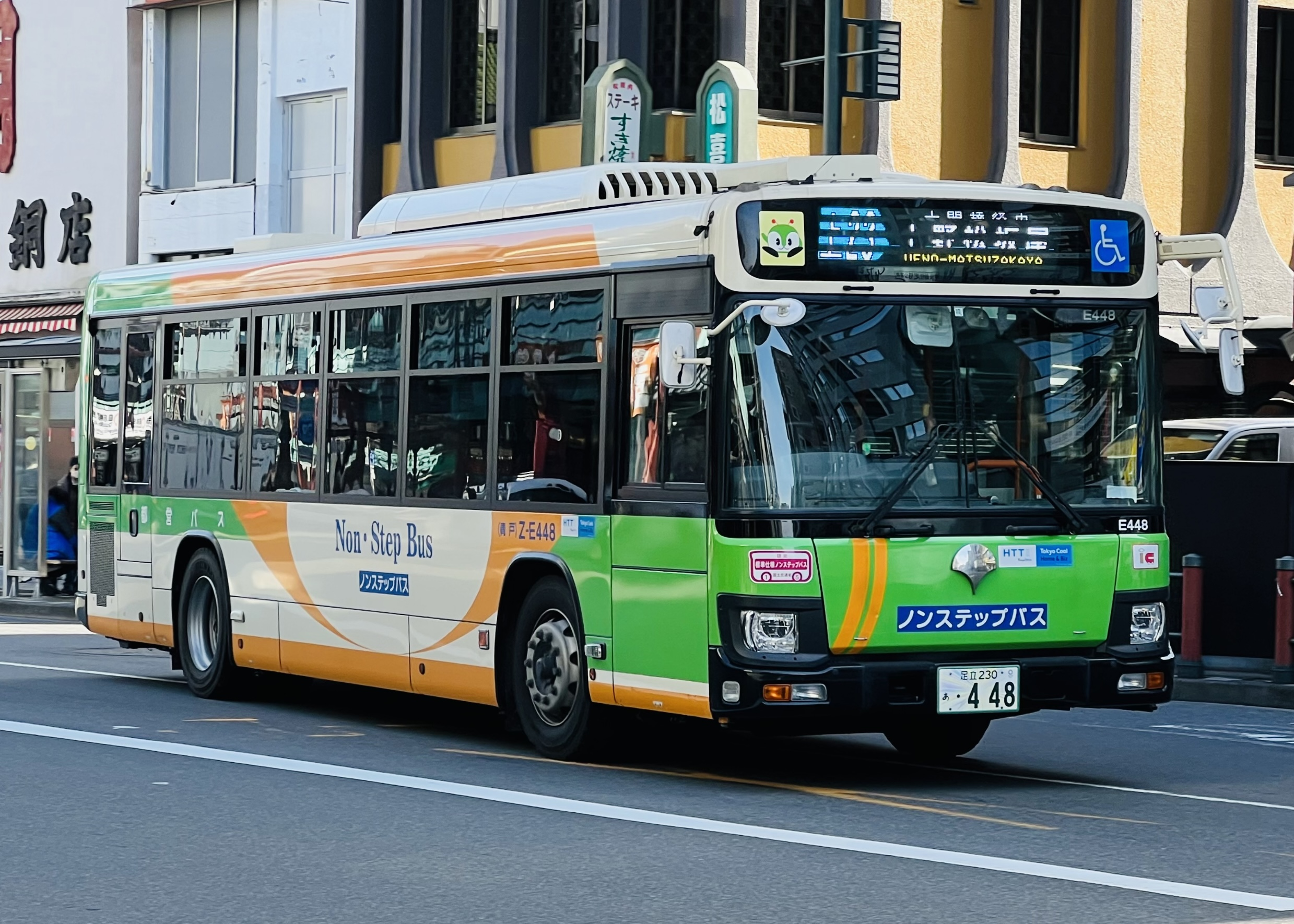
ERGA Non-Step 2PG-LV290N3

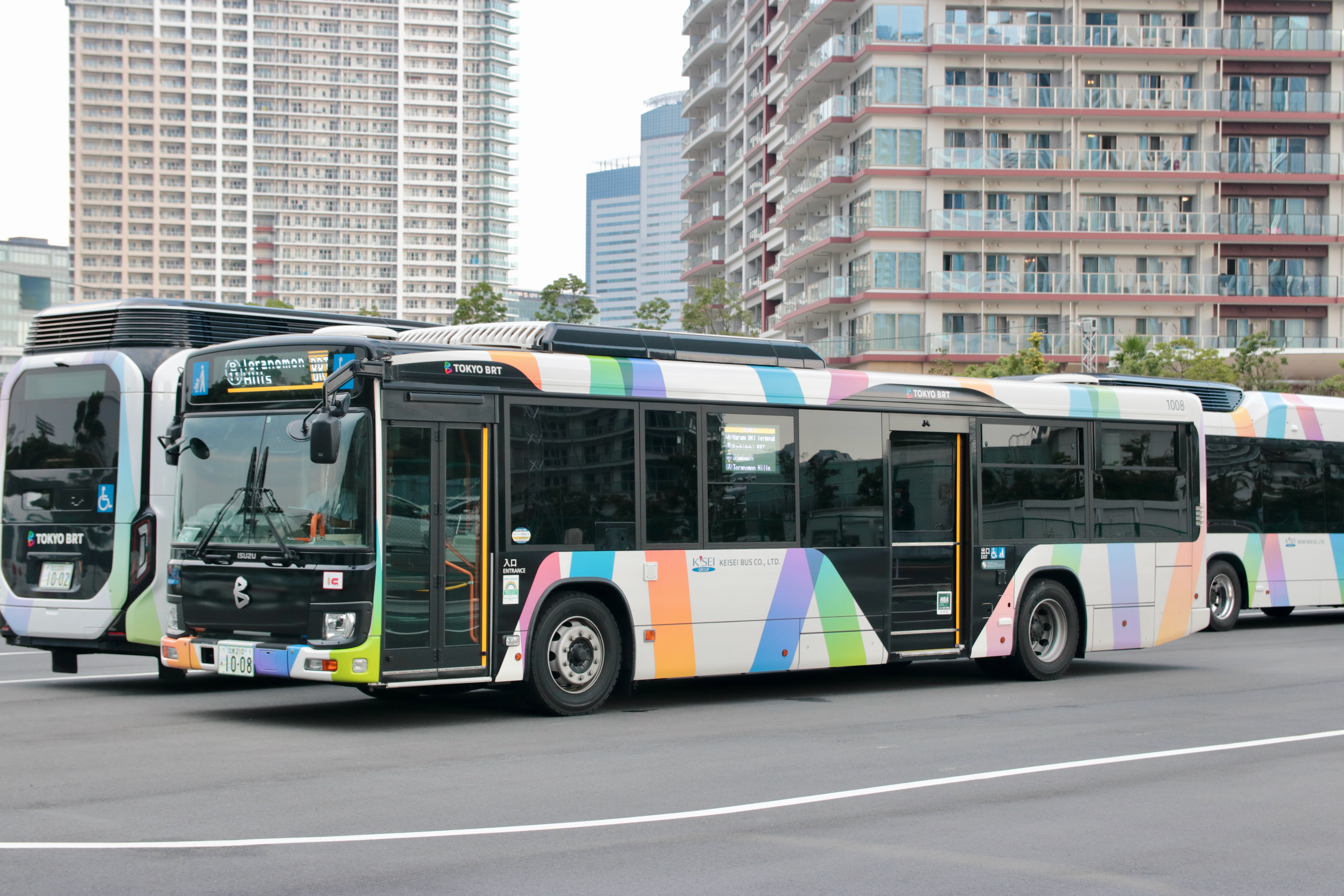
ERGA Non-Step 2PG-LV290Q3

== Isuzu Erga Duo ==
ERGA DUO, the first mass-produced articulated bus made in Japan, debuted on May 27, 2019, along with the Blue Ribbon Hybrid articulated bus. The hybrid mechanism is the same as the HL series Erga hybrid.

The model is called LX525Z1. It is the first bus in the world with EDSS (Emergency Driving Stop System). The bus uses A09C 6-cylinder engine, which creates 360 horsepower at 1800rpm, and Hino Motors 7AMT transmission as the GVW exceeds 20 tons.

Like the Hino blue ribbon hybrid articulated bus, the brakes are the only all-wheel disc brakes in Japanese large buses.

On August 2, 2022, along with the Erga Hybrid, shipments were suspended under the guidance of the Ministry of Land, Infrastructure, Transport and Tourism due to the Hino Motors engine fraud problem.

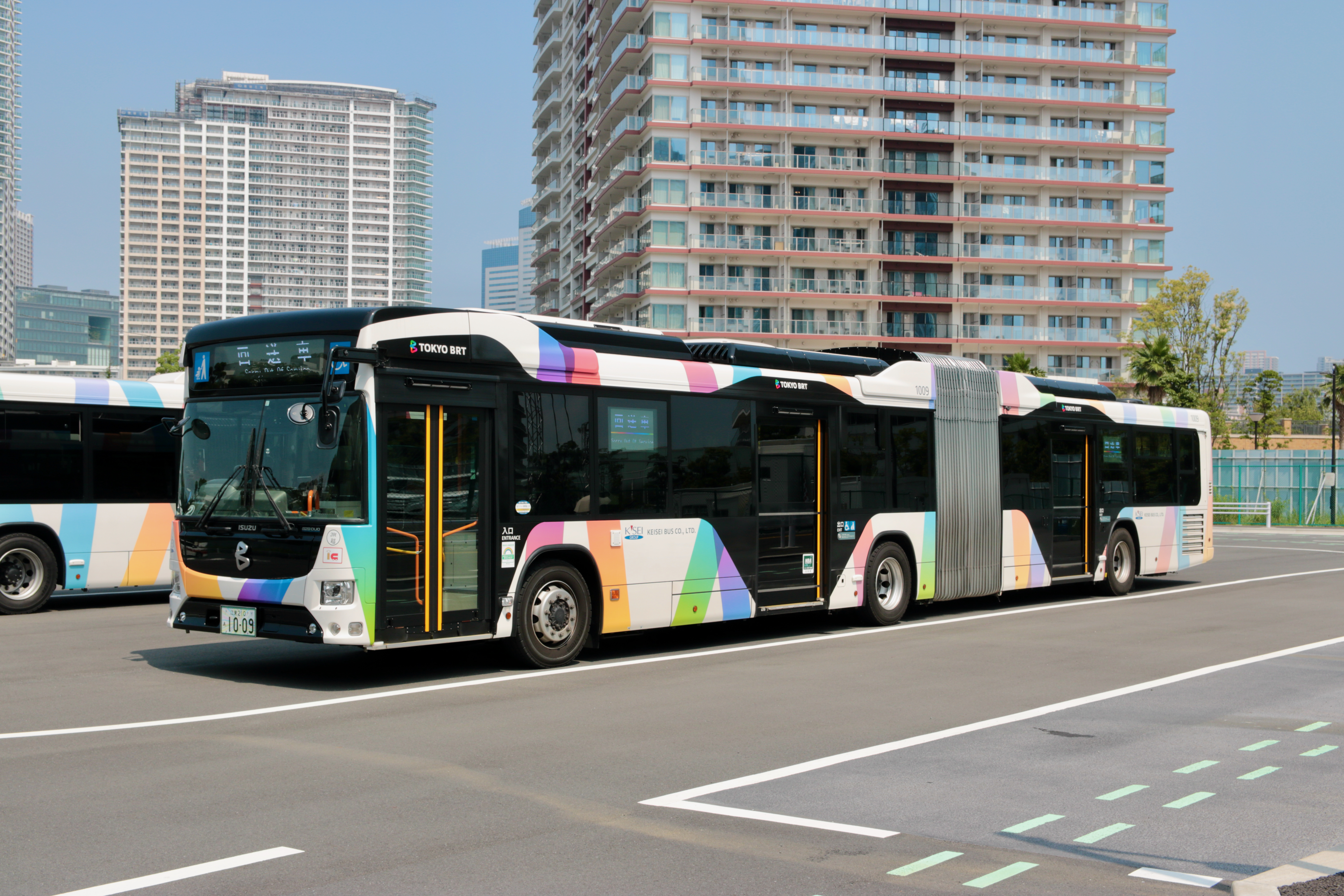
Erga Duo KX525Z1

== Isuzu Erga EV ==
The Isuzu Erga EV debuted on 28 May 2024, is the first-time Electric bus in Japan.

- ZAC-LV828L1
Erga EV

== Isuzu Erga FCV ==
The Isuzu Erga FCV debuted on 5 October 2026, along with second-generation of Toyota Sora, is the first-time Fuel cell bus in Japan.

== Isuzu Erga-J ==
The Isuzu Erga-J is a rebadged Hino Rainbow HR. It has a rounded roof dome similar to the Erga with a deep double-curvature windscreen and a separately mounted destination display.

- KL-HR1JNEC (2000)
- PK-HR7JPAC (2004)
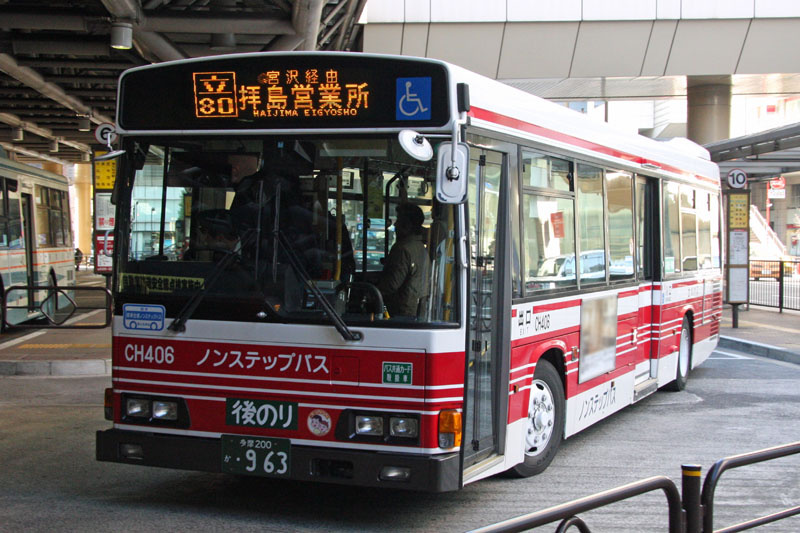
Erga-J PK-HR7JPAC

== Model lineup ==
- One-Step
- Two-Step
- Non-Step Type-A
- Non-Step Type-B

== See also ==
- List of buses
- Hino Blue Ribbon, the J-bus product that look almost the same
- Mitsubishi Fuso Aero Star, its main competitor
