= Honda Orthia =

Compact station wagon manufactured by Honda for the Japanese market

Honda Orthia (EL1/EL2/EL3)
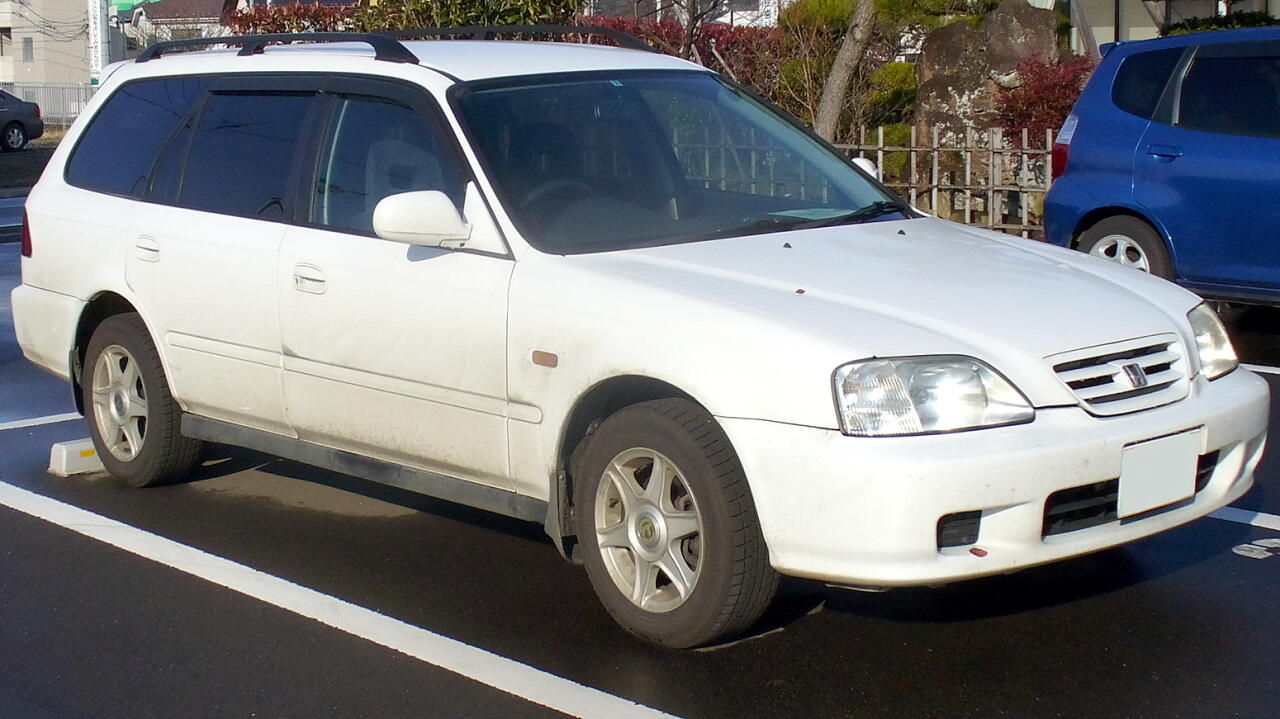
- 1996–1999 Honda Orthia GX

Overview
- Manufacturer: Honda
- Model code: EL (Orthia); EY (Partner)
- Also called: Honda Partner
- Production: March 1996 – January 2002 (Orthia); March 1996 – March 2006 (Partner)
- Assembly: Japan: Suzuka, Mie

Body and chassis
- Class: Compact car
- Body style: 5-door station wagon
- Layout: Front-engine, front-wheel-drive; Front-engine, four-wheel-drive
- Related: Honda Civic (sixth generation)

Powertrain
- Engine: Petrol: 1.3 L D13 I4 (Partner); 1.5 L D15 I4 (Partner); 1.6 L D16 I4 (Partner); 1.8 L B18B I4 (Orthia); 2.0 L B20B I4 (Orthia)
- Power output: 91 PS (67 kW; 90 hp) (1.3 L); 105 PS (77 kW; 104 hp) (1.5 L); 120 PS (88 kW; 118 hp) (1.6 L); 140 PS (103 kW; 138 hp) (1.8 L); 145–150 PS (107–110 kW; 143–148 hp) (2.0 L)
- Transmission: 5-speed manual; 4-speed automatic

Dimensions
- Wheelbase: 2,620 mm (103.1 in)
- Length: 4,570 mm (179.9 in); 4,635 mm (182.5 in) (GX-S)
- Width: 1,695 mm (66.7 in)
- Height: 1,435–1,500 mm (56.5–59.1 in)
- Kerb weight: 1,170–1,300 kg (2,579–2,866 lb) (Orthia); 1,030–1,190 kg (2,271–2,624 lb) (Partner)

Chronology
- Predecessor: Honda Civic Shuttle (Orthia); Honda Pro (Partner)
- Successor: Honda Airwave/Partner; Honda Stream

The Honda Orthia (Japanese: ホンダ・オルティア, Honda Orutia) is a compact station wagon manufactured by Honda exclusively for the Japanese market between 1996 and 2002. Based on the sixth generation Civic chassis, it was introduced in February 1996 as what Honda called a "Sport Utility Wagon" and initially sold at both Honda Verno and Honda Primo dealerships. The name "orthia", a variation of the Greek word orithyia, comes from Artemis Orthia in Greek mythology.

The Orthia was available with either front-wheel drive or four-wheel drive configurations. It is powered with either 1,834 cc B18B DOHC inline-four or 1,972 cc B20B DOHC inline-four engines.

Orthias were made available during the 1996 launch from either Primo or Verno dealerships. 1996 Models feature a "V" or "P" badge on the trunk to denote between Verno and Primo. The Orthia Verno models also feature Amber/Red taillights and round type fog lights, while Primo models feature Clear/Red taillights and rectangular fog lights. The following trims were available at launch:

- GX (Chassis code EL1. Available in a front-wheel drive configuration with manual or automatic transmission options and the 1.8L DOHC B18B engine). This trim is considered the base model, but despite this is features amenities such as automatic air conditioning, power automatic windows, and a power retracting antenna.
- 2.0GX (Chassis code EL2. Available in a front-wheel drive configuration with manual or automatic transmission options and the 2.0L DOHC B20B engine).
- 2.0GX 4WD(Chassis code EL3 available in a four-wheel drive configuration with an automatic transmission and the 2.0L DOHC B20B).
- 2.0GX-S (Chassis code EL3 available in four-wheel drive configuration with an automatic transmission and the 2.0L DOHC B20B). This model features a two tone paintjob, wood grain patterned interior trim, power folding door mirrors, and satellite navigation.

On February 13th, 1997 the Orthia went under a minor facelift with driver's and front passenger's SRS airbags installed as standard. The Orthia Primo also was discontinued with no future Orthia models featuring "V" or "P" badge on the trunk.

On January 22nd 1998, Honda announced improvements to the Orthia. These included

- Factory tinted heat and UV absorbent glass fitted as standard
- Power folding door mirrors fitted as standard
- A new trim option, the 2.0GX-S Aero

The 2.0GX-S Aero introduced for the 1998 model year included a special lip kit, carbon fiber patterned interior trim, special red and black pattern seats, a 3 spoke leather trimmed steering wheel, color matched fog light protectors, and was available in either front-wheel drive and four-wheel drive.

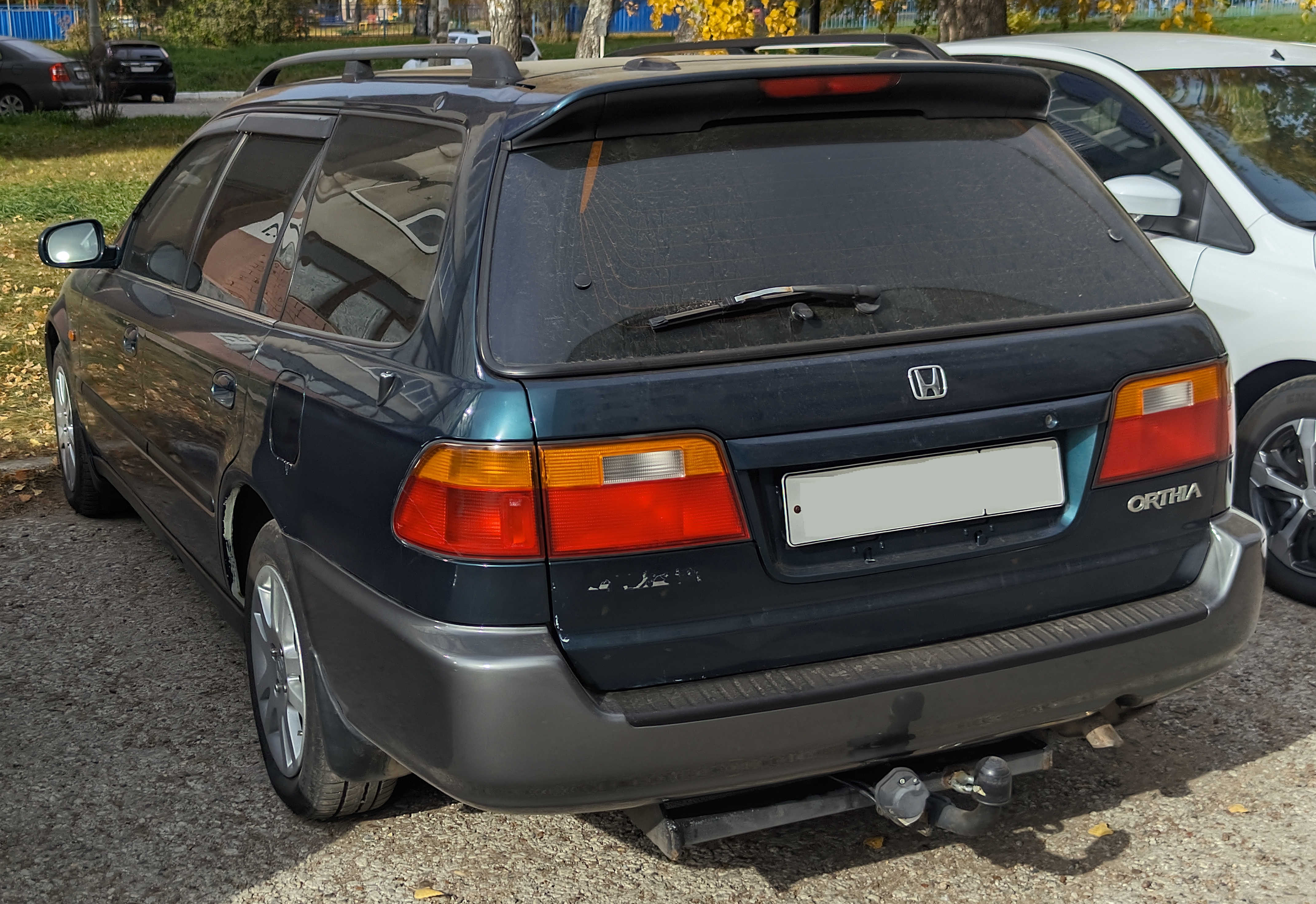
1996–1999 Honda Orthia V GX

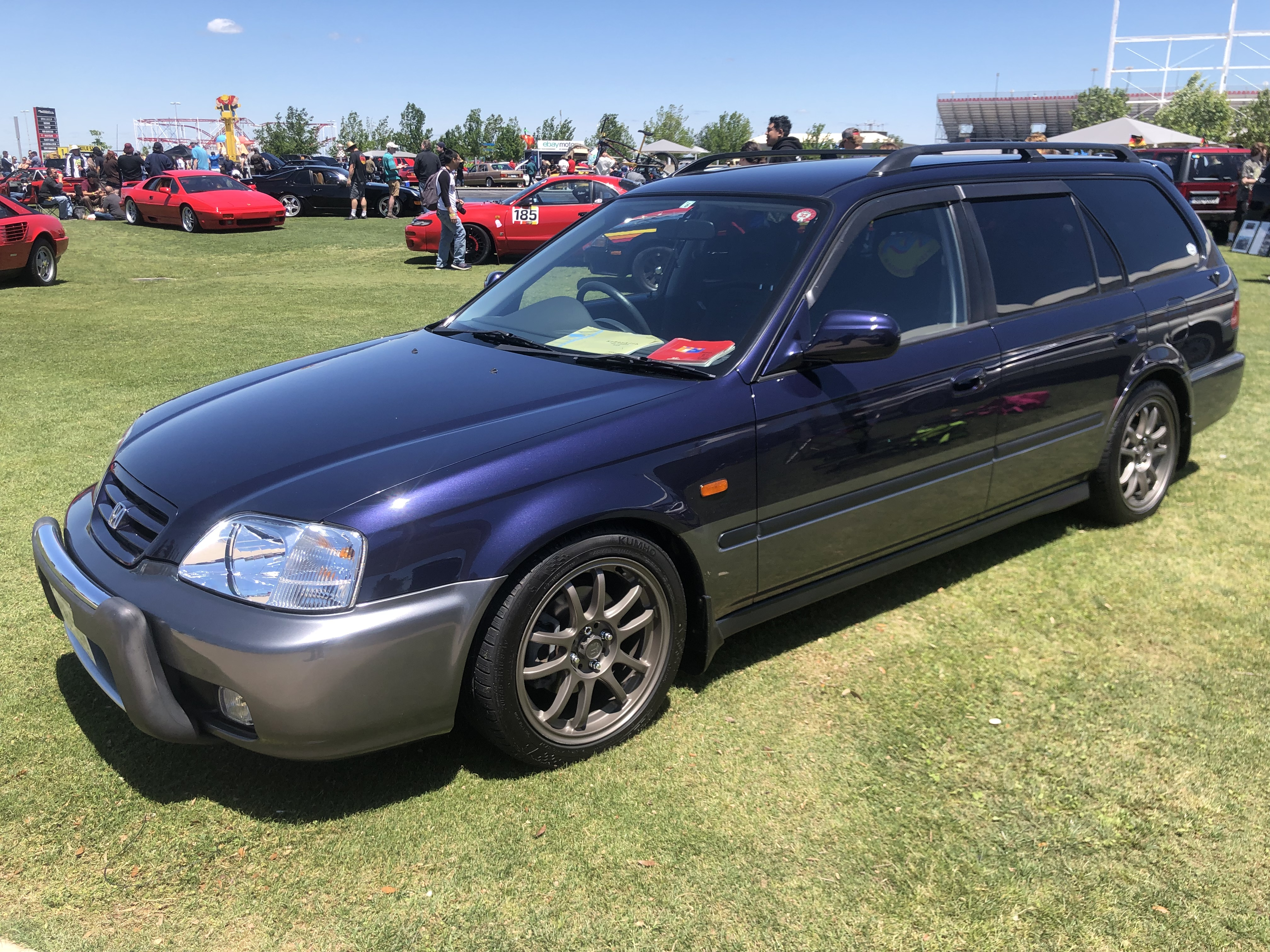
1996–1999 Honda Orthia P GX-S

A facelift in June 1999 saw only the 2.0 L B20B engine option available and a new method of designating the trim levels. The facelift model has new front and rear bumpers, new patterned seat fabric, new taillights, and a double din radio bezel as standard. The new trim levels were as follows:

- B (Available in a front wheel drive configuration with a manual transmission and the 2.0L DOHC B20B engine)
- M (Available in a front-wheel drive configuration with an automatic transmission and the 2.0L DOHC B20B engine). This model features color matched side molding and optional satellite navigation.
- M4 (Available in a four-wheel drive configuration with an automatic transmission and the 2.0L DOHC B20B engine).
- L4 (Available in a four-wheel drive configuration with an automatic transmission and the 2.0L DOHC B20B engine). This model features a two tone paint scheme with color matched side molding, alloy wheels, and wood grain patterned interior trim
- S (Available in a front-wheel drive configuration with an automatic transmission and the 2.0L DOHC B20B engine). This model features a special lip kit, carbon fiber patterned interior trim, special pattern seats, a 3 spoke leather trimmed steering wheel, color matched fog light protectors, and was available in either front-wheel drive and four-wheel drive

Production of Orthia stopped in January 2002 while its sibling, the Partner, continued until March 2006. The Orthia was replaced by the Airwave station wagon and Stream minivan.

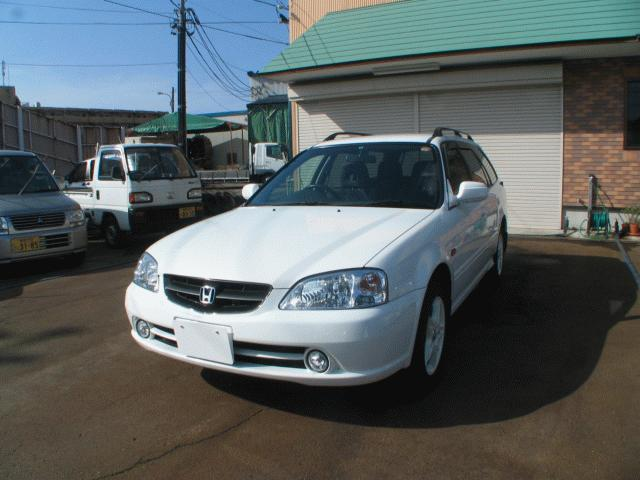
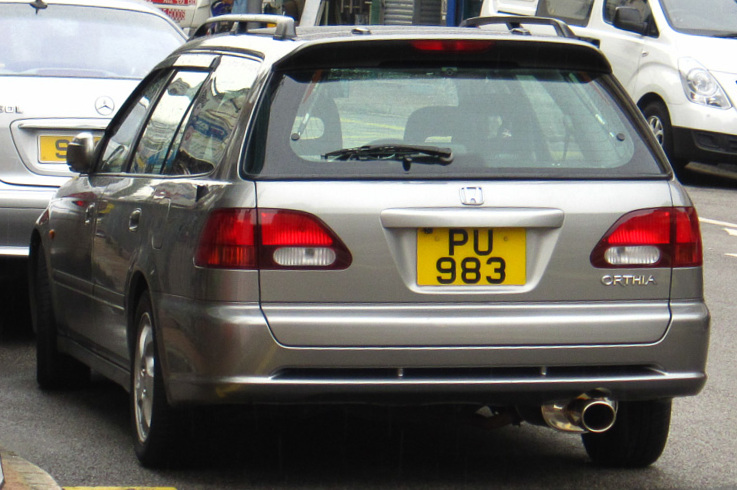
1999 facelift model

The Honda Orthia finds itself a increasingly popular platform for modification due to its low price and legality for import to the United States. Being based on the 6th generation Civic platform, this allows many options for engine swaps, suspension modifications, and body modifications. Popular engine swaps include the VTEC Honda B engines and Honda K engines. With a minor amount of body work, the front end of a 1996-2000 Civic can be installed, allowing for the creation of a "Civic Wagon" or "Civic Aerodeck" (not to be confused with the European market Civic MB/MC).

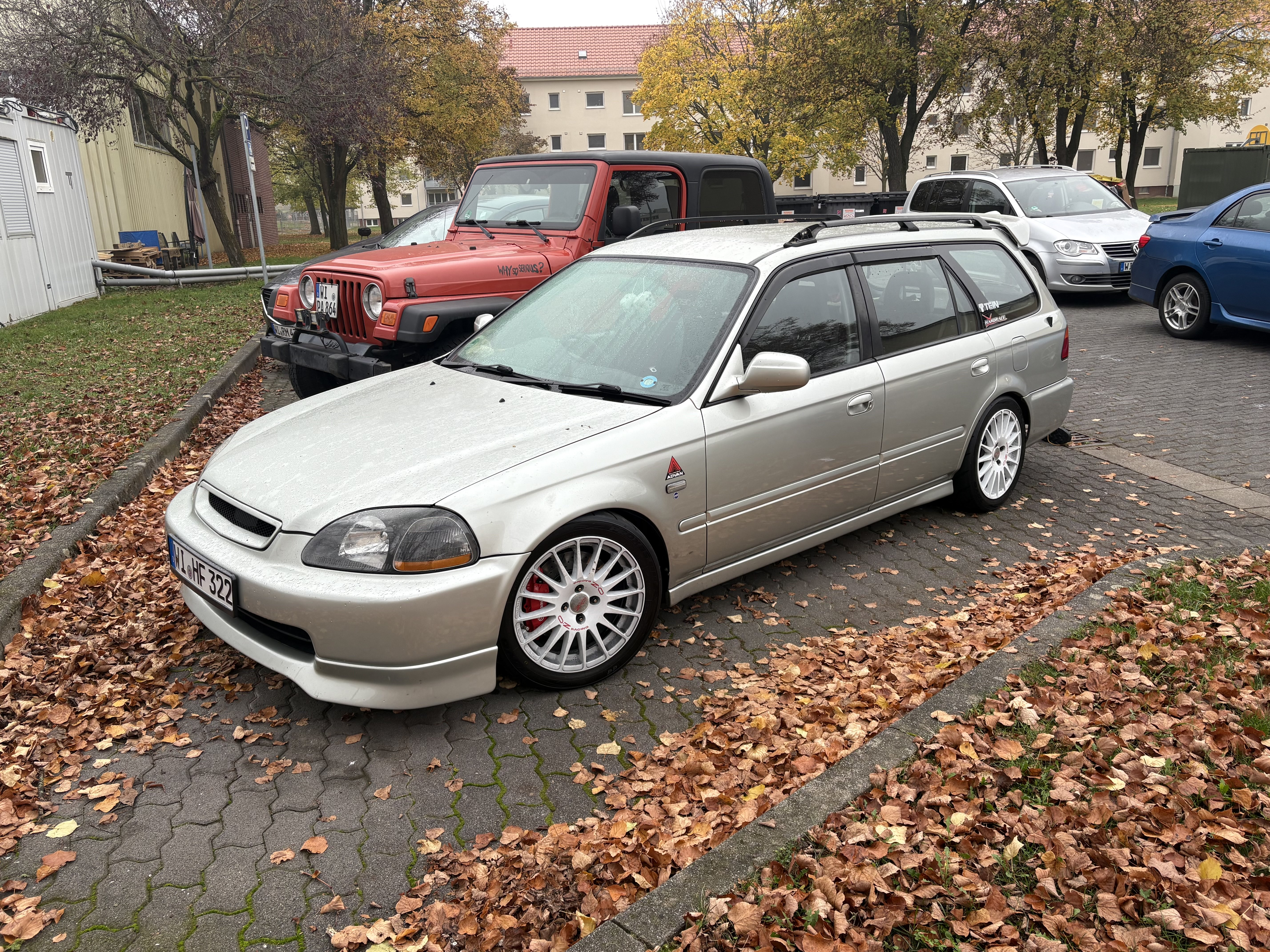
An example of a modified Honda Orthia with a 1996-1998 Honda Civic Type R front end swap

== Honda Partner (EY6/EY7/EY8/EY9; 1996–2006) ==
A commercial van version of the Orthia, called Honda Partner (ホンダ・パートナー, Honda Pātonā) was introduced on March 15, 1996. It is powered with either the 1,343 cc D13, the 1,493 cc D15, or the 1,590 cc D16 inline-four engines. The 1.6 L engine-powered Partner was Honda's first Low Emission Vehicle. Anti-lock braking system was installed in January 1998 and the vehicle was brought into year 2000 emissions compliance along with a driver-side airbag as standard equipment.

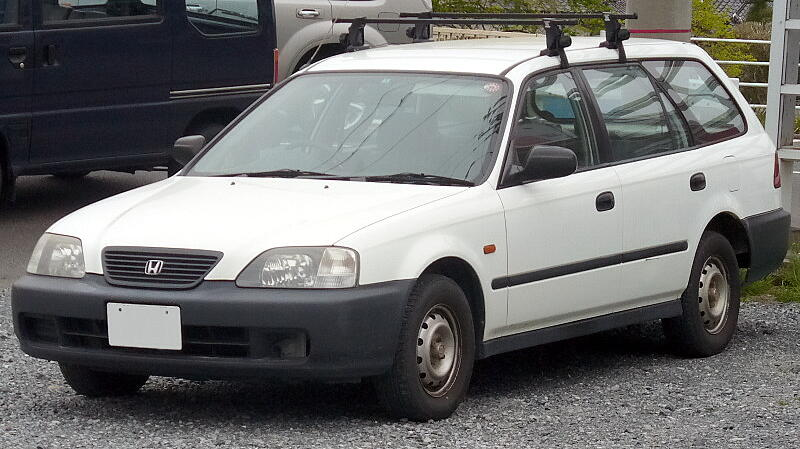
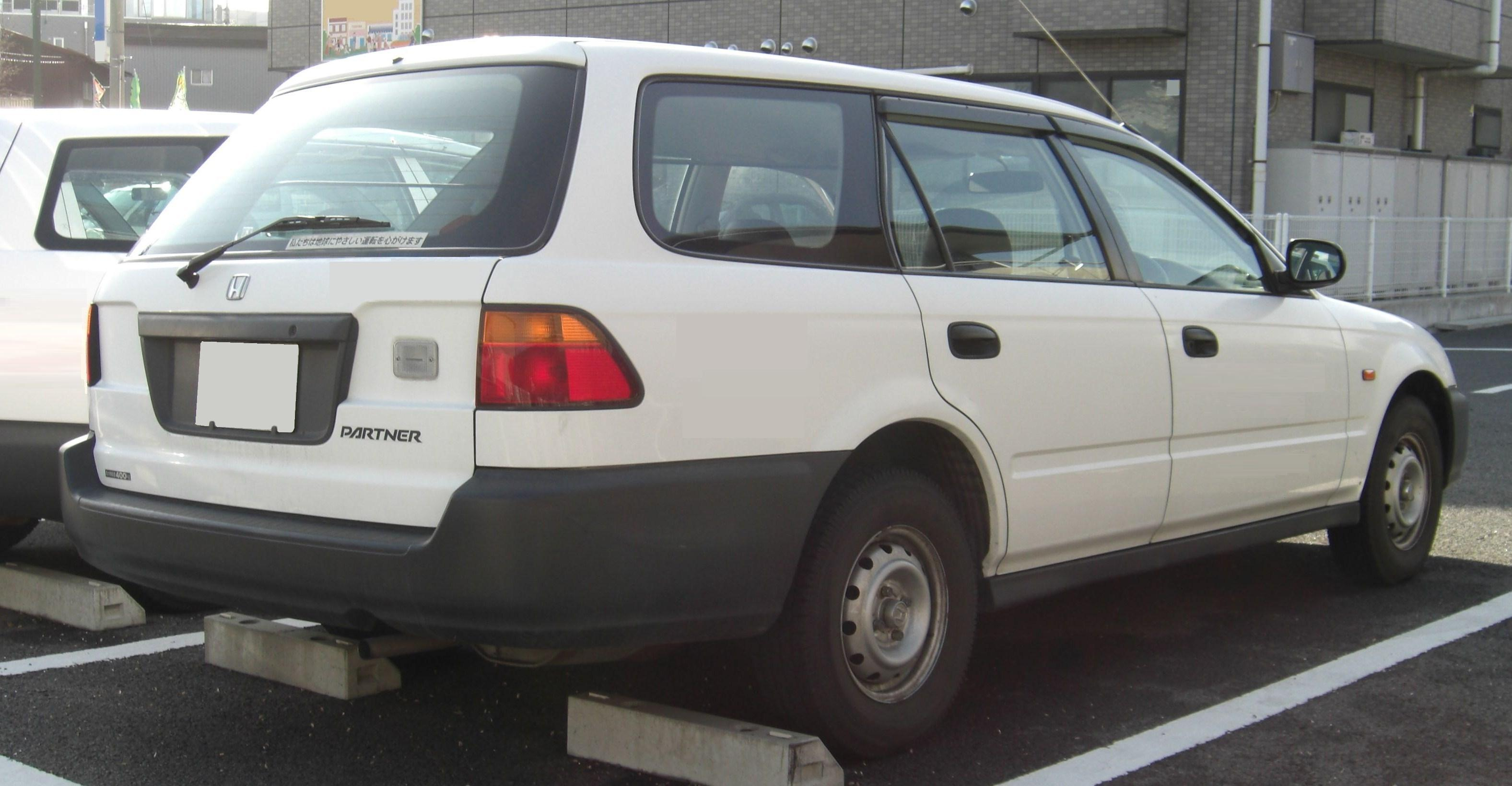
1996–2006 Honda Partner

== See also ==
- List of Honda vehicles
