= Honda Airwave =

Subcompact station wagon produced by Honda (2005-2010)

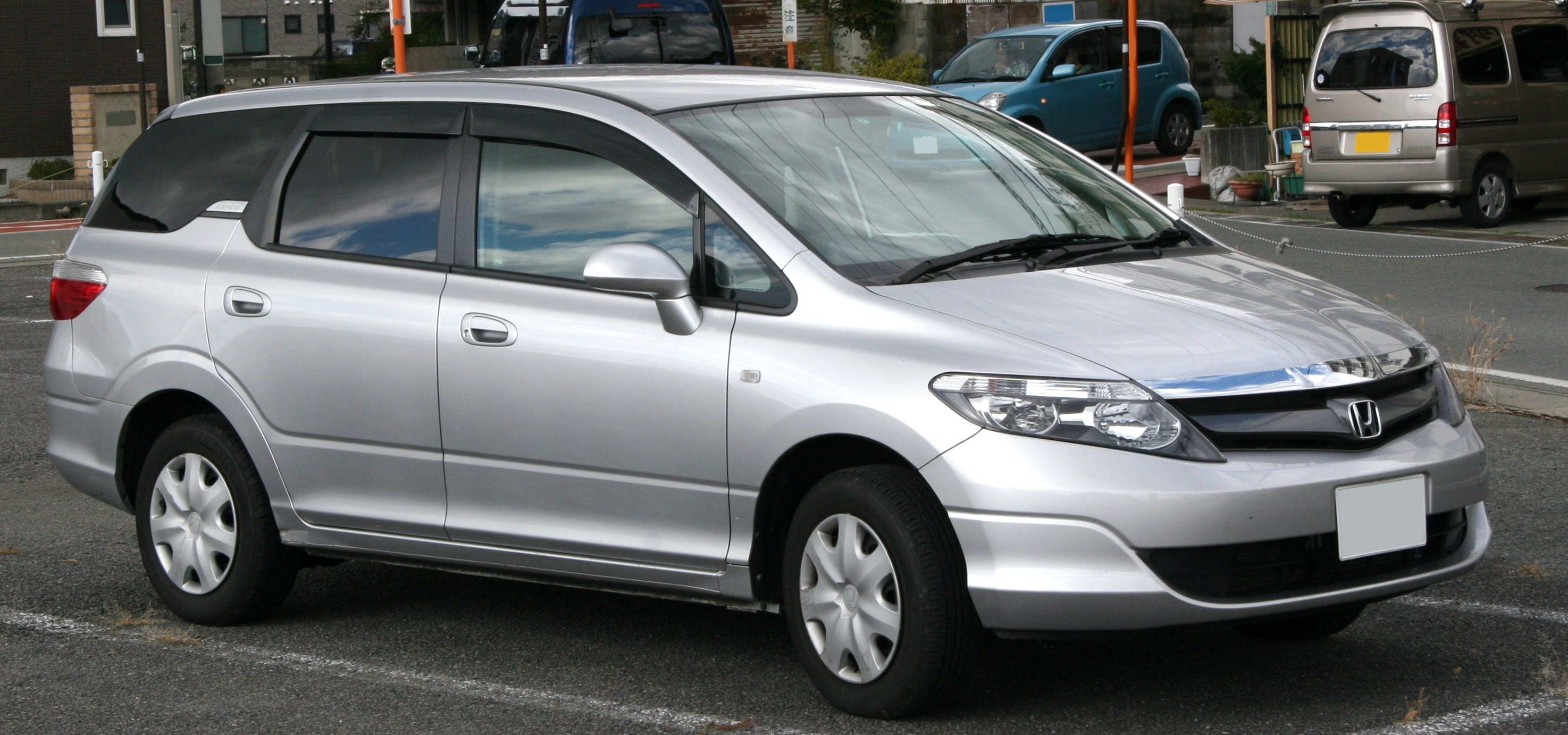

Overview
- Manufacturer: Honda
- Model code: GJ1/GJ2
- Also called: Honda Partner
- Production: April 2005 – August 2010 (Airwave); March 2006 – September 2010 (Partner)
- Assembly: Japan: Suzuka, Mie (HONDA, Suzuka Factory)

Body and chassis
- Class: Subcompact car
- Body style: 5-door station wagon
- Layout: Front-engine, front-wheel-drive; Front-engine, four-wheel-drive
- Platform: Honda Global Small Car
- Related: Honda Fit (first generation); Honda Fit Aria

Powertrain
- Engine: 1.5 L L15A2 i-DSI I4 (petrol); 1.5 L L15A1 VTEC I4 (petrol)
- Transmission: CVT

Dimensions
- Wheelbase: 2,550 mm (100.4 in)
- Length: 4,350 mm (171.3 in)
- Width: 1,695 mm (66.7 in)
- Height: 1,515–1,530 mm (59.6–60.2 in)
- Kerb weight: 1,160 kg (2,557 lb) (Airwave); 1,150–1,220 kg (2,535–2,690 lb) (Partner)

Chronology
- Predecessor: Honda Orthia
- Successor: Honda Fit Shuttle

The Honda Airwave is a subcompact car produced by the Japanese automaker Honda from 2005 until 2010. It is a five-door station wagon version of the first-generation City/Fit Aria and Fit/Jazz, which was a sedan and a hatchback respectively. The Airwave was built on the Global Small Car platform; however, unlike the City and Fit, the Airwave was unique to the Japanese market. Honda announced the debut of the Airwave on April 7, 2005.

Production ended in August 2010. Its successor, the Honda Fit Shuttle, went on sale in June 2011.

== Models ==
The Airwave was sold in two trim lines, the basic "G" model, and the well-equipped "L" model. Each of the trim lines had an optional panoramic-glass sunroof that covered a large part of the roof. Each version of the car was available in either front-wheel drive or four-wheel drive.

It was also sold as the Honda Partner (series GJ3/GJ4) panel van between March 10, 2006 and August 2010 in Japan. Essentially a decontented version of the Airwave, the Partner utilized a different 1.5 L engine, the L15A i-DSI (unlike the VTEC engine in the Airwave), mated to a five-speed automatic transmission identical to that found in the North American market Fit.

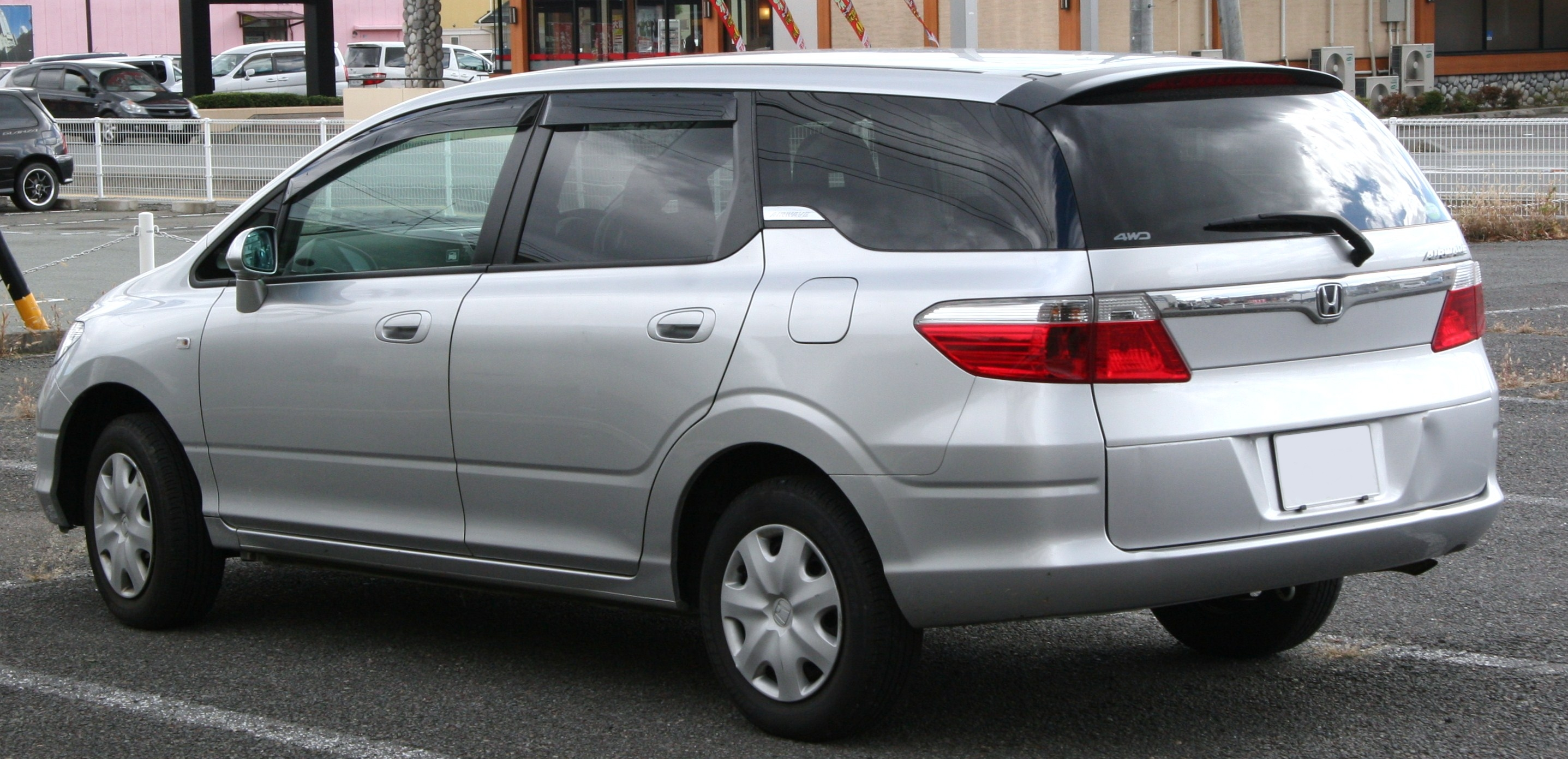
Pre-facelift

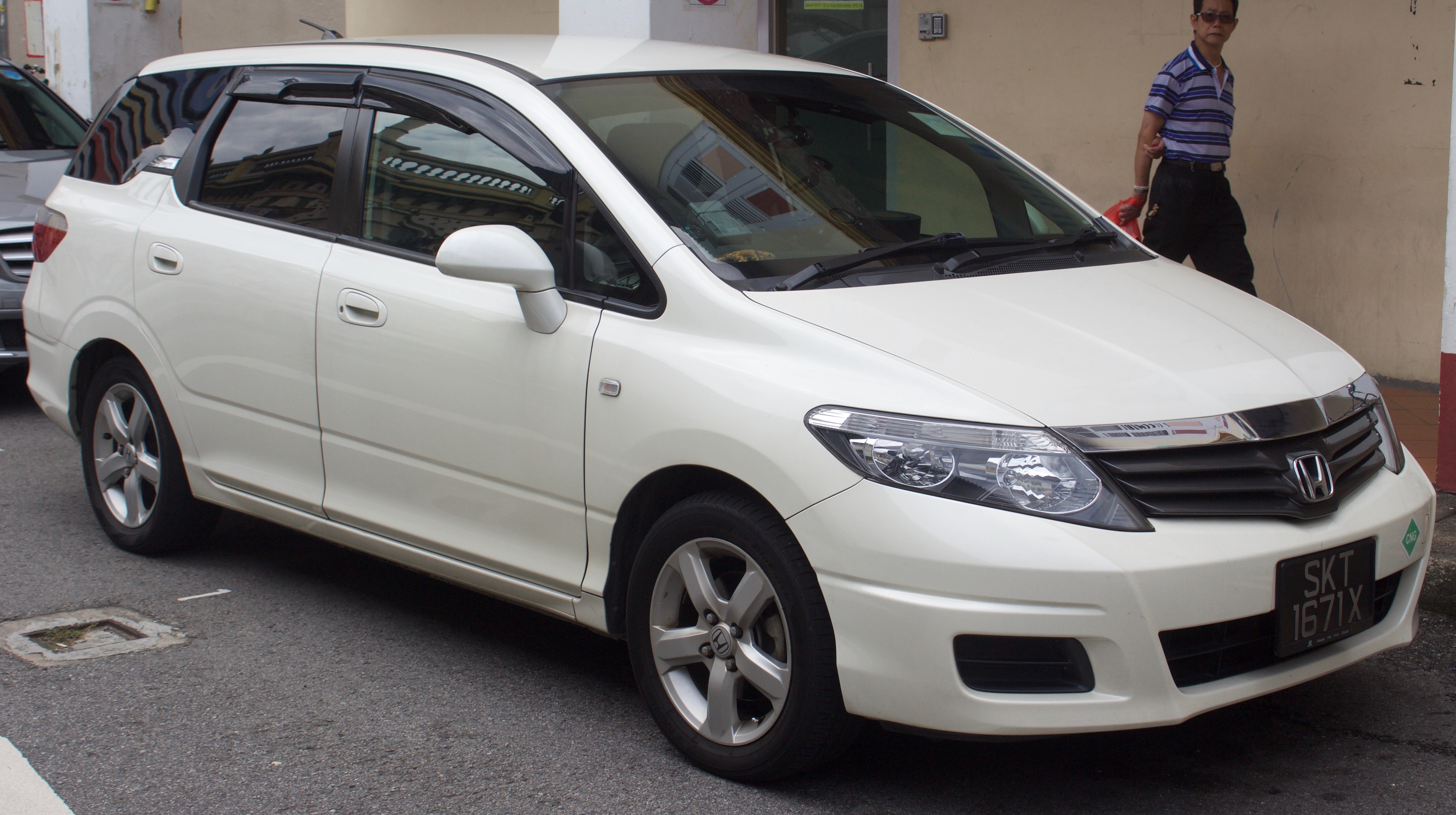
Post-facelift

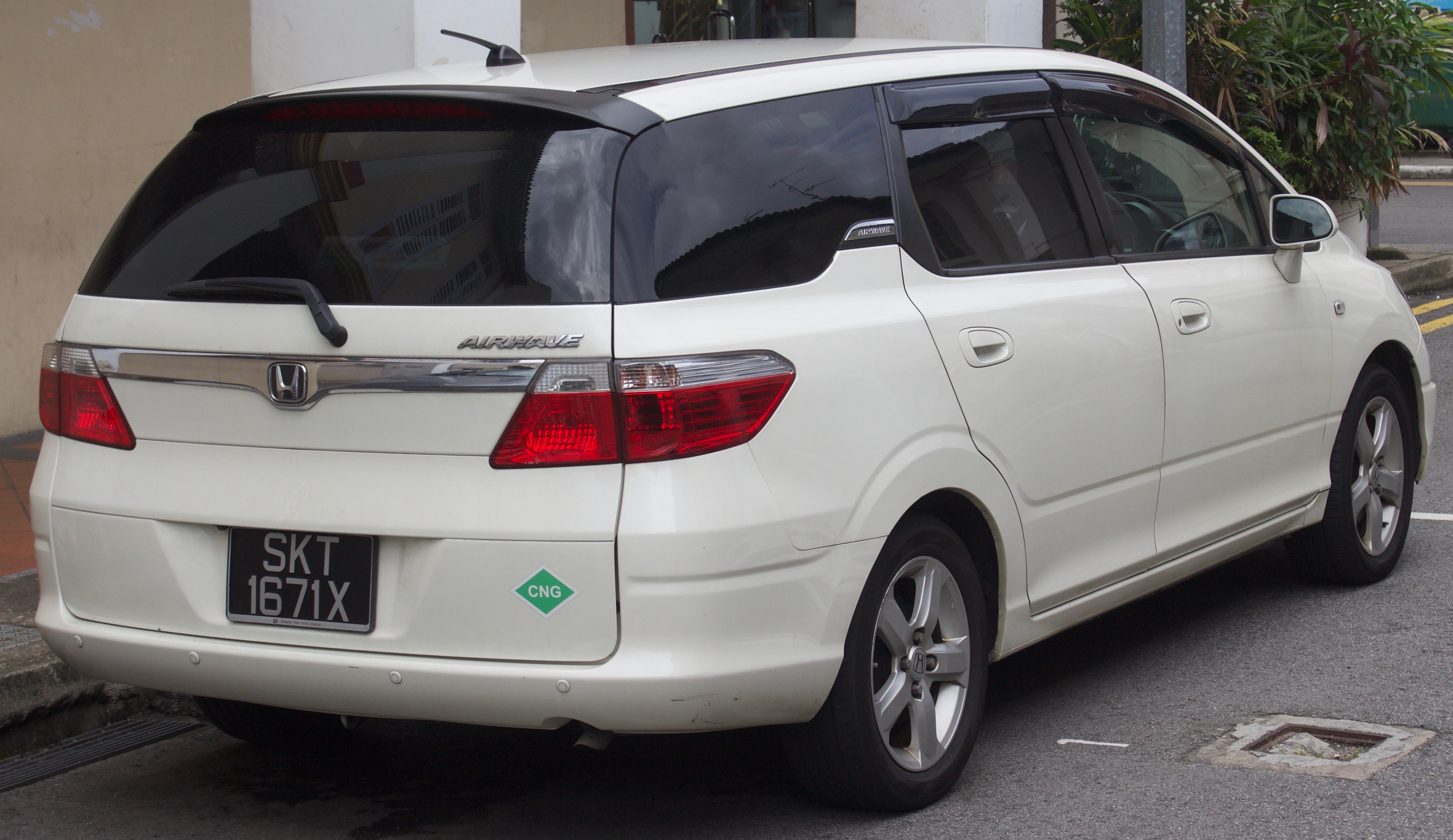
Post-facelift

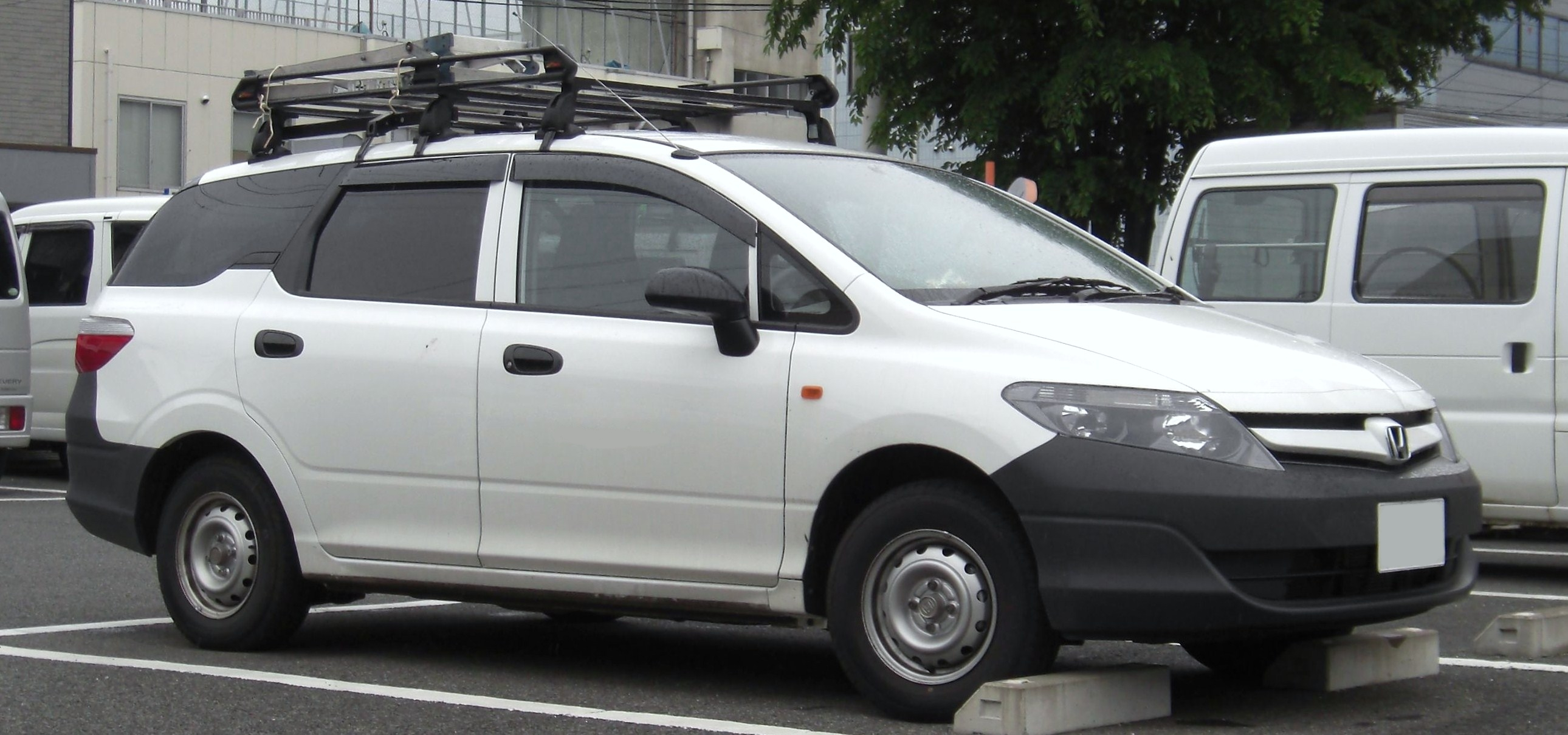
Honda Partner (Japan)

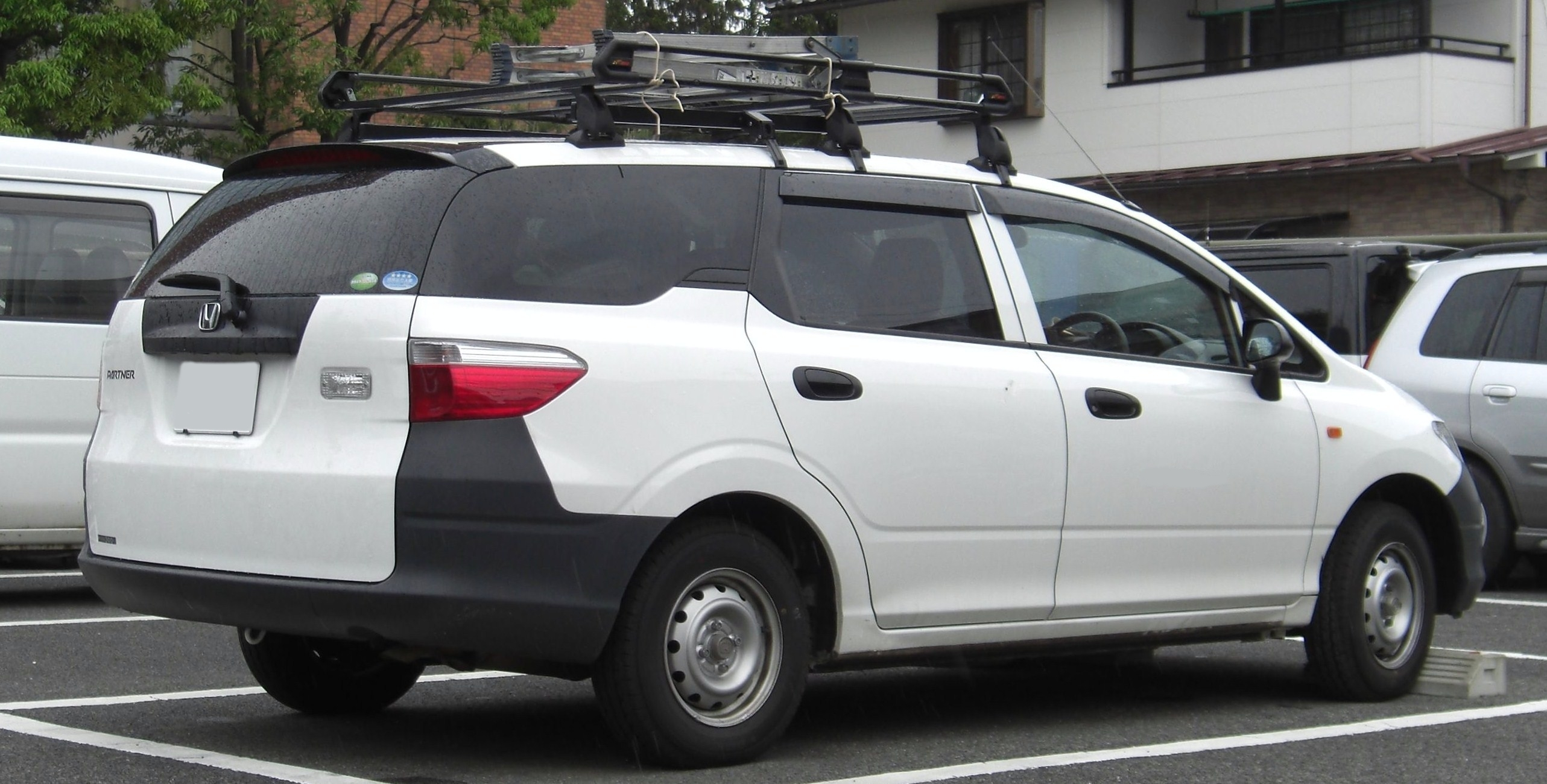
Honda Partner (Japan)

== Drivetrain ==
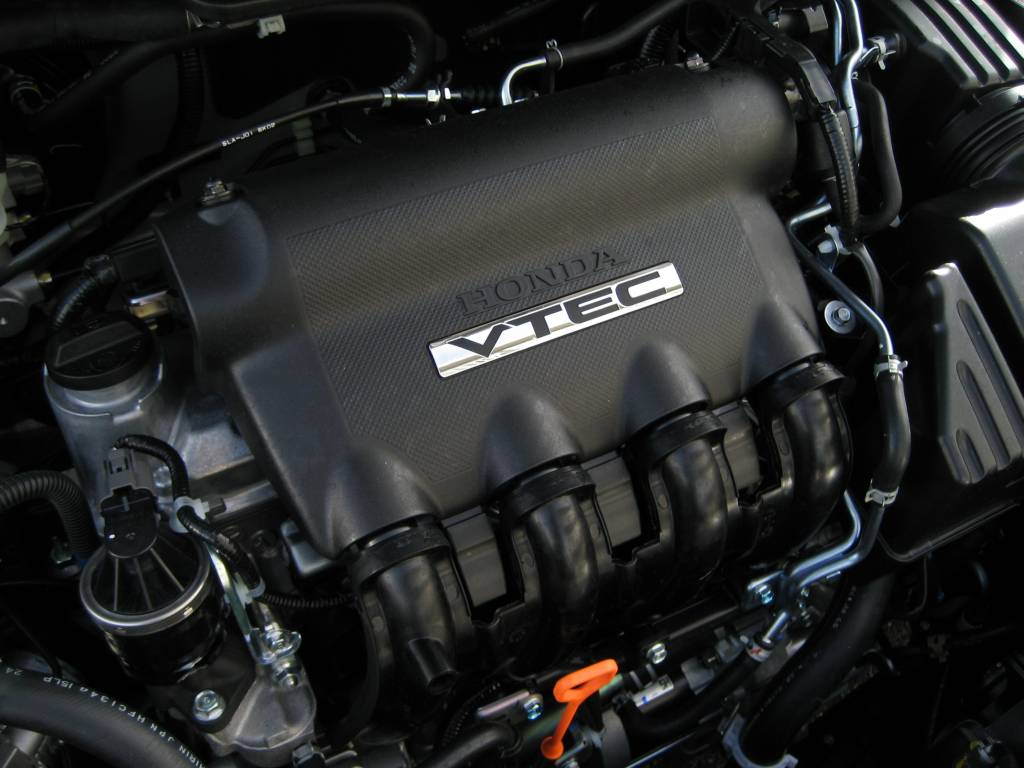
L15A (1.5L SOHC VTEC) engine.

The Airwave was powered by the largest version of Honda's L-series engine family, the 1,496 cc 1.5 L VTEC L15A gasoline engine. The engine produced a maximum output of 81 kW (109 hp) at 5,800 rpm and a maximum torque of 143 Nm (105 lb·ft) of torque at 4,800 rpm.

Two forms of a continuously variable transmission (CVT) were available on the Airwave. The "G" trim line had a standard CVT, while the "L" sported a CVT with seven-speed mode which allowed the driver to choose between the smooth, shiftless acceleration of a standard CVT, or the added option of shifting through seven computer-controlled "gears".

== Interior ==
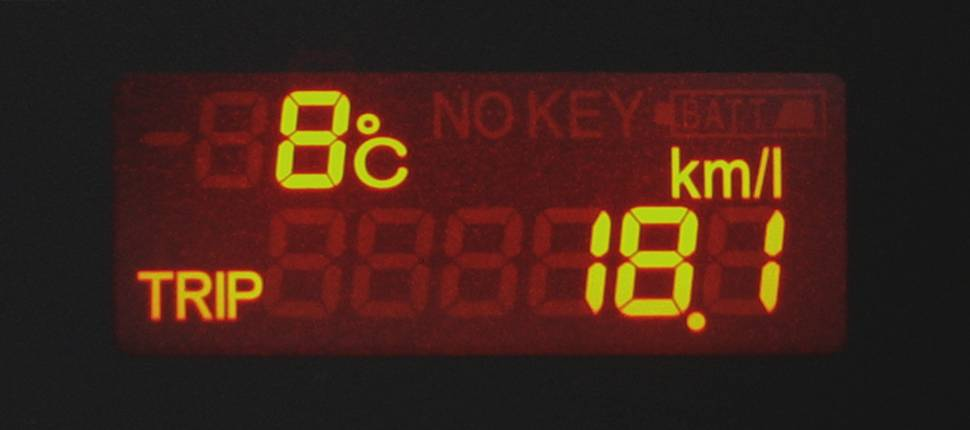
Fuel economy monitor in a 2006 Airwave

The interior versatility of the Airwave was similar to its smaller sibling, the Fit. By moving the fuel tank underneath the front row of seats, space was freed up in the rear for a flexible seating system. Like the Fit, the Airwave had five different seating modes.

Ultra Seat: The fuel tank and rear suspension layout also allows a multiple-mode seating system, marketed by Honda as Ultra Seat (Asia) and Magic Seat (North America, Oceania), with four seating modes — and a fifth in certain markets:

- Normal: seats were in their normal position with seating for five.
- Utility: Either section (or both) of the 60:40 split rear seat sank down into the rear foot well as the rear seat back was lowered forward. This offered a low, perfectly flat surface that increased the cargo area substantially.
- Long: The rear seat folded down similar to utility mode, but the front passenger seat folded backward, leaving an area that could hold items as long as 2.7 meters (8.9 ft).
- Tall: Either section (or both) of the rear seat cushion folded up against the rear seat back, allowing for an area of 1.25 meters (4.1 ft) in height.
- Refresh: With the headrest of the front seats removed, the front seat backs could be folded down to form a lounge-style sitting area.

== Sales ==
The Airwave started its sales from Apr 7th, 2005.

Sales Figures in the Japanese domestic market:

Year	Sales in Japan
2005	43,846
2006	32,253
2007	21,175
2008	15,648
2009	9,052

All of them were sold in the Japanese market; however, some of them were exported as parallel imports to some countries (e.g., Hong Kong, Macau, Singapore, Thailand, Pakistan, and New Zealand).
