= Honda Partner =

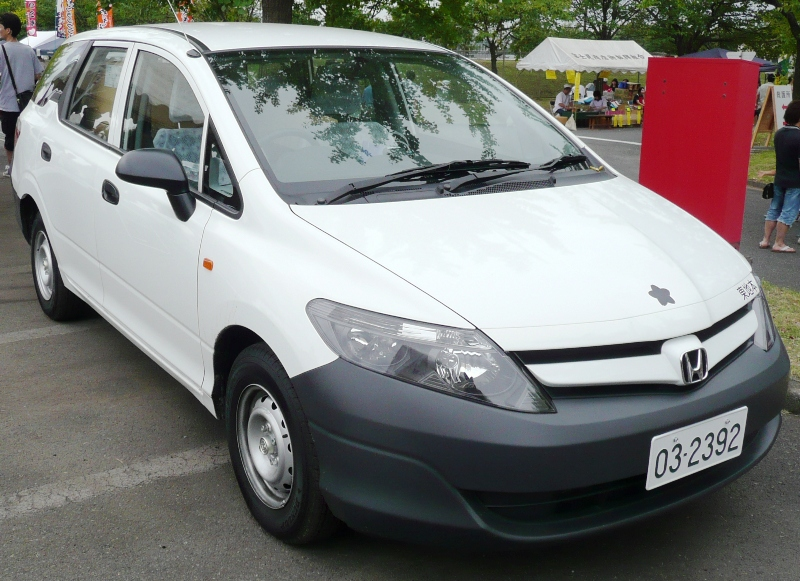

Overview
- Manufacturer: Honda
- Also called: Honda Orthia (1996–2006); Honda Airwave (2006–2010)
- Production: March 1996 – September 2010

Body and chassis
- Class: Light commercial vehicle
- Body style: 5-door station wagon
- Layout: Front-engine, front-wheel-drive; Front-engine, four-wheel-drive

Chronology
- Predecessor: Honda Pro

The Honda Partner (Japanese: ホンダ・パートナー, Honda Pātonā) is a series of commercial vans produced by Honda between 1996 and 2010. It was only sold in the Japanese market. The first-generation Partner, which was produced from March 1996 until March 2006, was based on the Orthia station wagon, while the second generation, which was produced from March 2006 until September 2010, was based on the Airwave station wagon.

== Gallery ==
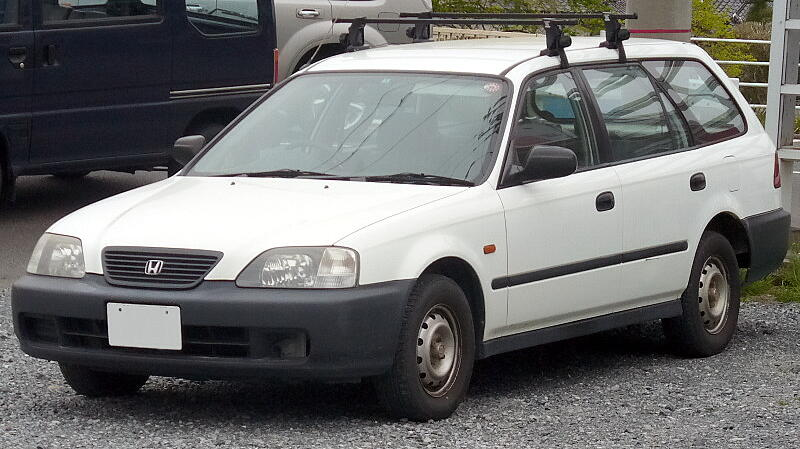
First generation (EY6/7/8/9; 1996–2006)

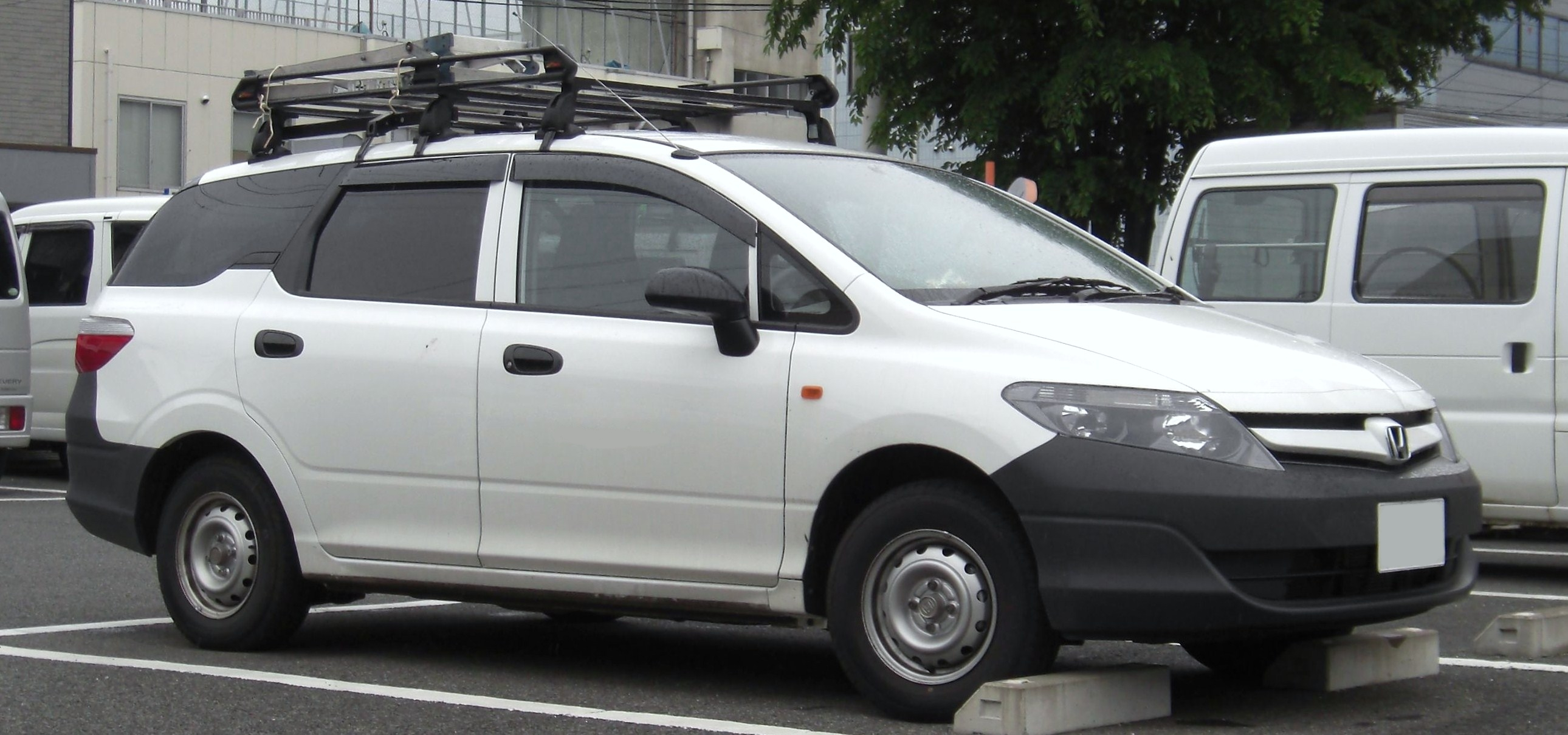
Second generation (GJ3/4; 2006–2010)
