= Honda Fit Shuttle =

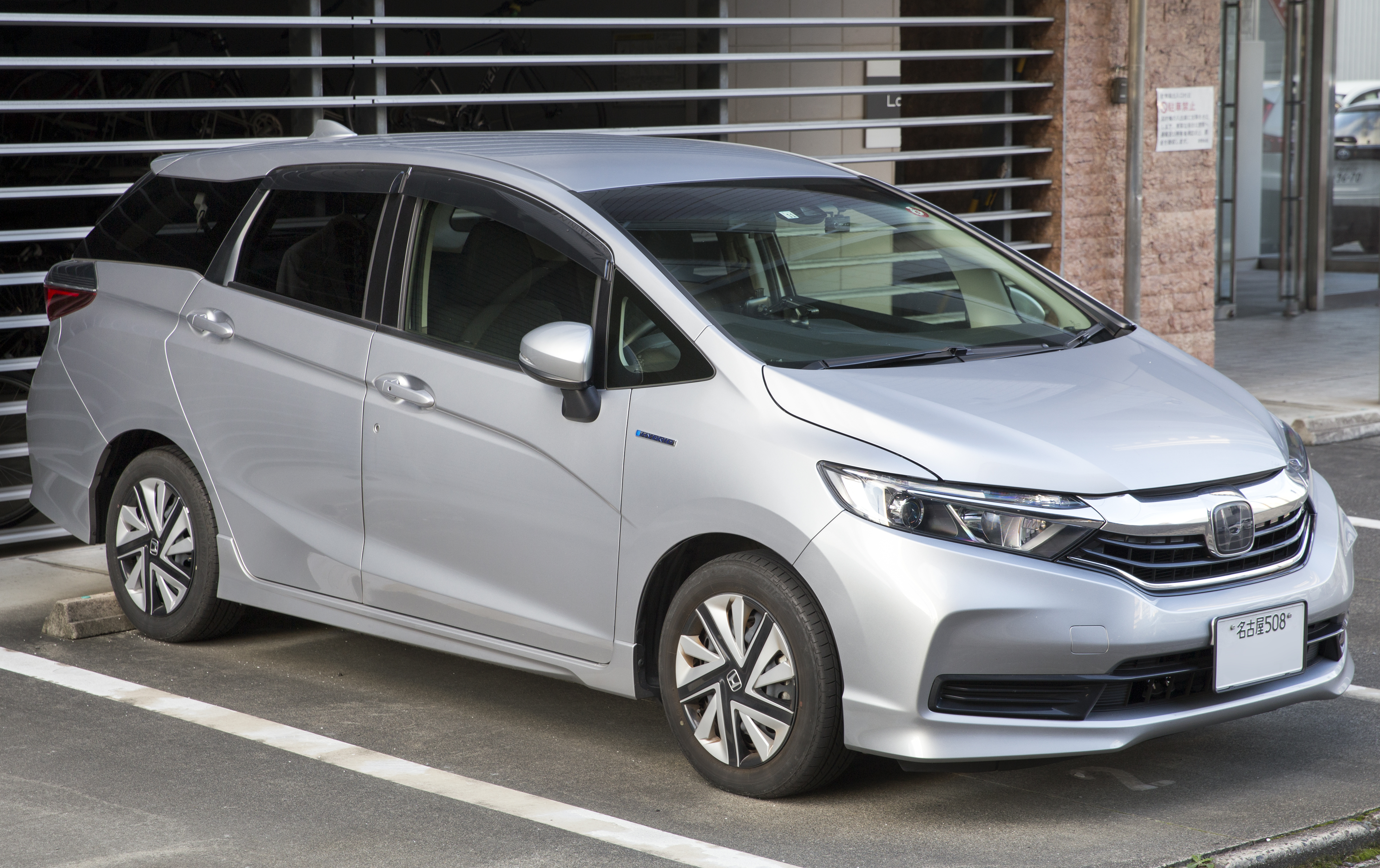
- 2020 Honda Shuttle Hybrid (GP7, Japan)

Overview
- Manufacturer: Honda
- Also called: Honda Shuttle (second generation; 2015–2022)
- Production: May 2011 – August 2022

Body and chassis
- Class: Subcompact car (B)
- Body style: 5-door station wagon
- Layout: Front-engine, front-wheel-drive or four-wheel-drive (Japan)
- Platform: Honda Global Small Car

Chronology
- Predecessor: Honda Airwave
- Successor: Honda Freed

The Honda Fit Shuttle is a subcompact station wagon which was produced by Honda from May 2011 until August 2022 over two generations. The Fit Shuttle is a Japanese domestic market five-door station wagon derived from the Fit platform. The first generation served as the successor of the Airwave, which was derived from the first-generation Fit. The second generation entered production in April 2015. The Fit Shuttle has a front-mounted engine equipped with either front-wheel drive or four-wheel drive versions of petrol engined and petrol-electric hybrid variants.

== First generation (GG7/8/GP2; 2011–2015) ==
First generation
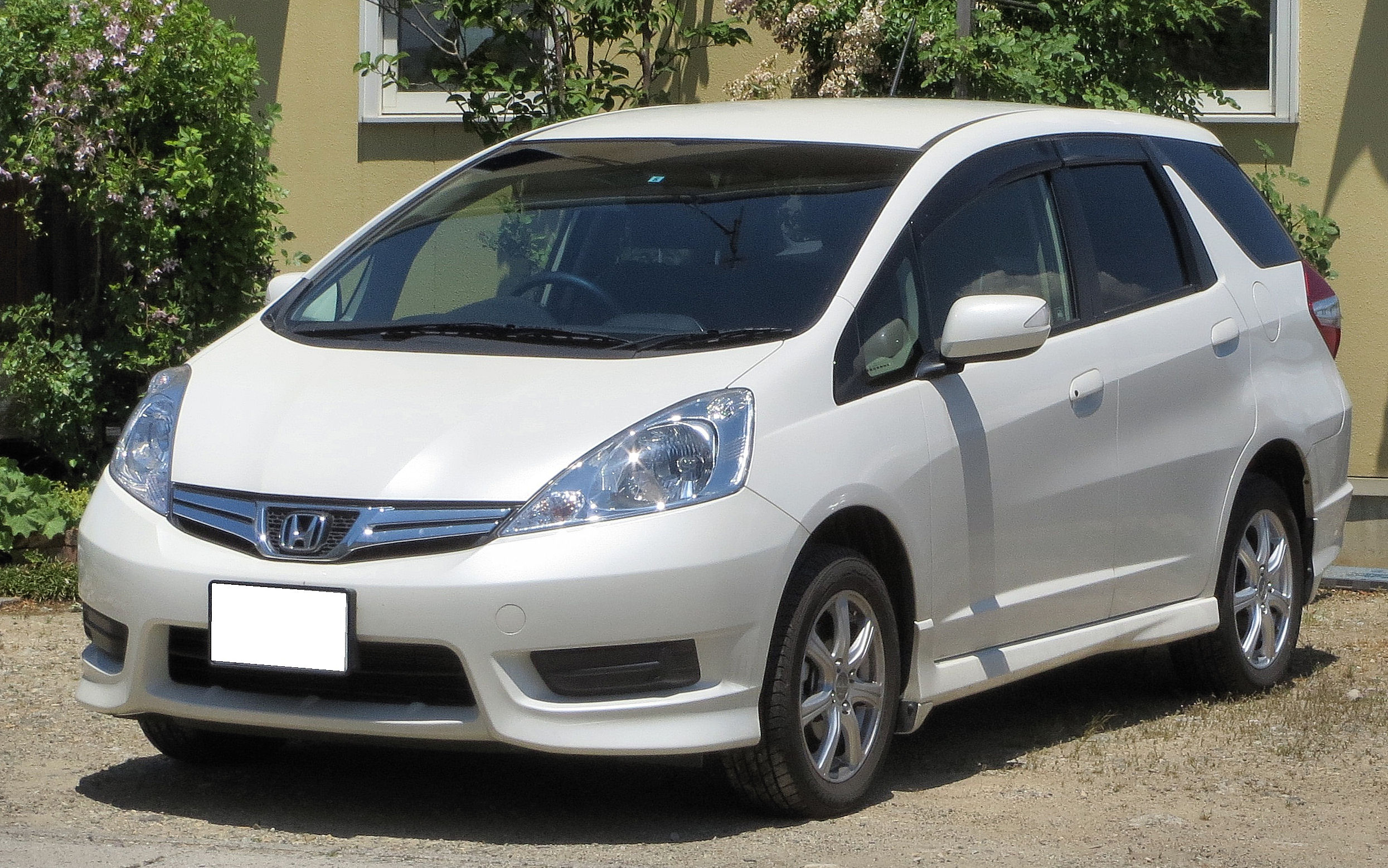
- Honda Fit Shuttle (pre-facelift)

Overview
- Model code: GG7; GG8; GP2
- Production: 2011–2015
- Assembly: Japan: Yorii, Saitama

Body and chassis
- Related: Honda Fit; Honda City; Honda Freed

Powertrain
- Engine: Petrol: 1.5 L L15A I4; Hybrid: 1.3 L LDA-MF6 (Honda IMA system) I4
- Transmission: 5-speed automatic (AWD); CVT (FWD & Hybrid)

Dimensions
- Wheelbase: 2,530 mm (99.6 in)
- Length: 4,410 mm (173.6 in) (pre-facelift); 4,385 mm (172.6 in) (facelift)
- Width: 1,695 mm (66.7 in)
- Height: 1,540 mm (60.6 in) (FWD); 1,565 mm (61.6 in) (AWD)
- Curb weight: 1,140–1,150 kg (2,513–2,535 lb) (FWD); 1,210–1,230 kg (2,668–2,712 lb) (AWD); 1,190–1,210 kg (2,624–2,668 lb) (Hybrid)

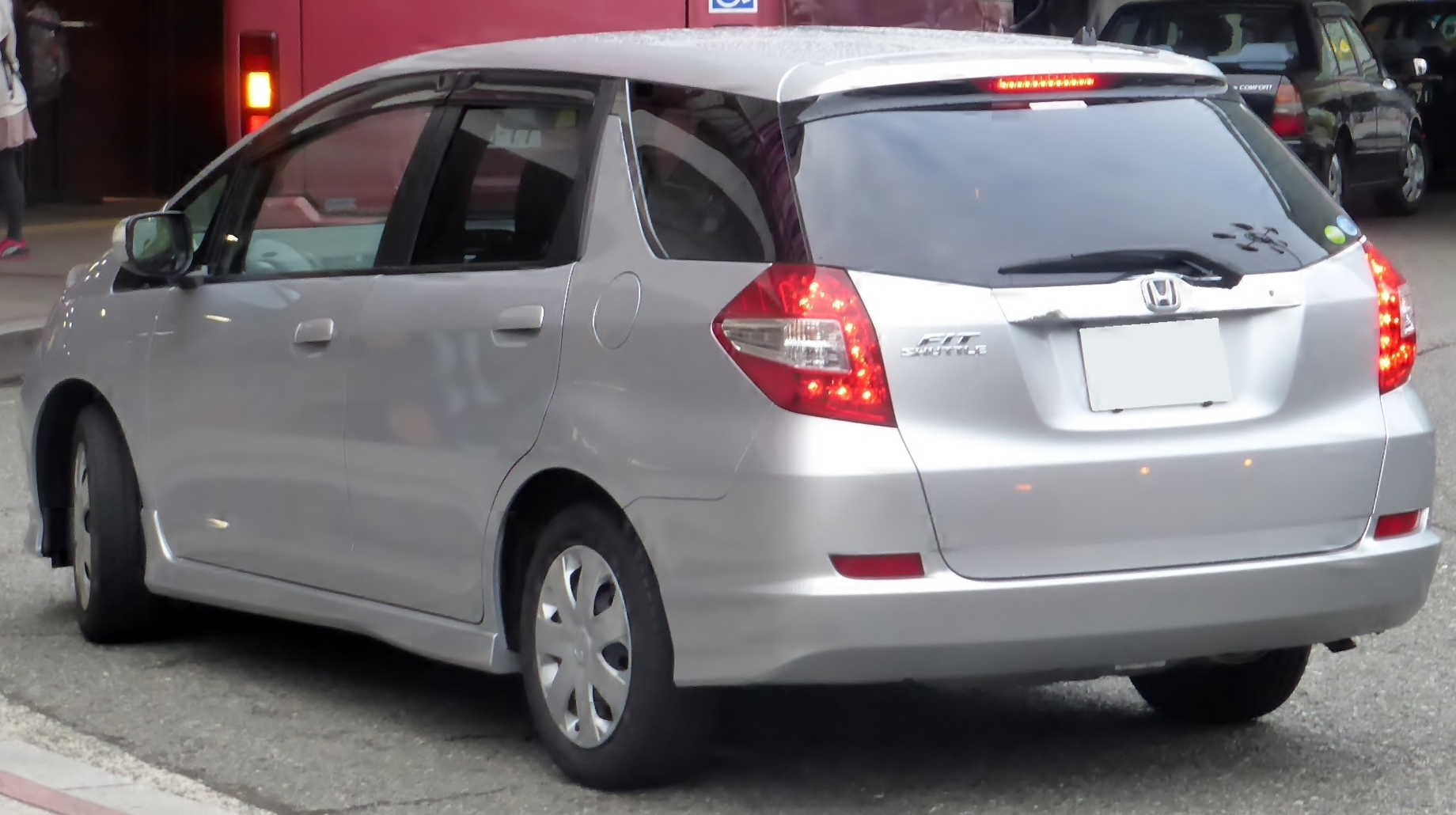
Honda Fit Shuttle (pre-facelift)

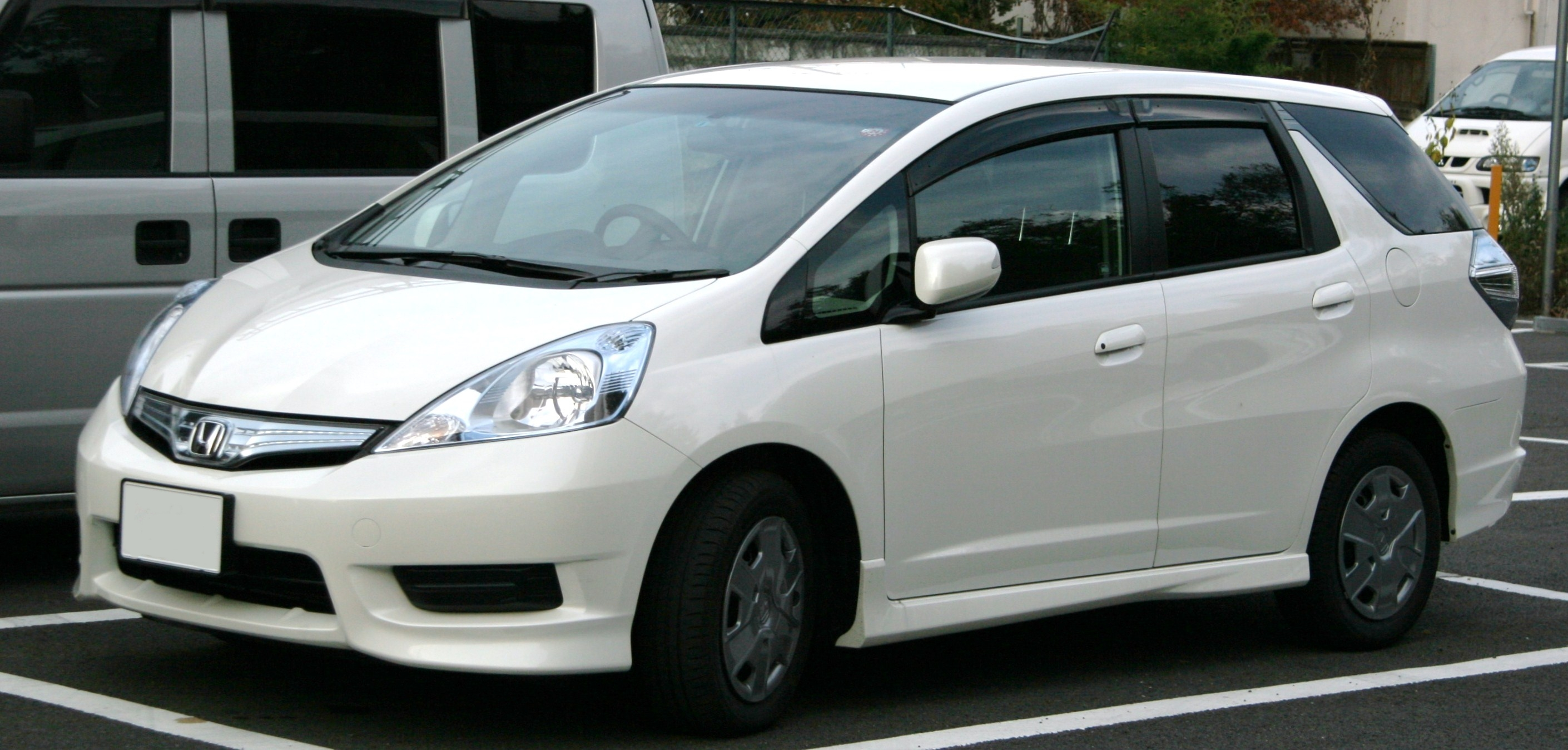

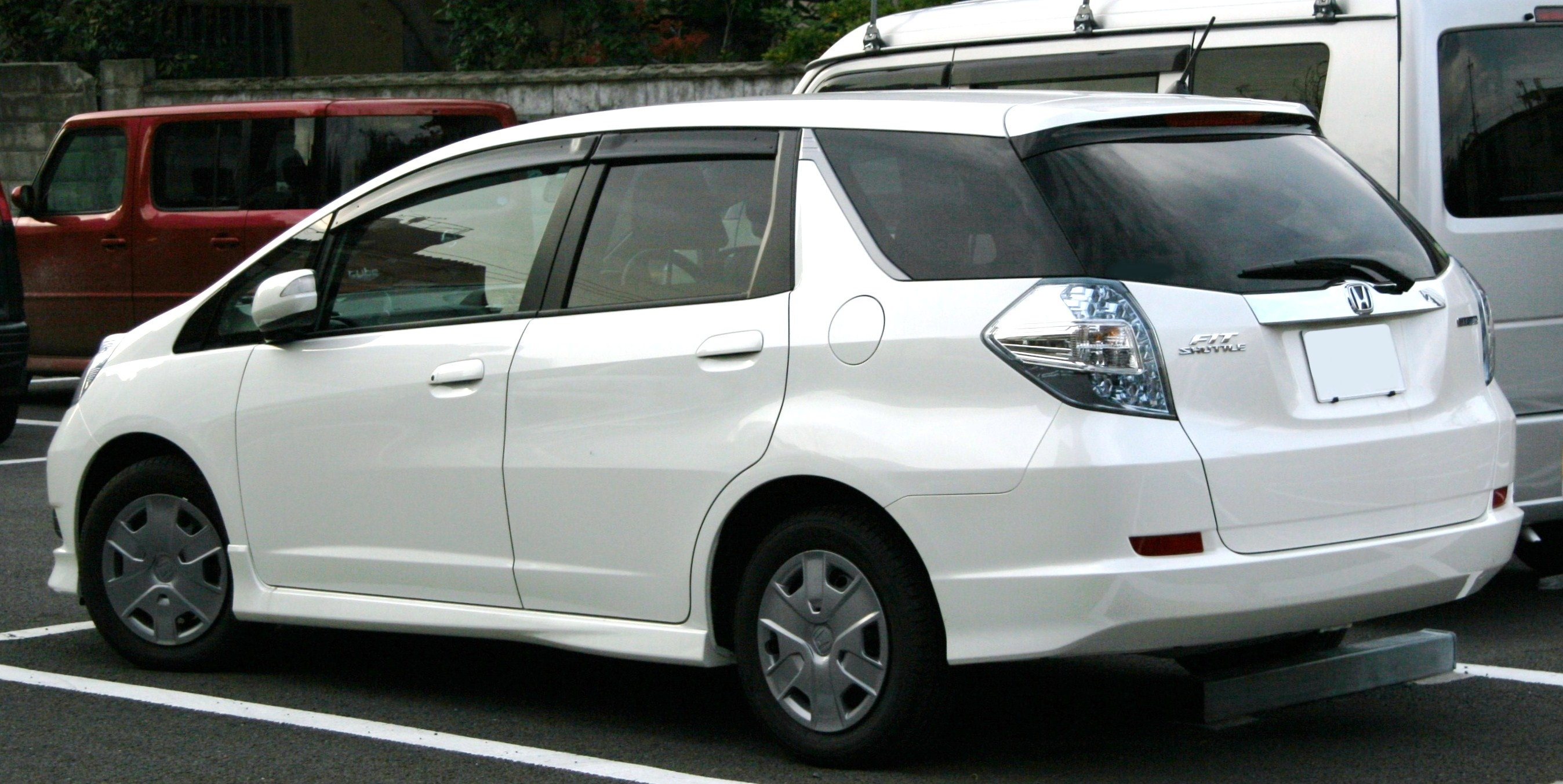
Honda Fit Shuttle Hybrid (pre-facelift)

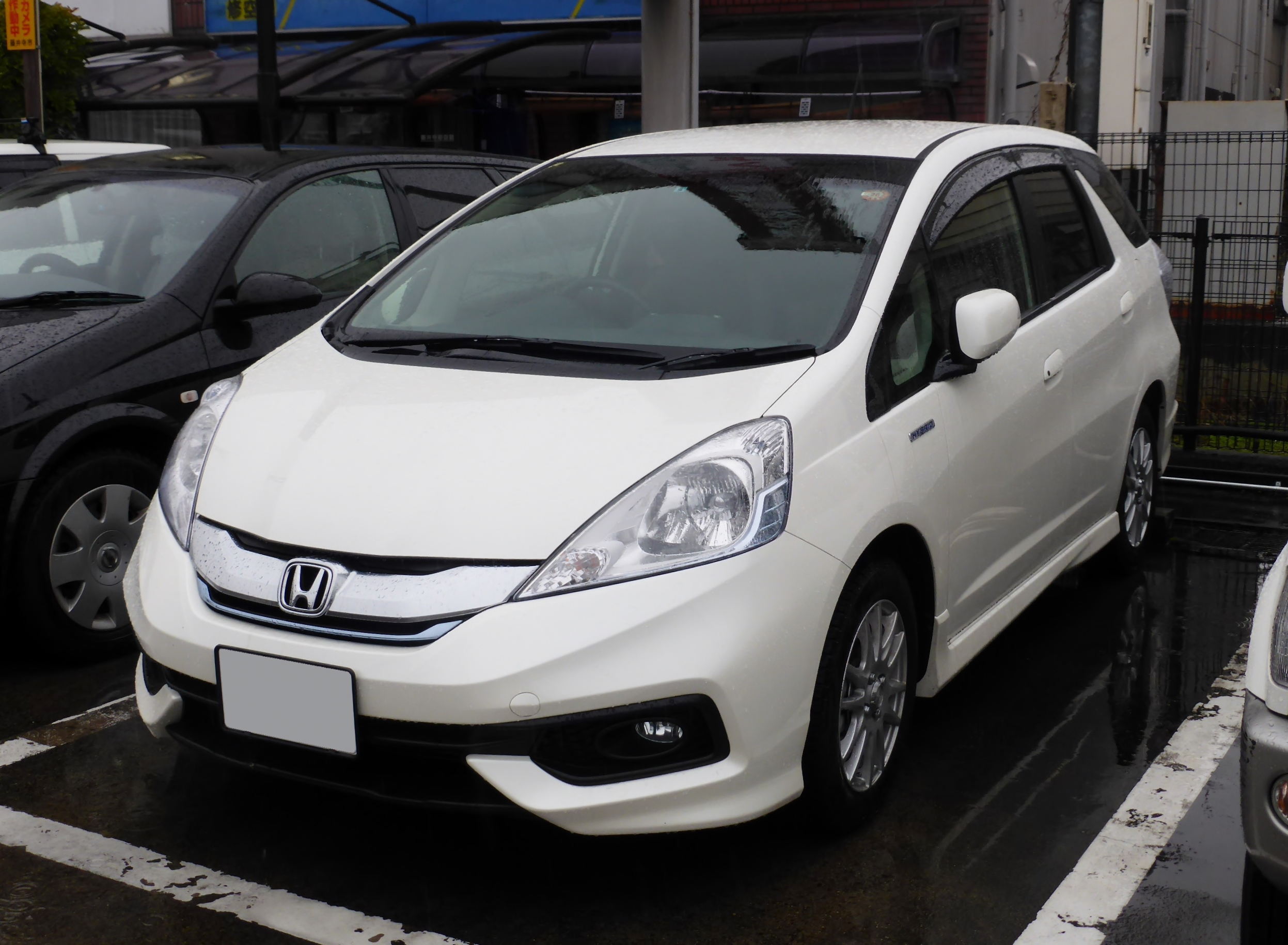

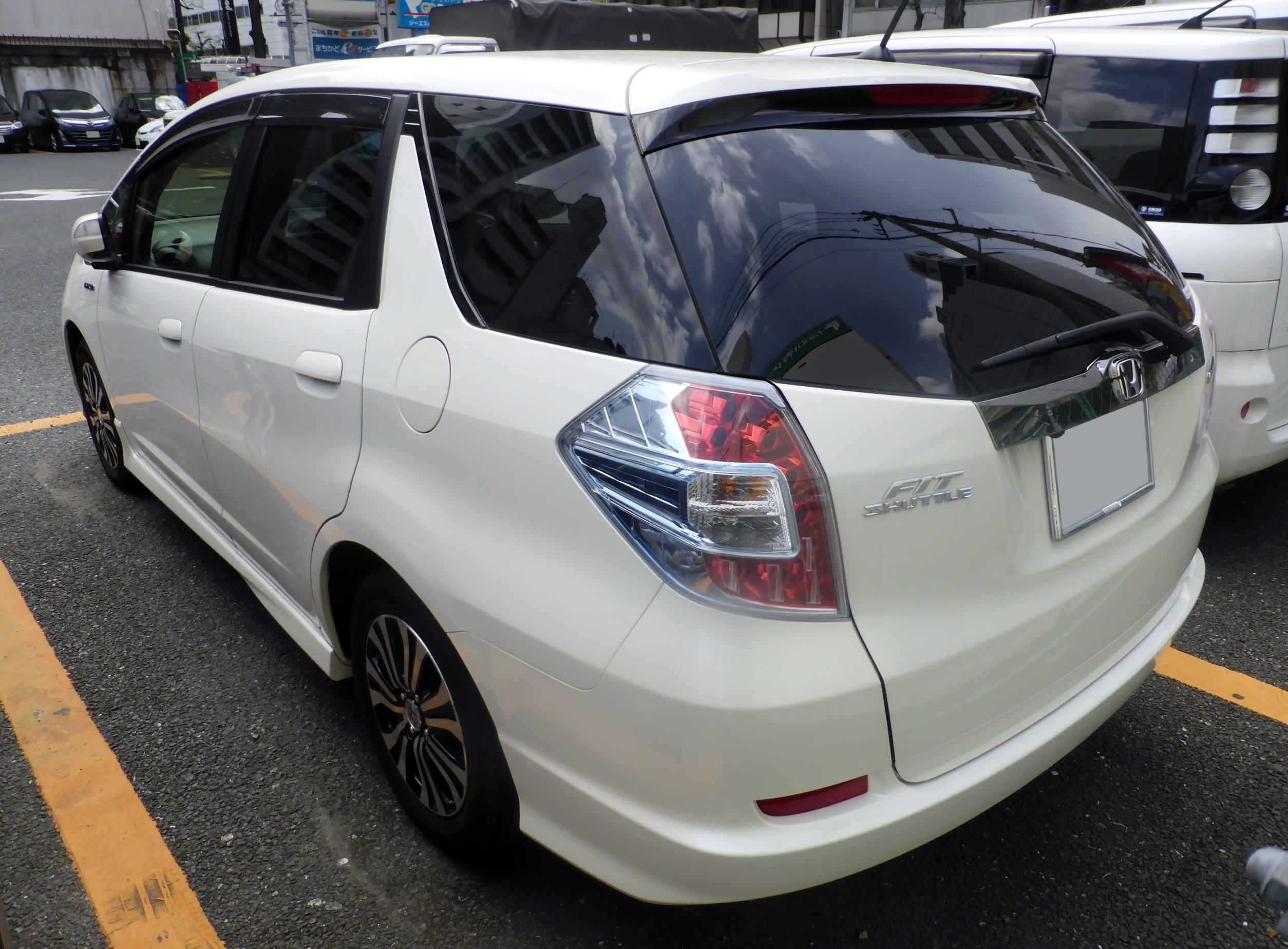
Honda Fit Shuttle Hybrid (facelift)

The launch of the car in June 2011 was pushed back from March as a result of the earthquake and tsunami in Japan on March 11, 2011. The factory responsible for the production of the car was swapped to Honda's Sayama plant in Saitama Prefecture from the Suzuka plant in Mie Prefecture as a result of power rationing after the quake. Production began in early May 2011. The Fit Shuttle was shortlisted for Car of The Year Japan 2012.

Its drivetrains are shared with the second-generation Fit. The Fit Shuttle has a 1.5 L i-VTEC engine with 120 PS (88 kW), which is optional on the Japanese-market Fit. A hybrid version, called the Fit Shuttle Hybrid, is also available, with a 1.3 L i-VTEC engine with Honda's Integrated Motor Assist. This version has 88 PS (65 kW) combined with an electric motor producing 14 PS (10 kW). CVT is the only transmission available for FWD models. A five-speed automatic transmission is standard on the four-wheel-drive models.

The fuel efficiency of the station wagon and its hybrid variant was enhanced to be the same as that of the Fit and Fit hybrid by reducing engine friction, front brake rolling resistance, improvement in aerodynamics and improvement of control efficiency of the hybrid system. All models feature ECON Mode for enhancing real-world fuel economy. Hybrid models have Eco Assist (Ecological Drive Assist System) to help the driver engage in fuel-efficient driving practices. It went on sale on June 16, 2011, in Japan.

The Fit Shuttle comes with a double-hinged two-piece load floor that both allows access to an under-floor storage bin and also functions as a divider for the cargo area. The regular luggage compartment found in front-wheel drive variants holds 496 L (17.5 cu ft), while the underfloor compartment holds 94 L (3.3 cu ft). The hybrid version keeps batteries in this area, limiting the underfloor space to 21 L (0.74 cu ft). 4WD models have a single compartment and no underfloor space. Through better sound dampening and insulation, the Fit Shuttle is pledged to be as quiet as a mid-size sedan.

== Second generation (GK8/9/GP7/8; 2015–2022) ==
Second generation
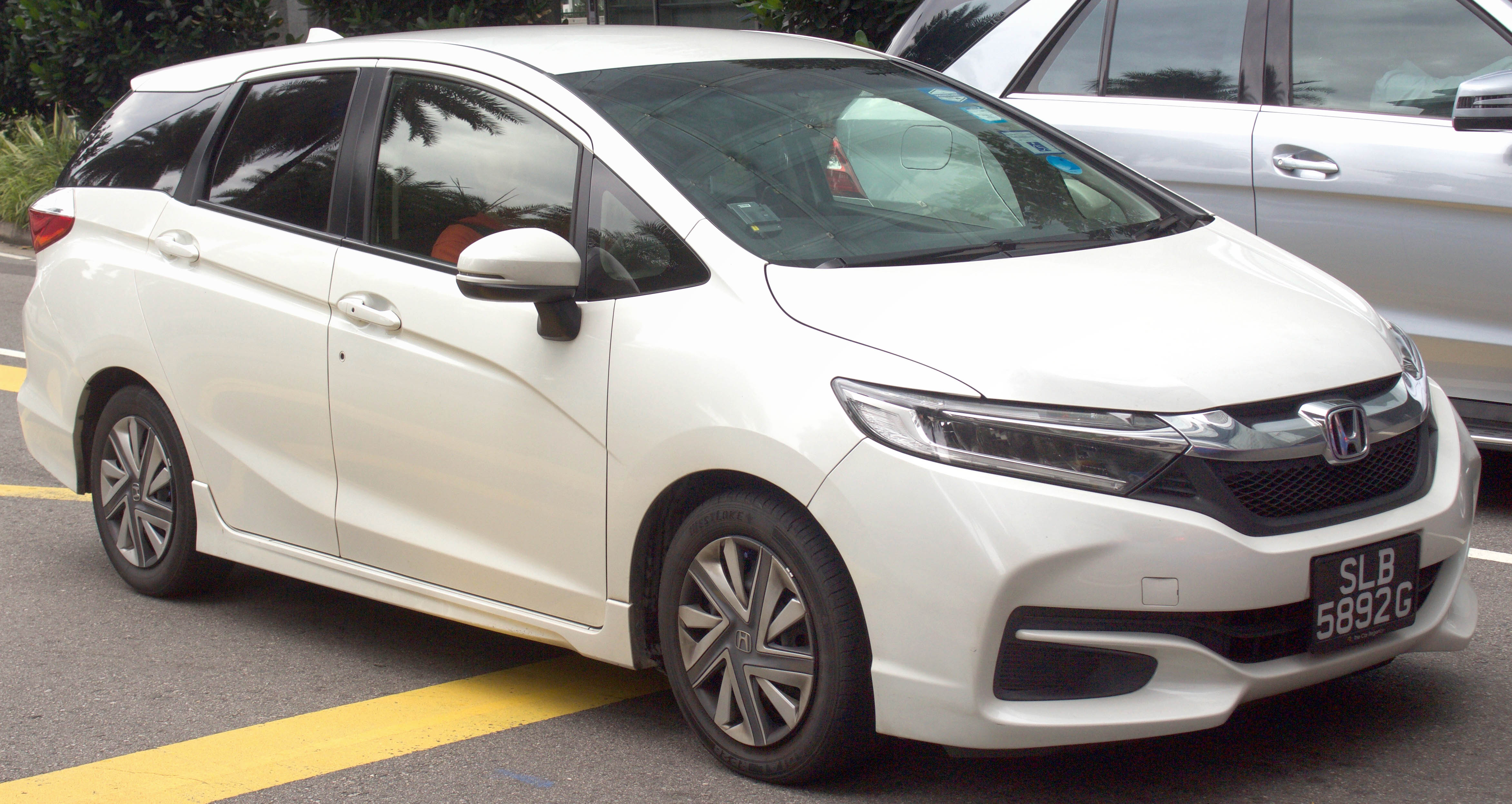
- 2016 Honda Shuttle (GP7; pre-facelift; Singapore)

Overview
- Model code: GK8; GK9; GP7; GP8
- Production: April 2015 – August 2022
- Assembly: Japan: Yorii, Saitama

Body and chassis
- Related: Honda Fit; Honda City; Honda Vezel/HR-V; Honda Freed

Powertrain
- Engine: Petrol: 1.5 L L15B Earth Dreams i-VTEC I4; Hybrid: 1.5 L LEB I4
- Transmission: 7-speed DCT (Hybrid); CVT

Dimensions
- Wheelbase: 2,530 mm (99.6 in)
- Length: 4,400 mm (173.2 in); 4,440 mm (174.8 in) (facelift)
- Width: 1,695 mm (66.7 in)
- Height: 1,545 mm (60.8 in) (FWD); 1,570 mm (61.8 in) (AWD)
- Curb weight: 1,130–1,200 kg (2,491–2,646 lb); 1,190–1,300 kg (2,624–2,866 lb) (Hybrid)

The second generation model was sold and renamed as the Honda Shuttle, unlike the previous generation model and now shares the same base with the revised third-generation Honda Fit. Honda had begun sales of the all-new Shuttle at dealerships across Japan on 15 May 2015, with the compact wagon starting from 1,990,000 yen.

The Honda Shuttle is available with either a 132 PS (130 hp; 97 kW) 1.5-litre direct-injection DOHC i-VTEC petrol engine mated to a CVT or a hybrid version equipped with the Sport Hybrid i-DCD system.

The latter pairs a 1.5-litre Atkinson cycle DOHC i-VTEC petrol engine with an electric motor integrated into the 7-speed DCT transmission and a battery pack and has a combined system output of 137 PS (135 hp; 101 kW). It is available in G, Hybrid base, Hybrid X and Hybrid Z trim levels with Honda Sensing as standard.

Honda claimed the Shuttle Hybrid averages 34 km/L (2.9 litres per 100 kilometres; 80 miles per US gallon) according to the JC08 standard. Like the previous generation, the Shuttle is also offered with a four-wheel drive option.

It received a facelift on 10 May 2019, featuring redesigned bumpers and revised rear tail lamps that stretch towards the centre of the tailgate. The seats were also redesigned.

Production of the Shuttle ended in August 2022, and it was discontinued on 10 November 2022.

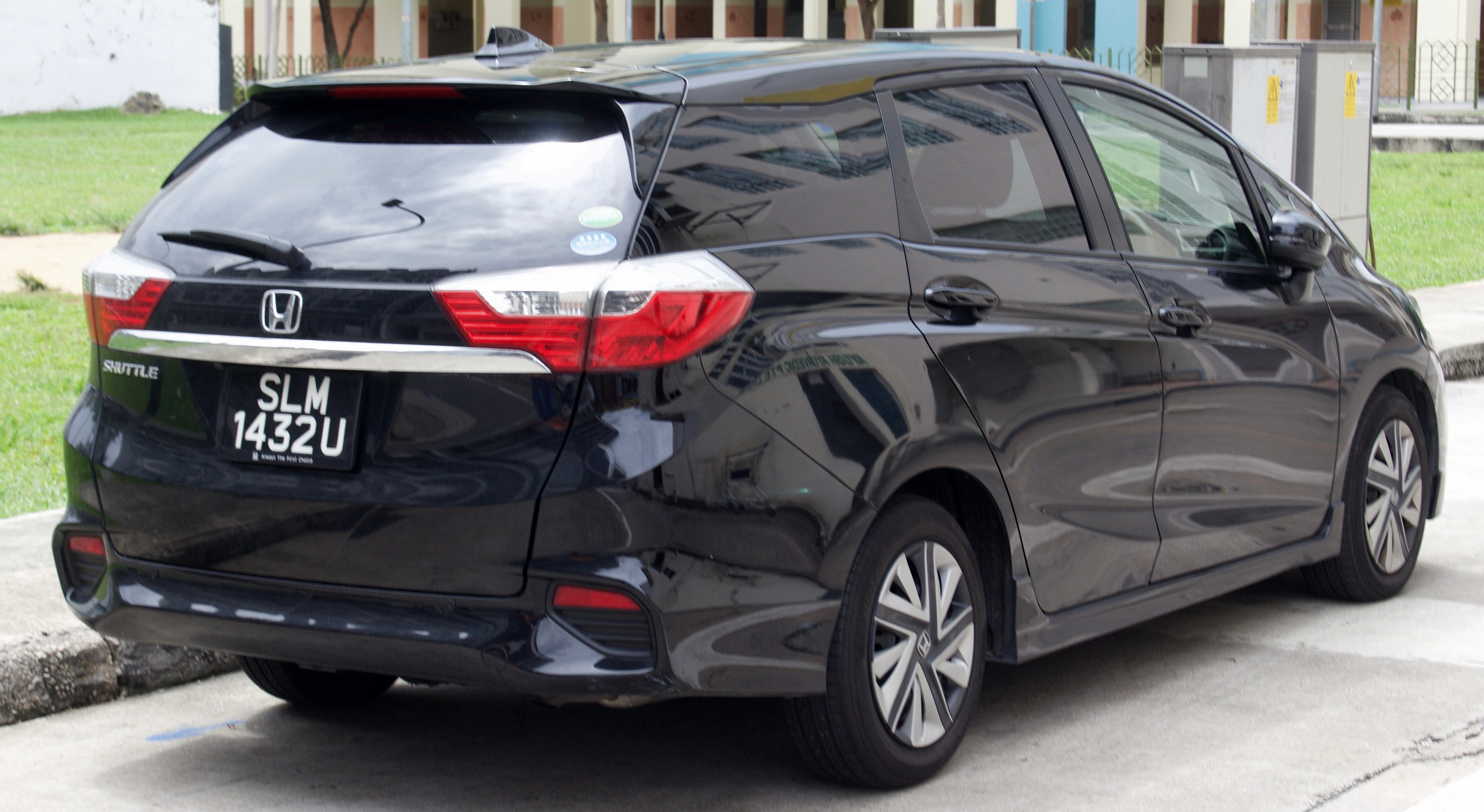
Rear view (pre-facelift)

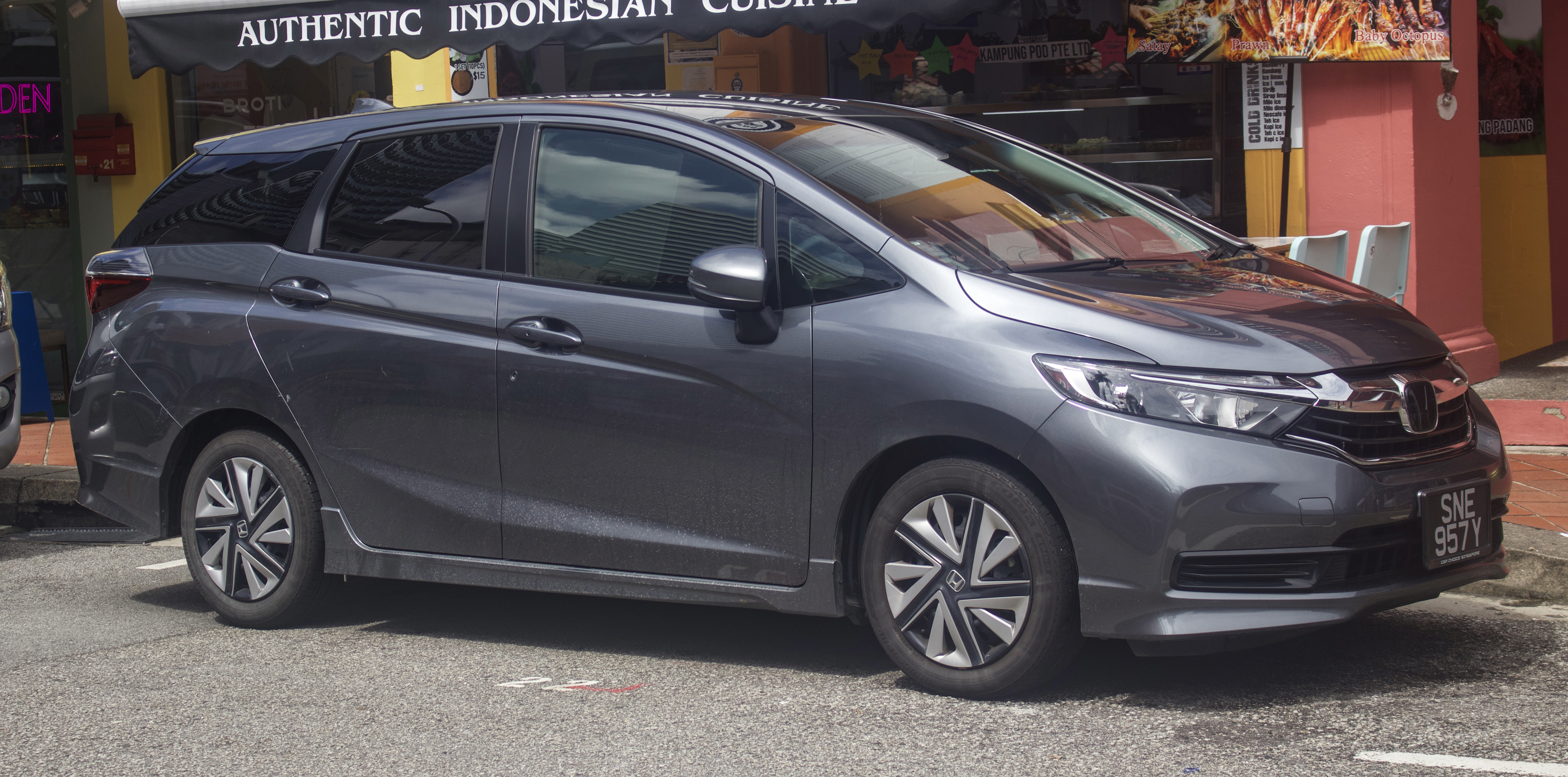
Honda Shuttle (GP7; facelift)

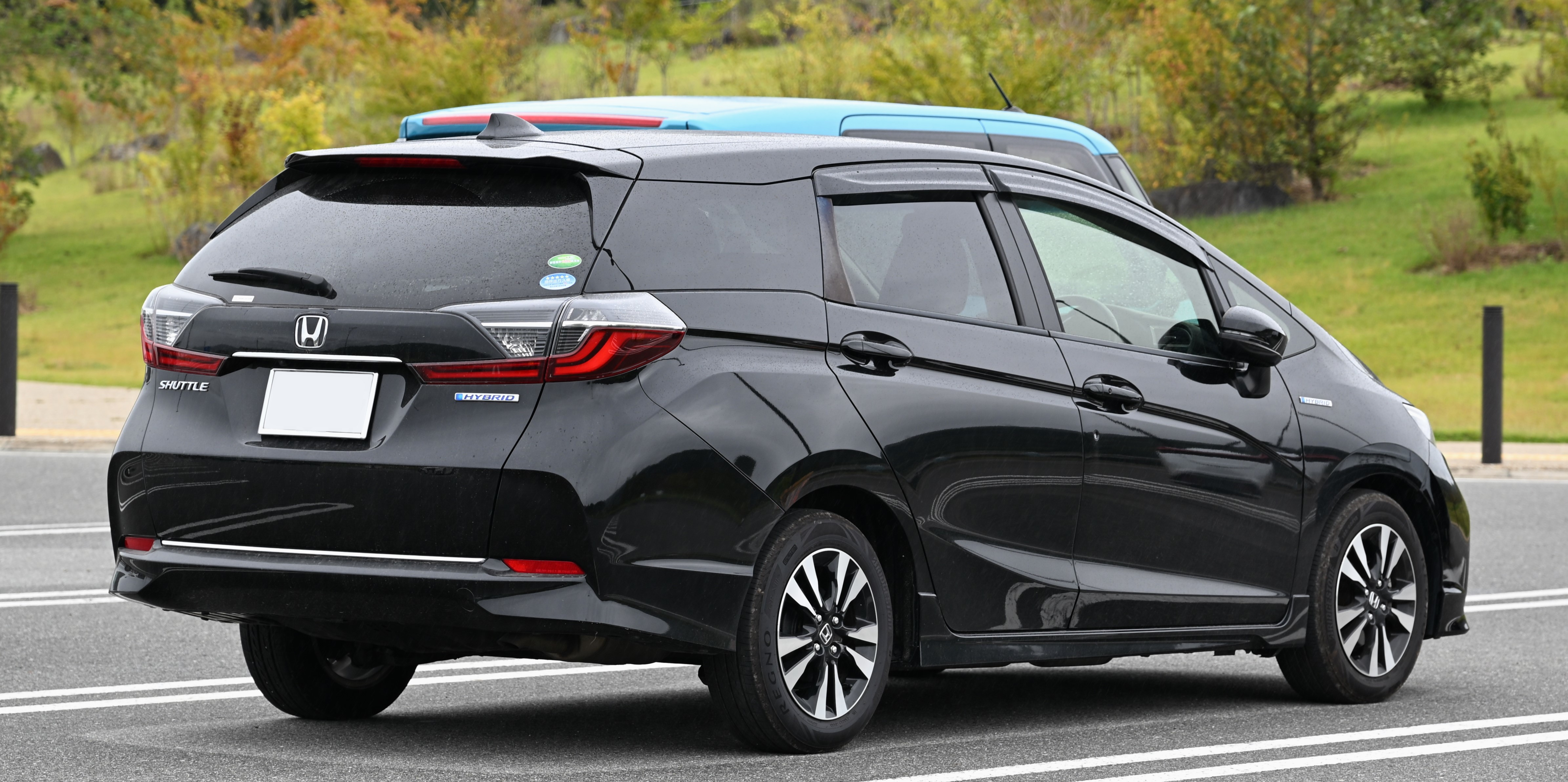
Honda Shuttle (GP7; facelift, rear view)

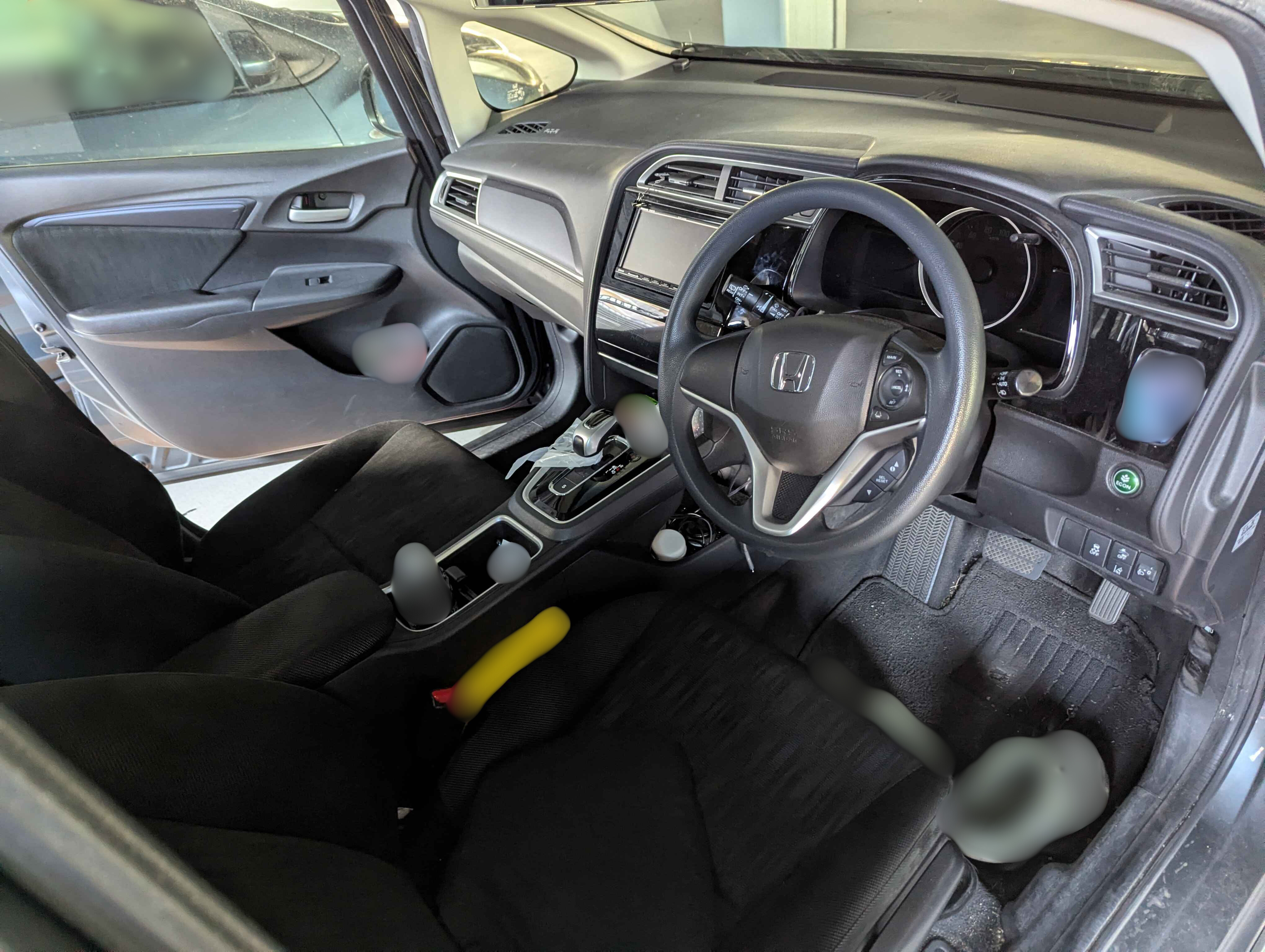
Interior (facelift)

== Sales ==
In June 2011, Honda originally set a monthly sales target at 4,000 units for the Shuttle. The first generation handily exceeded this goal, selling in 6-digit number figures – however, the second generation declined considerably in sales, dropping by about 80 percent.

Year	Japan
2011	207,882
2012	209,276
2013	181,414
2014	202,838
2015	34,992
2016	42,514
2017	28,111
2018	28,789
2019	30,856
2020	16,703
2021	13,636
2022	12,941
2023	742
