= List of Honda vehicles =

== Aircraft ==
- HA-420 HondaJet
- Honda MH02 (experimental aircraft)
