= Sports car =

Performance-oriented car class

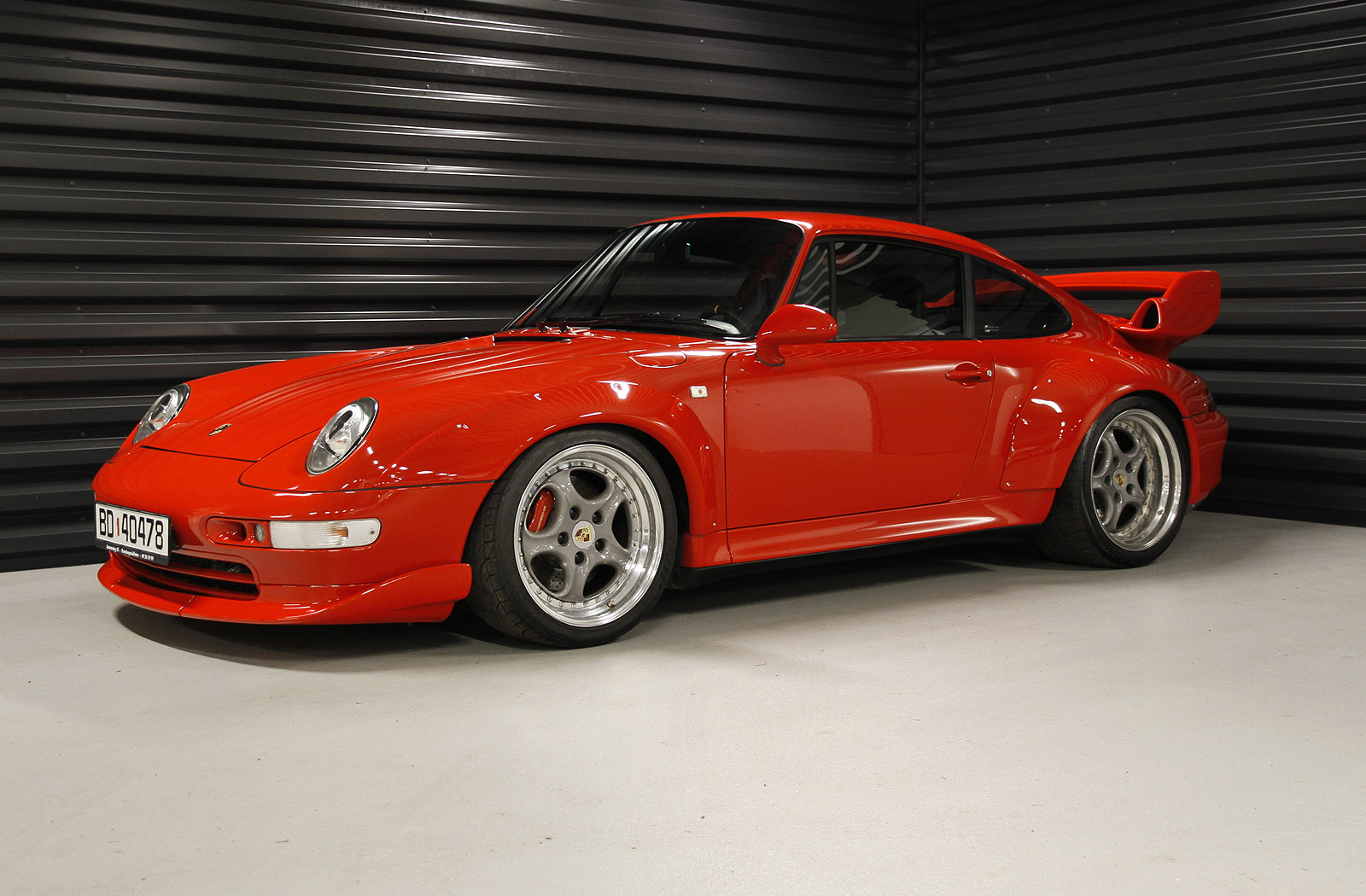
1996 Porsche 911 GT2 (993 generation), a model homologated for sports car racing

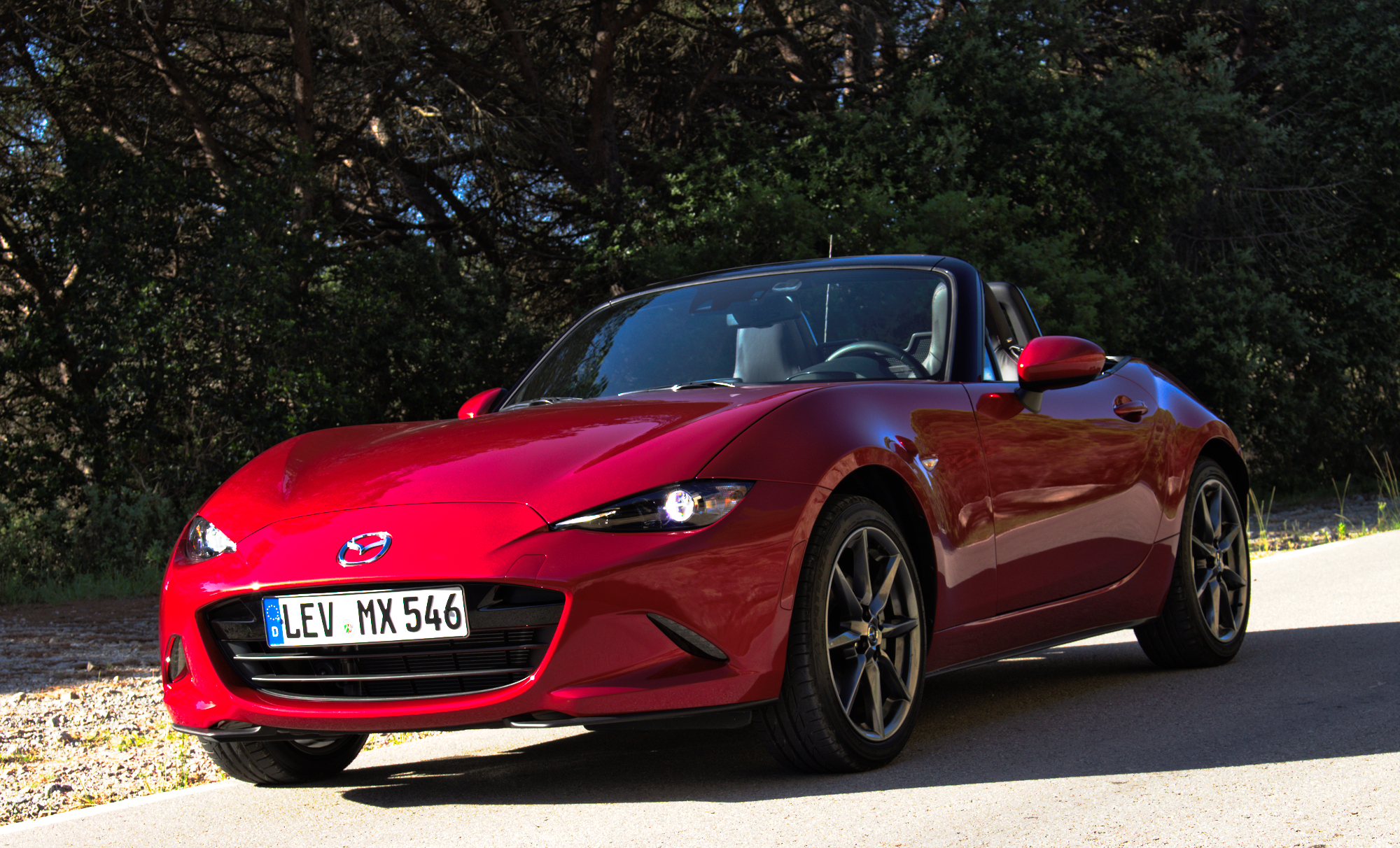
2015 Mazda MX-5 (ND), one of the world's best-selling sports cars

A sports car is a type of automobile that is designed with an emphasis on dynamic performance, such as handling, acceleration, top speed, the thrill of driving, and racing capability. Sports cars originated in Europe in the early 1910s and are currently produced by many manufacturers around the world.

== Definition ==
Definitions of sports cars often relate to how the car design is optimised for dynamic performance, without any specific minimum requirements; both a Triumph Spitfire and Ferrari 488 Pista can be considered sports cars, despite vastly different levels of performance. Broader definitions of sports cars include cars "in which performance takes precedence over carrying capacity", or that emphasise the "thrill of driving" or are marketed "using the excitement of speed and the glamour of the (race)track". However, other people have more specific definitions, such as "must be a two-seater or a 2+2 seater" or a car with two seats only.

In the United Kingdom, early recorded usage of the "sports car" was in The Times newspaper in 1919. The first known use of the term in the United States was in 1928. Sports cars started to become popular during the 1920s. The term initially described two-seat roadsters (cars without a fixed roof), however, since the 1970s the term has also been used for cars with a fixed roof (which were previously considered grand tourers).

Attributing the definition of "sports car" to any particular model can be controversial or the subject of debate among enthusiasts. Authors and experts have often contributed their ideas to capture a definition. Insurance companies have also attempted to use mathematical formulae to categorise sports cars, often charging more for insurance due to the inherent risk of performance driving.

There is no fixed distinction between sports cars and other categories of performance cars, such as muscle cars and grand tourers, with some cars being members of several categories.

== Common characteristics ==
=== Seating layout ===
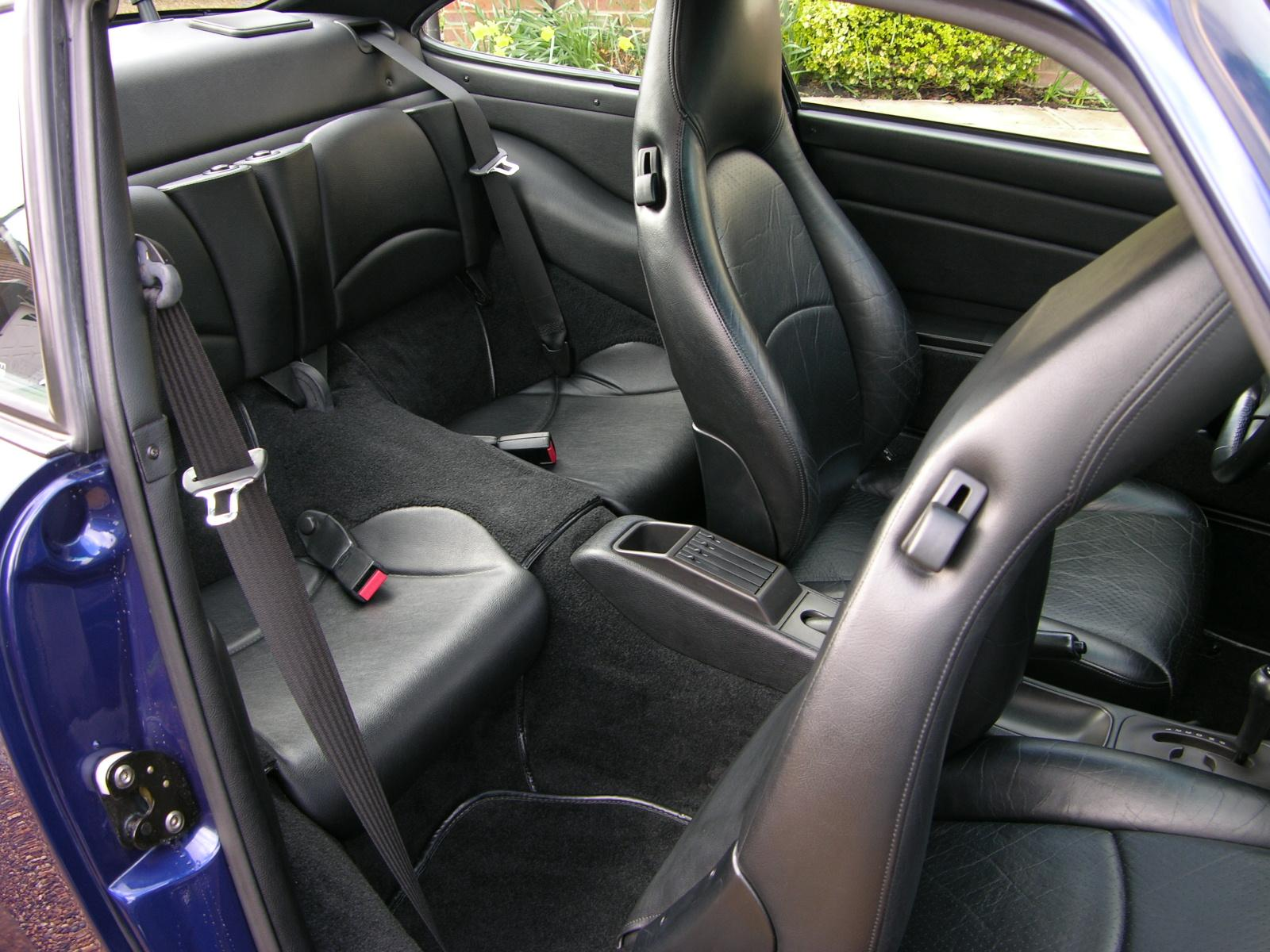
2+2 layout (Porsche 911)

Traditionally, the most common layout for sports cars was a roadster (a two-seat car without a fixed roof). However, there are also several examples of early sports cars with four seats.

Sports cars are not usually intended to transport more than two adult occupants regularly, so most modern sports cars are generally two-seat or 2+2 layout (two smaller rear seats for children or occasional adult use). Larger cars with more spacious rear-seat accommodation are usually considered sports sedans rather than sports cars.

The 1993–1998 McLaren F1 is notable for using a three-seat layout, where the front row consists of a centrally located driver's seat.

=== Engine and drivetrain layout ===
The location of the engine and driven wheels significantly influence the handling characteristics of a car and are therefore crucial in the design of a sports car. Traditionally, most sports cars have used rear-wheel drive with the engine either located at the front (FR layout) or in the middle of the vehicle (MR layout). Examples of FR layout sports cars include the Caterham 7, Mazda MX-5, and the Dodge Viper. Examples of MR layout sports cars are the Ferrari 488, Ford GT, and Toyota MR2. To avoid a front-heavy weight distribution, many FR layout sports cars are designed so that the engine is located further back in the engine bay, as close to the firewall as possible.

Since the 1990s, all-wheel drive has become more common in sports cars. All-wheel drive offers better acceleration and favorable handling characteristics (especially in slippery conditions), but is often heavier and more mechanically complex than traditional layouts. Examples of all-wheel drive sports cars are the Lamborghini Huracan, Bugatti Veyron, and Nissan GT-R.

Rear engine layouts are not typical for sports cars, with the notable exception of the Porsche 911.

The front-wheel drive layout with the engine at the front (FF layout) is generally the most common for cars, but it is not as common among traditional sports cars. Nonetheless, the FF layout is used by sport compacts and hot hatches such as the Mazdaspeed3. Sports cars with an FF layout include the Fiat Barchetta, Saab Sonett, and Opel Tigra.

== Europe ==
=== 1895–1917: Brass era of cars ===
The ancestor of all high-performance cars had its origin in Germany. The 28-h.p. Cannstatt-Daimler racing car of 1899 was without a doubt the first attempt to give real performance to a road car. Many of its features, such as a honeycomb radiator and gate gear change, were continued on the much improved version which Paul Daimler designed in 1899-1900. This was of course the famous Mercedes. It also laid down standards of chassis design which were to be followed, almost unthinkingly, for the next thirty years. Several variants of the car appeared during the next year or two, all conforming to the same basic design and earning for themselves a reputation second to none for fast and reliable travel. The 60-h.p. cars were announced late in 1902. The cars were possessed of a very real performance superior to anything else which could be bought at the time... and the model achieved an almost invincible position among the fast cars of its day.

— The Sports Car: Development and Design

The basis for the sports car is traced to the early 20th century touring cars and roadsters, and the term 'sports car' would not be coined until after World War One.

A car considered to be "a sports-car years ahead of its time" is the 1903 Mercedes Simplex 60 hp, described at the time as a fast touring car and designed by Wilhelm Maybach and Paul Daimler. The Mercedes included pioneering features such as a pressed-steel chassis, a gated 4-speed transmission, pushrod-actuated overhead inlet valves, a honeycomb radiator, low-tension magneto ignition, a long wheelbase, a low center of mass and a very effective suspension system. The overall result was a "safe and well-balanced machine" with a higher performance than any other contemporary production car. At the 1903 Gordon Bennett Cup, a production Simplex 60 hp was entered only due to a specially built 90 hp racing car being destroyed in a fire; the 60 hp famously went on to win the race.

The 1910 Austro-Daimler 27/80 is another early sports car which had success in motor racing. The 27/80 was designed by Ferdinand Porsche, who drove the car to victory in the 1910 Prince Henry Tour motor race. The Vauxhall and Austro-Daimler —like the Mercedes Simplex 60 hp— were production fast touring cars. The 1912 Hispano-Suiza Alfonso XIII is also considered one of the earliest sports cars, as it was a "purpose built, high performance, two-seater production automobile". The model was named after King Alfonso XIII of Spain, a patron of the car's chief designer and an enthusiast for the marque. Other early sports cars include the 1905 Isotta Fraschini Tipo D, the 1906 Rolls-Royce Silver Ghost, the 1908 Delage, the 1910 Bugatti Type 13, and the 1912 DFP 12/15.

Early motor racing events included the 1903 Paris–Madrid race, the 1905–1907 Herkomer Trophy, the 1908–1911 Prince Henry Tour and the 1911–present Monte Carlo Rally. The Prince Henry Tours (which were similar to modern car rallies) were among the sporting events of the period, bringing renown to successful entrants. The Prince Henry Tours started the evolution of reasonably large and technically advanced production sports cars.

In England, the development of sporting cars was inhibited by the Motor Car Act 1903, which imposed a speed limit of 20 mph (32 km/h) on all public roads. This led to the 1907 opening of the Brooklands motor circuit, which inspired the development of performance cars such as the 1910 Vauxhall Prince Henry, 1910 Sunbeam 12/16, 1910 Talbot 25 hp, 1910 Straker-Squire 15 hp and 1913 Star 15.9 hp.

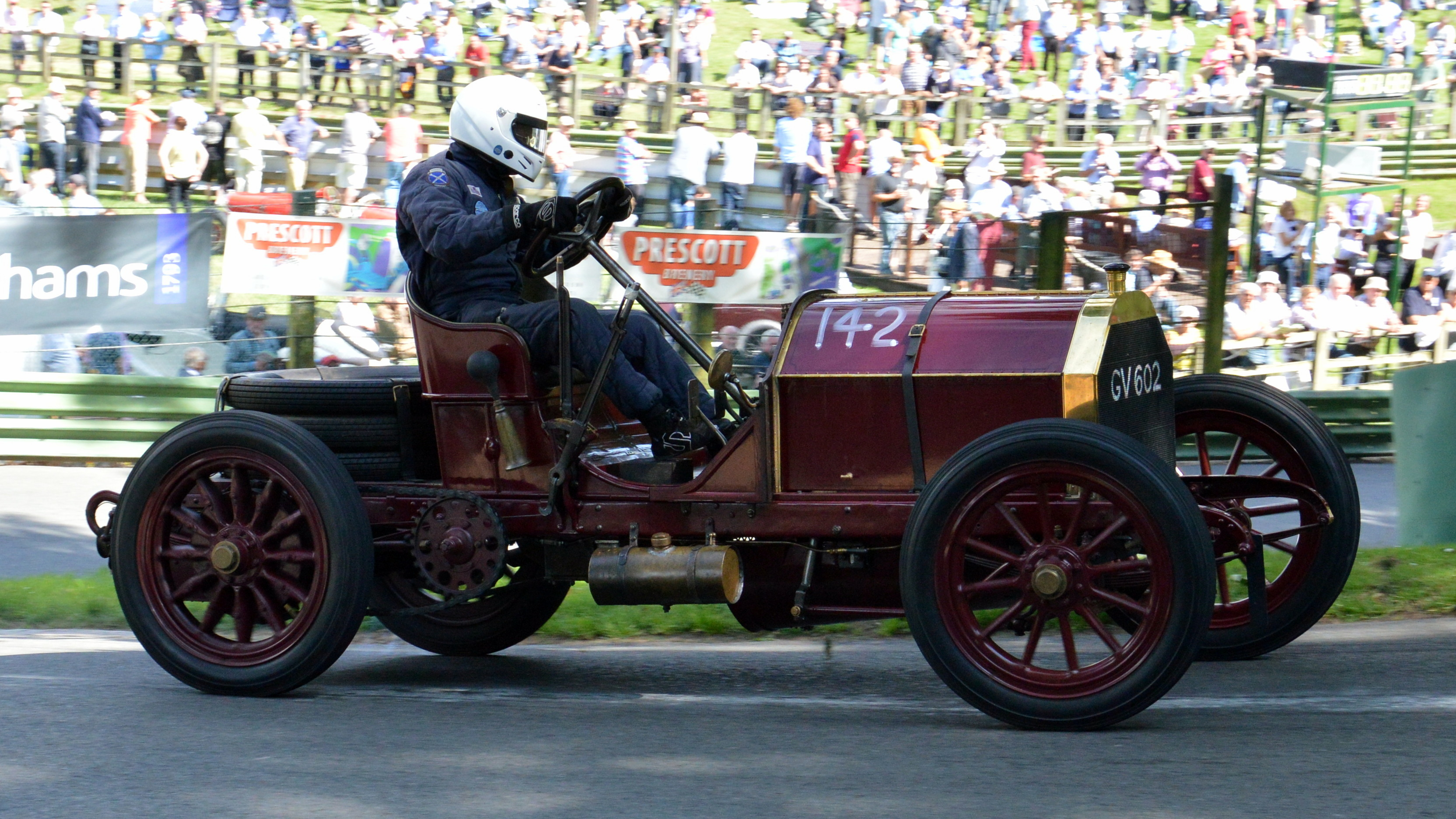
Mercedes Simplex 60 hp (1903)

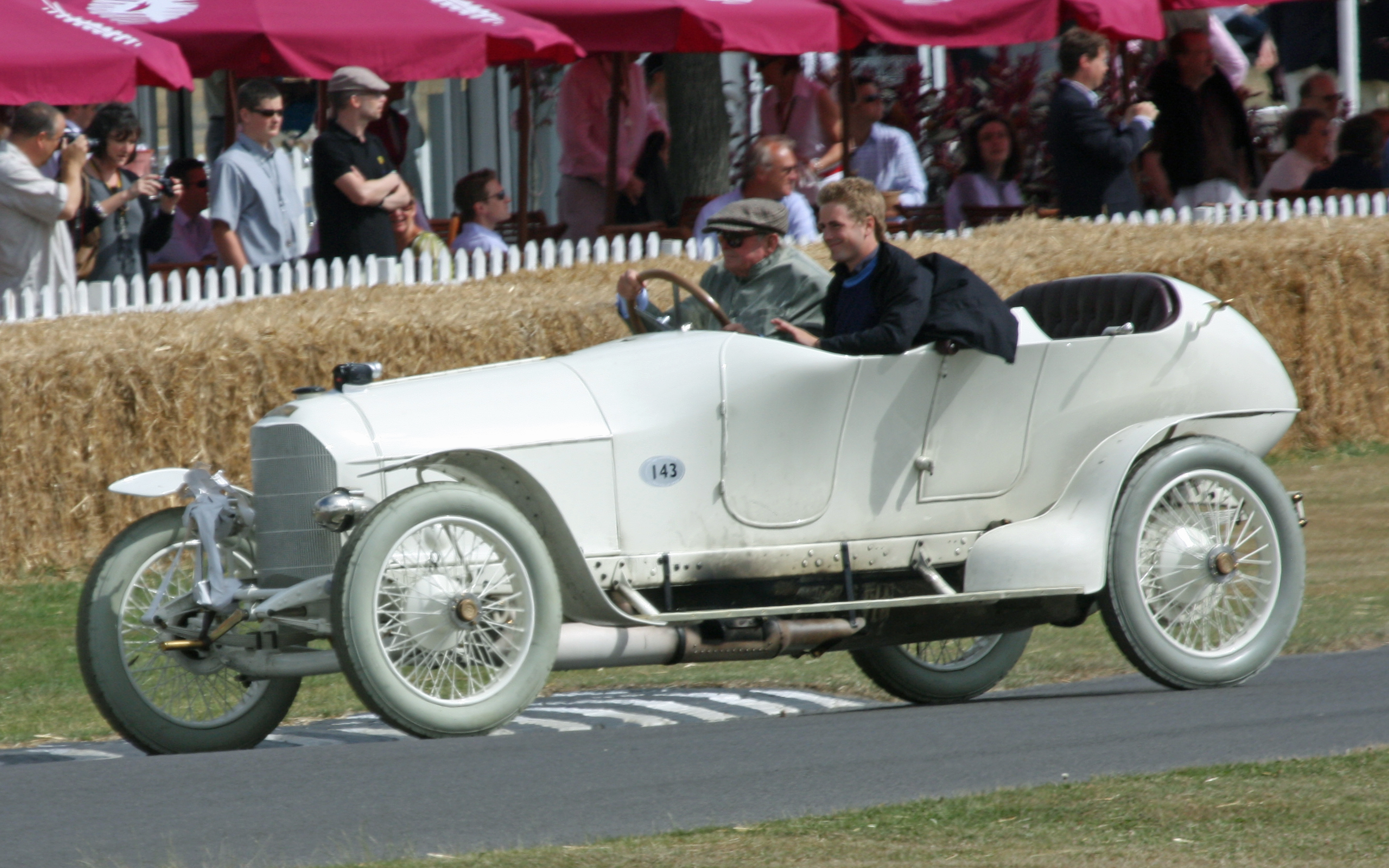
Austro-Daimler Prince Henry (1910–1914)

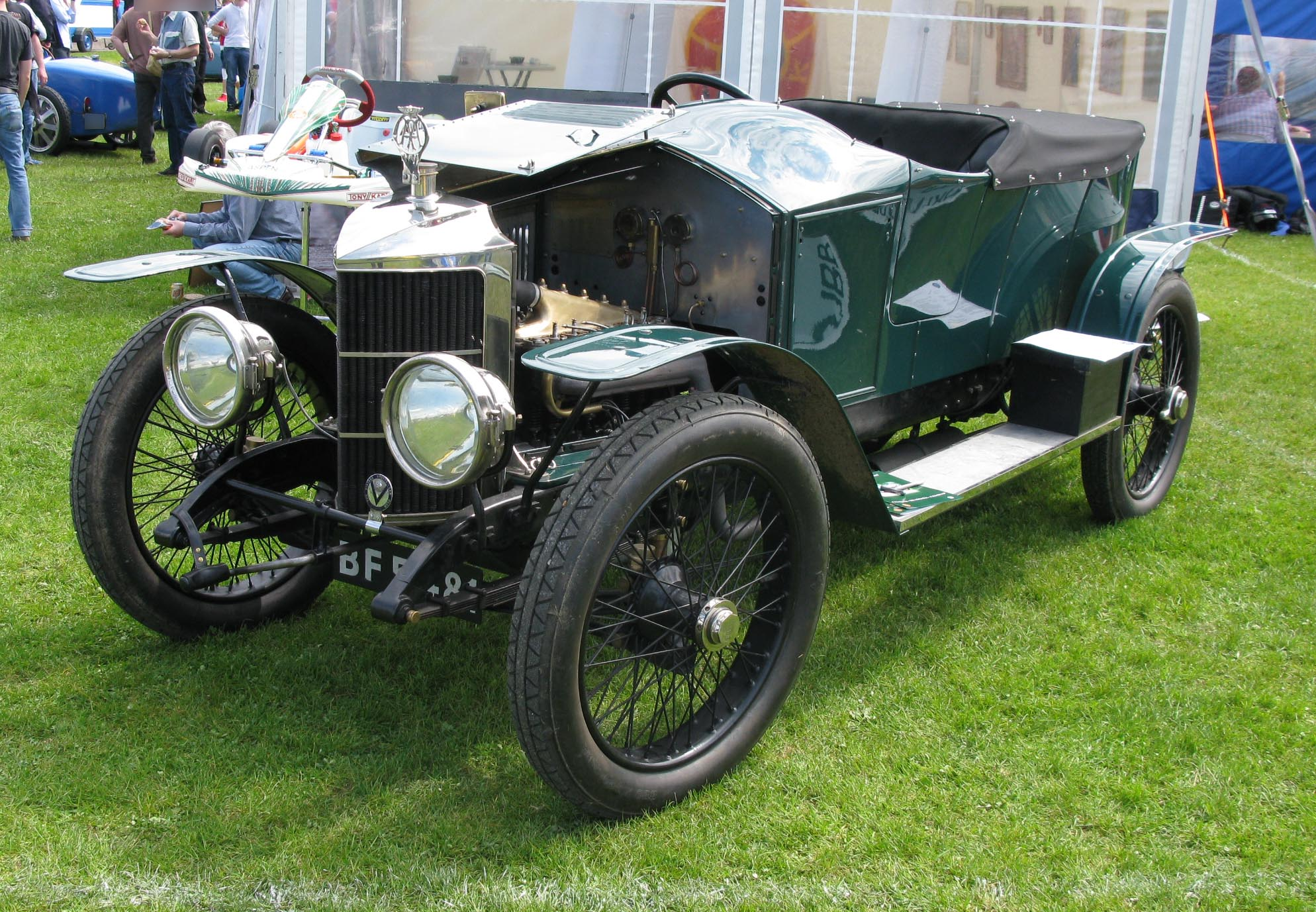
Vauxhall Prince Henry (1912)

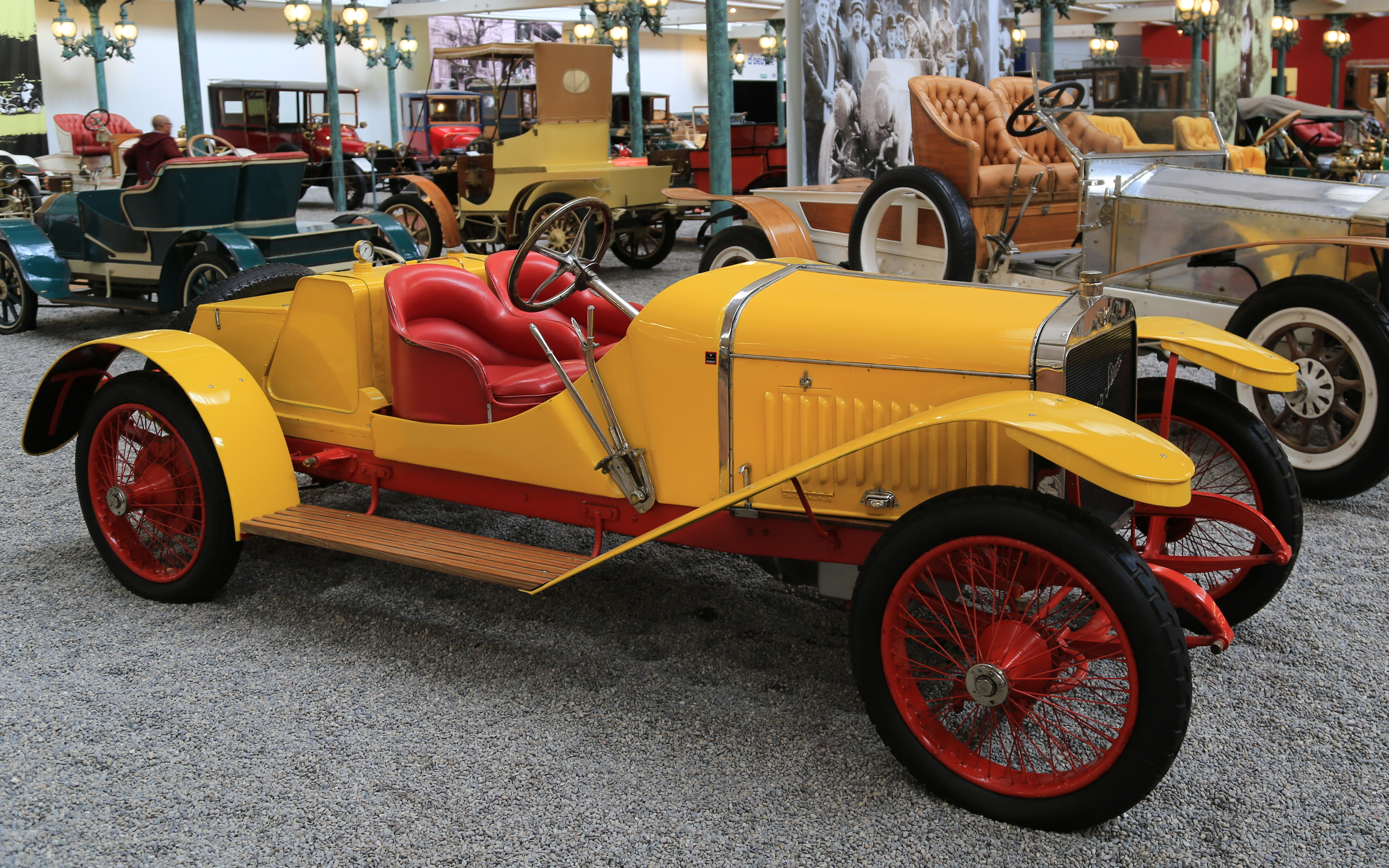
Hispano-Suiza Alfonso XIII (1912)

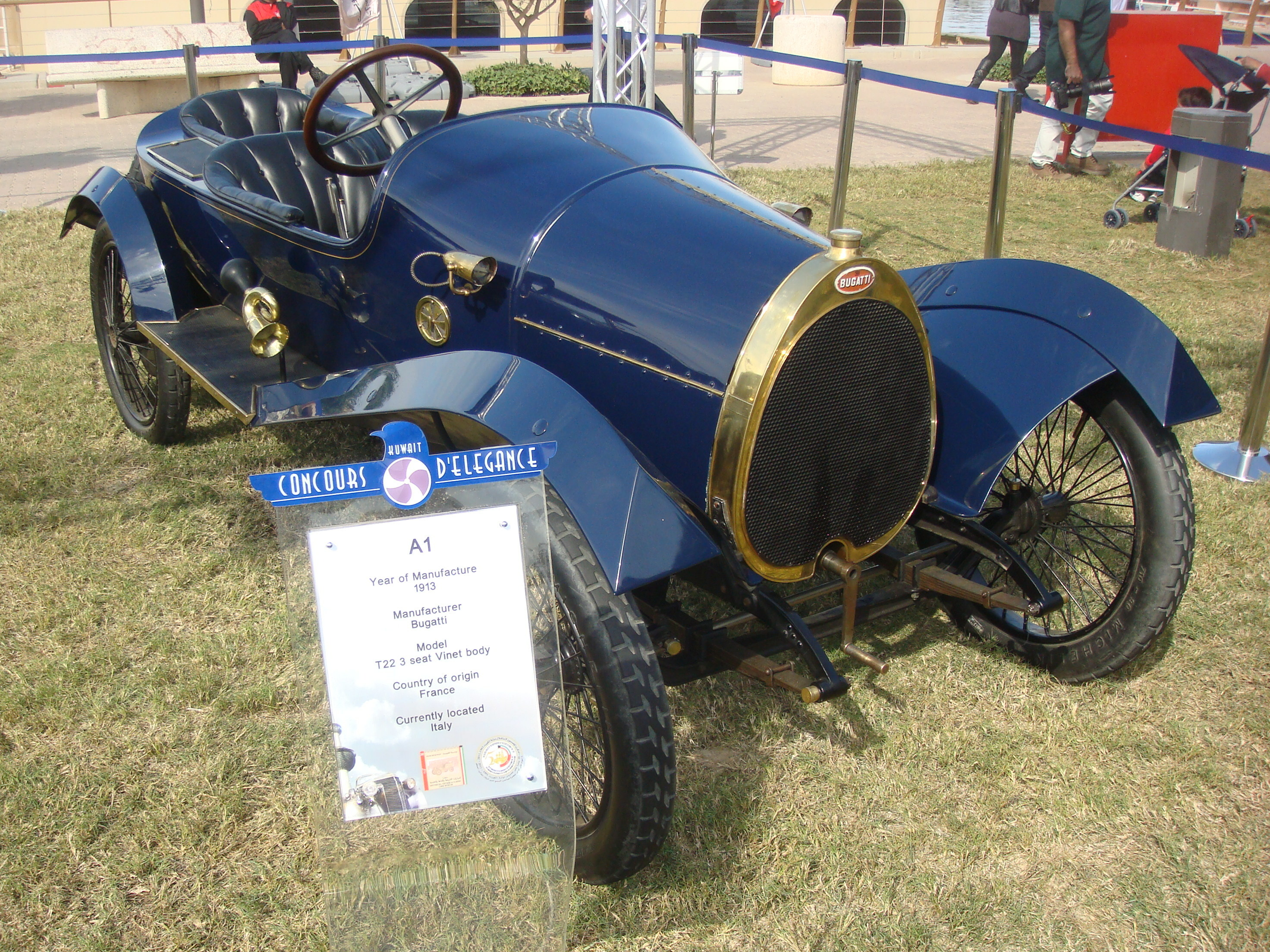
Bugatti Type 22 (1913)

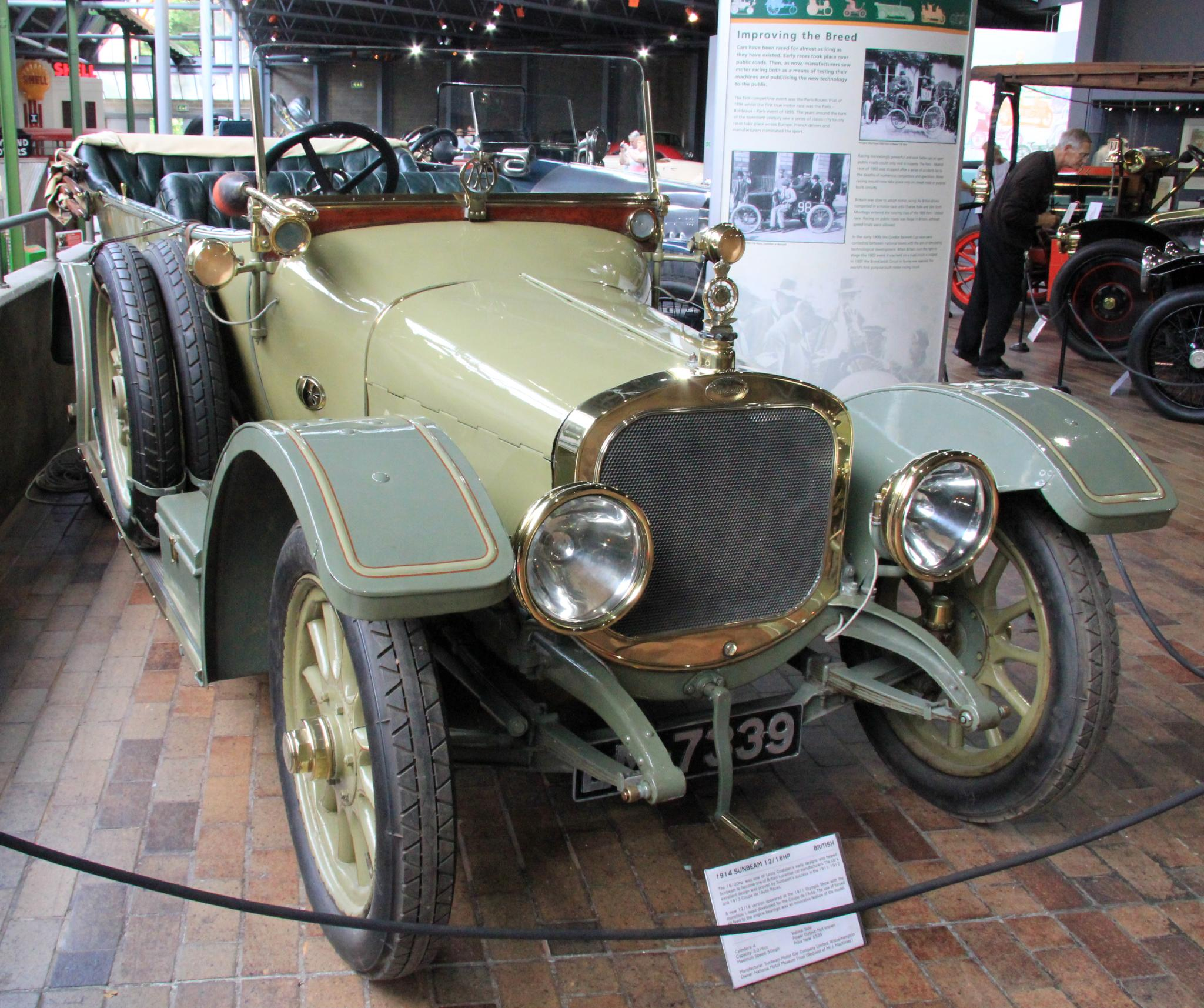
Sunbeam 12/16 (1914)

=== 1919–1929: Vintage era cars ===
Following the halt in sports car production caused by World War I, Europe returned to manufacturing automobiles from around 1920. It was around this time that the term 'Sports Car' began to appear in the motor catalogues, although the exact origin of the name is not known. The decade that followed became known as the vintage era and featured rapid technical advances over the preceding Brass Era cars. Engine performance benefited from the abandonment of "tax horsepower" (where vehicles were taxed based on bore and number of cylinders, rather than actual power output) and the introduction of leaded fuel, which increased power by allowing for higher compression ratios.

In the early 1920s, the cost to produce a racing car was not significantly higher than a road car, therefore several manufacturers used the design from the current year's racing car for the next year's sports car. For example, the 1921 Ballot 2LS based on the racing car that finished third at the 1921 French Grand Prix. The Benz 28/95PS was also a successful racing car, with victories including the 1921 Coppa Florio. Another approach— such as that used by Morris Garages— was to convert touring cars into sports cars.

The first 24 Hours of Le Mans race for sports cars was held in 1923, although the two-seat sports cars only competed in the smallest class, with the majority of cars entered being four-seat fast touring cars. "This race, together with the Tourist Trophy Series of Races, organised after the first World War by the R.A.C., appealed to the public imagination and offered to the manufacturers of the more sporting cars an excellent opportunity for boosting sales of their products." The classic Italian road races— the Targa Florio, and the Mille Miglia (first held in 1927)— also captured the public's imagination.

By 1925, the higher profits available for four-seater cars resulted in the production of two-seat sports cars being limited to smaller manufacturers such as Aston-Martin (350 Astons built from 1921 to 1939) and Frazer-Nash (323 cars built from 1924 to 1939). Then by the late 1920s, the cost of producing racing cars (especially Grand Prix cars) escalated, causing more manufacturers to produce cars for the growing sports car market instead.

Significant manufacturers of sports cars in the late 1920s were AC Cars, Alfa Romeo, Alvis, Amilcar, Bignan and Samson, Chenard-Walcker, Delage, Hispano-Suiza, Hotchkiss, Mercedes-Benz and Nazzaro. Two cars from the Vintage Era that would influence sports cars for many years were the Austin Seven and MG M-type "Midget". Successful sports cars from Bentley during this era were the Bentley 3 Litre (1921–1929) and the Bentley Speed Six (1928–1930), with the former famously described by Bugatti's founder as "the fastest lorry in the world".

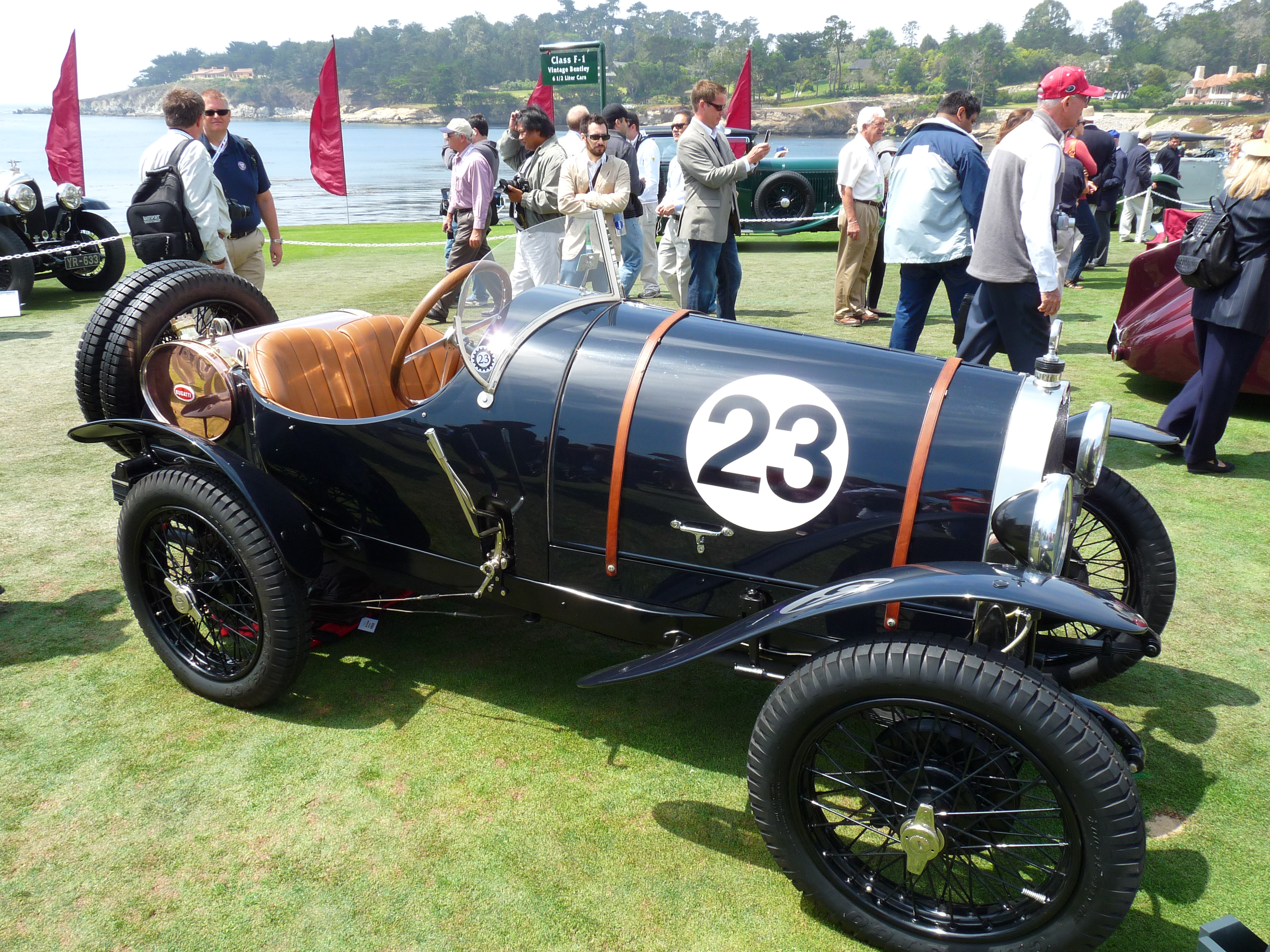
Bugatti Type 13 Brescia (1920)

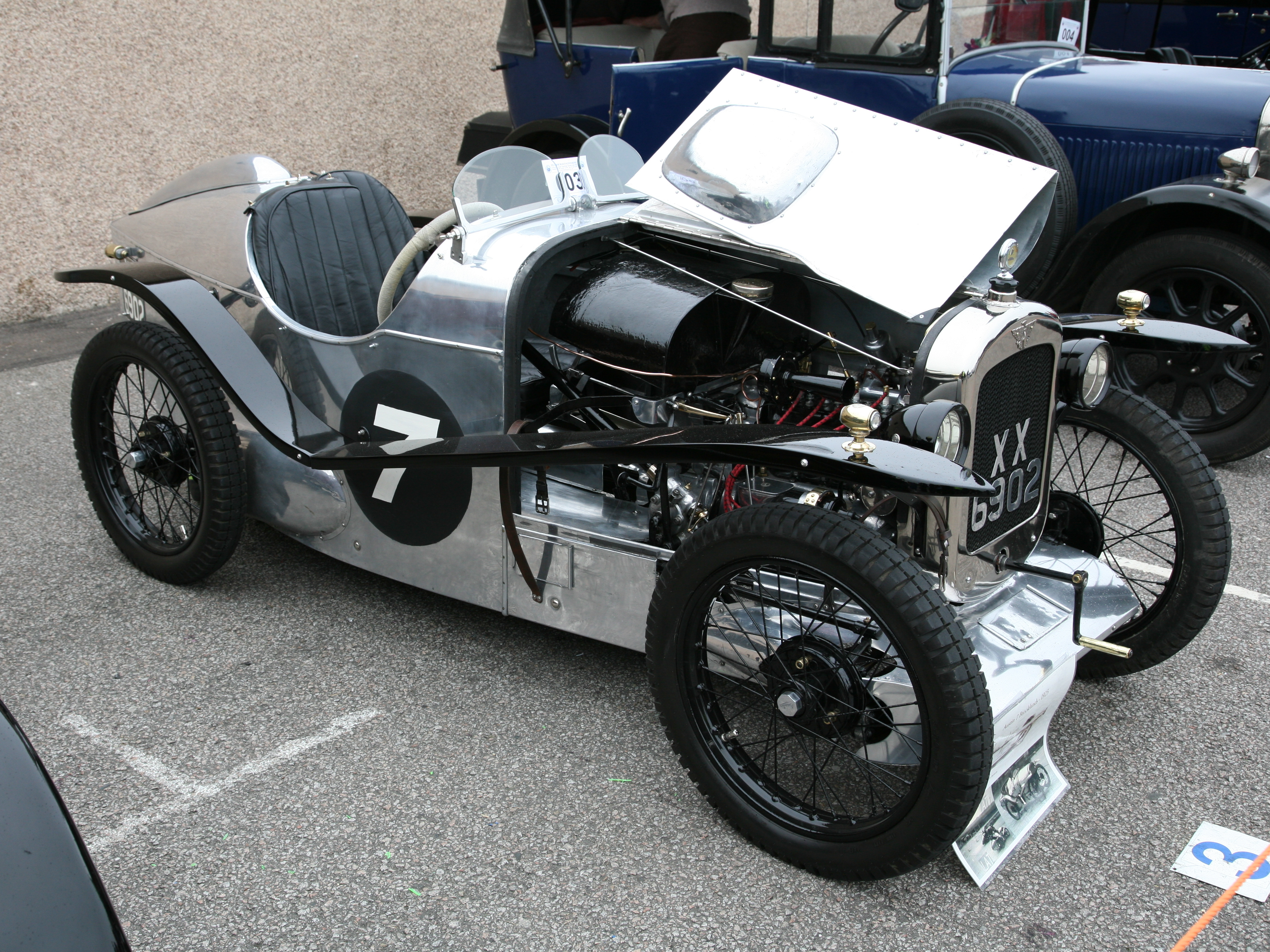
Austin 7 Brooklands (1927)

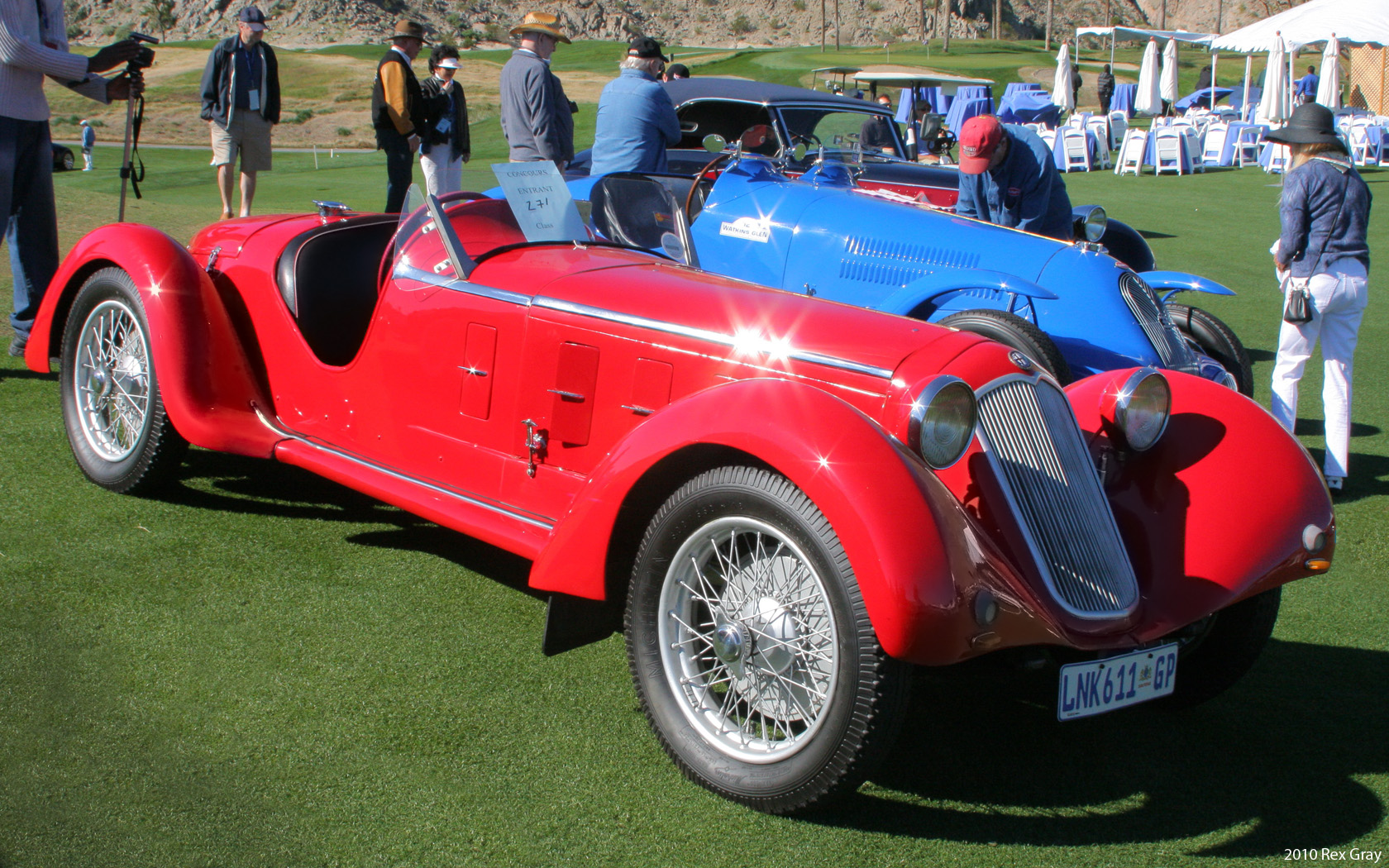
Alfa Romeo 6C (1929)

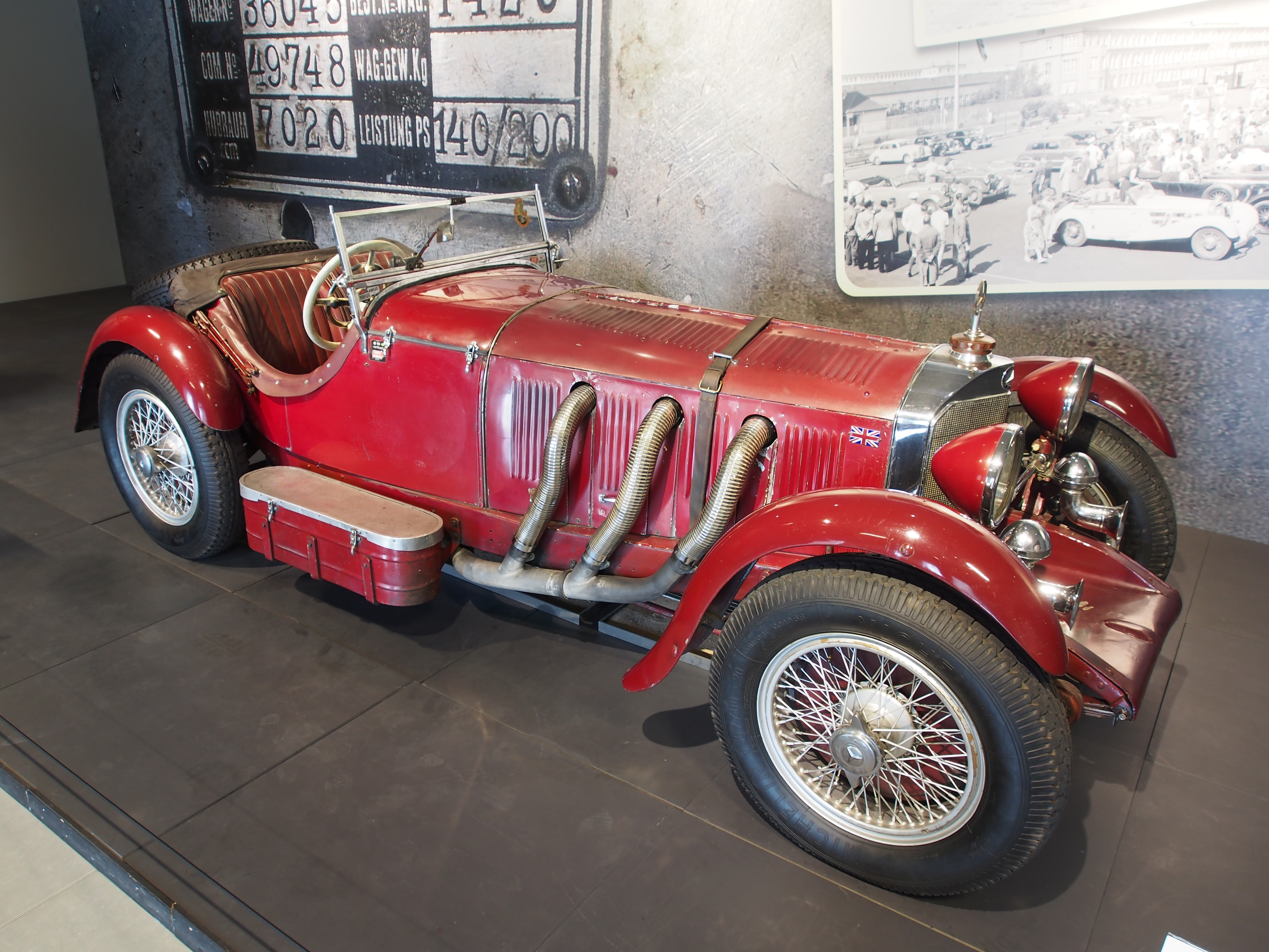
Mercedes-Benz SSK (1929)

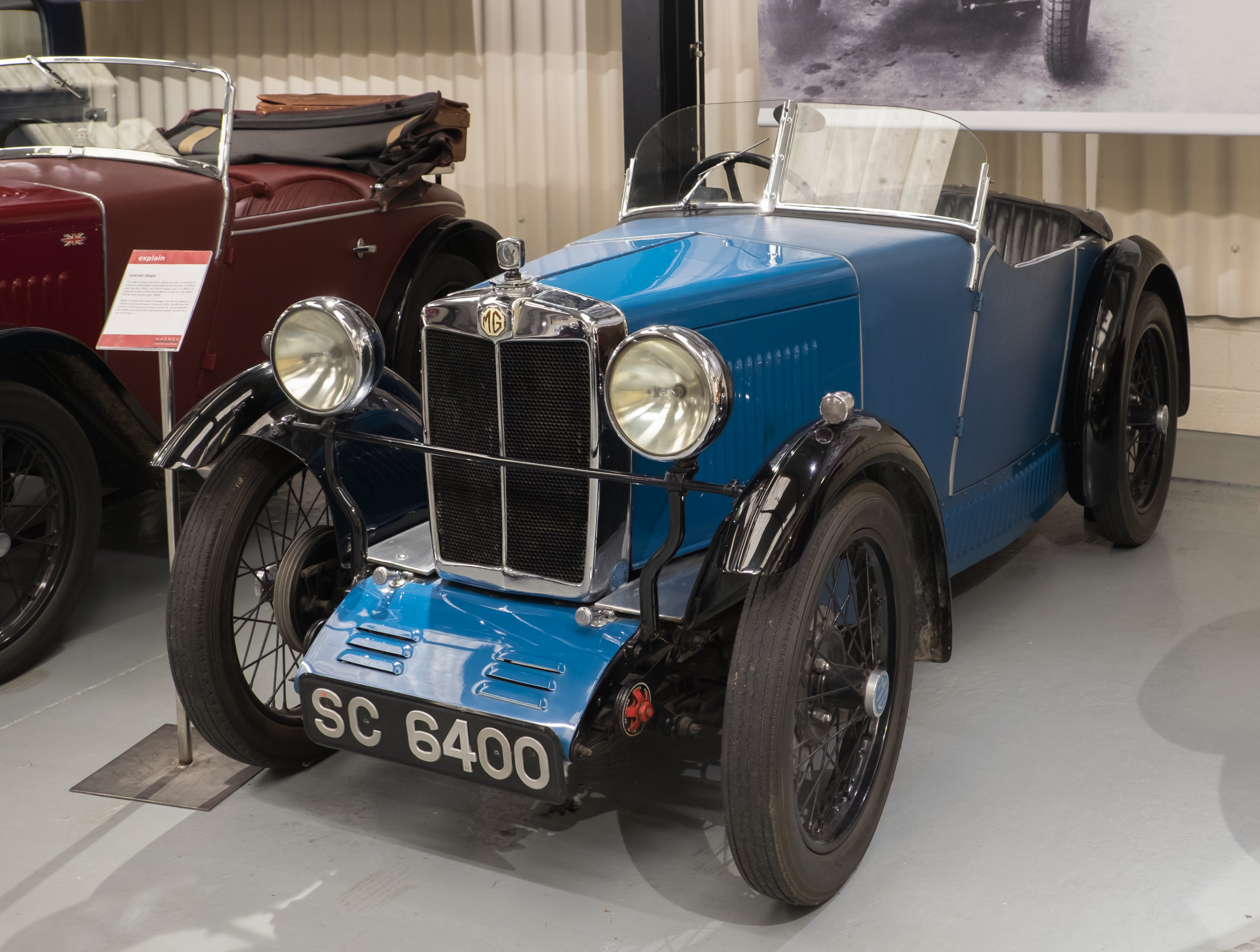
MG M-type Midget (1930)

=== 1930–1939: Pre-war era cars ===
Between the Great Depression and the World War II the pre-war era was a period of decline in importance for sports car manufacturers, although the period was not devoid of advances, for example streamlining. Cheap, light-weight family sedans with independent front suspension— such as the BMW 303, Citroën Traction Avant and Fiat 508— offered similar handling and comfort to the more expensive sports cars. Powerful, reliable, and economical (although softly suspended) American saloons began to be imported to Europe in significant numbers. Sports car ownership was increased through models such as the Austin 7 and Wolseley Hornet six, however many of these sports cars did not offer any performance upgrades over the mass-produced cars upon which they were based.

The highest selling sports car company of the 1930s was Morris Garages, who produced 'MG Midget' models of the M-Type, J-Type, P-Type and T-Type. The K3 version of the K-Type Magnette was a successful racing car, achieving success in the Mille Miglia, Tourist Trophy and 24 Hours of Le Mans.

The Bugatti Type 57 (1934-1940) was another significant sports car of the pre-war era and is now among the most valuable cars in the world. The T57 was successful in sports car races, including winning the 1937 24 Hours of Le Mans and 1939 24 Hours of Le Mans. Another successful Bugatti sports car was the Bugatti Type 55 (1932-1935), which was based on the Type 51 Grand Prix racing car.

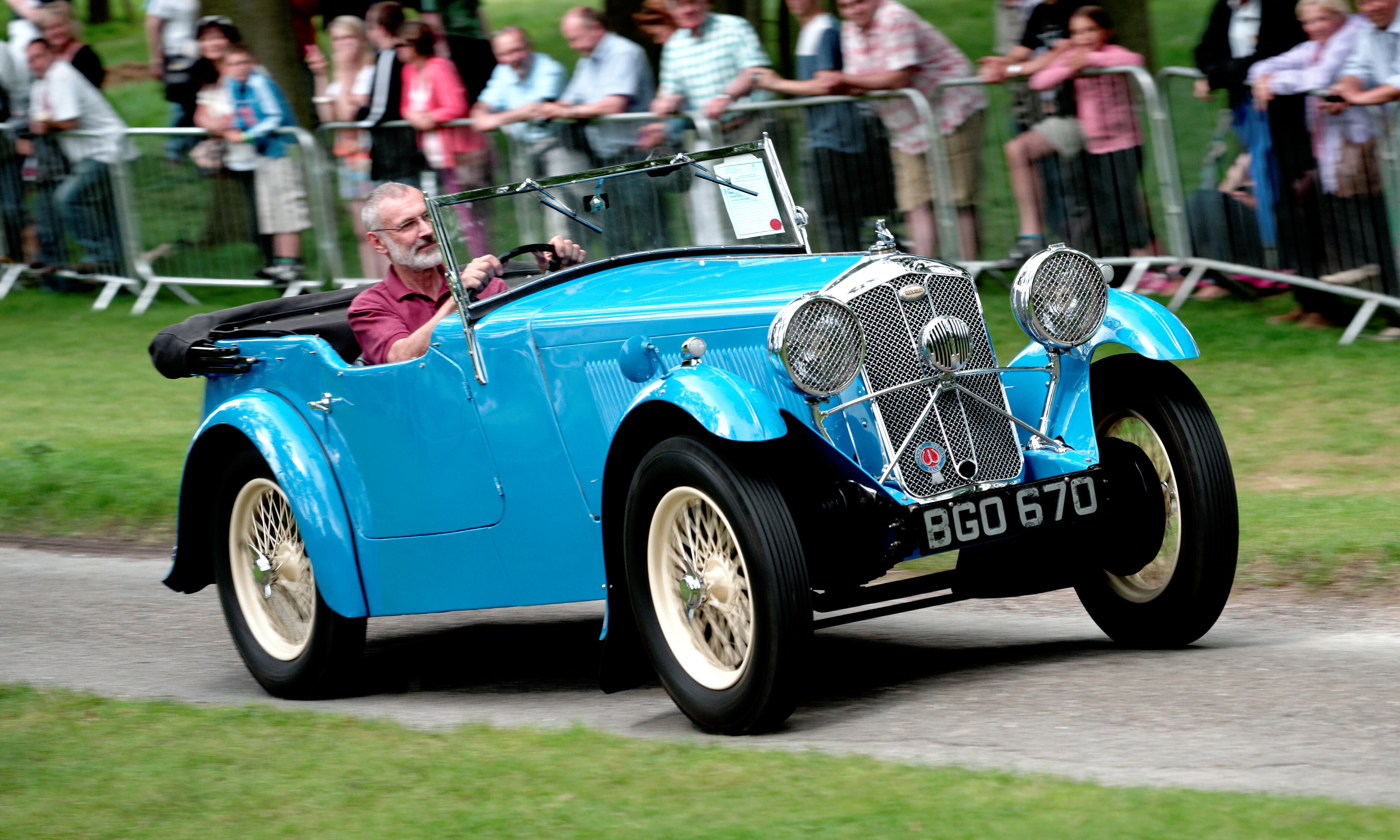
Wolseley Hornet (1930–1936)

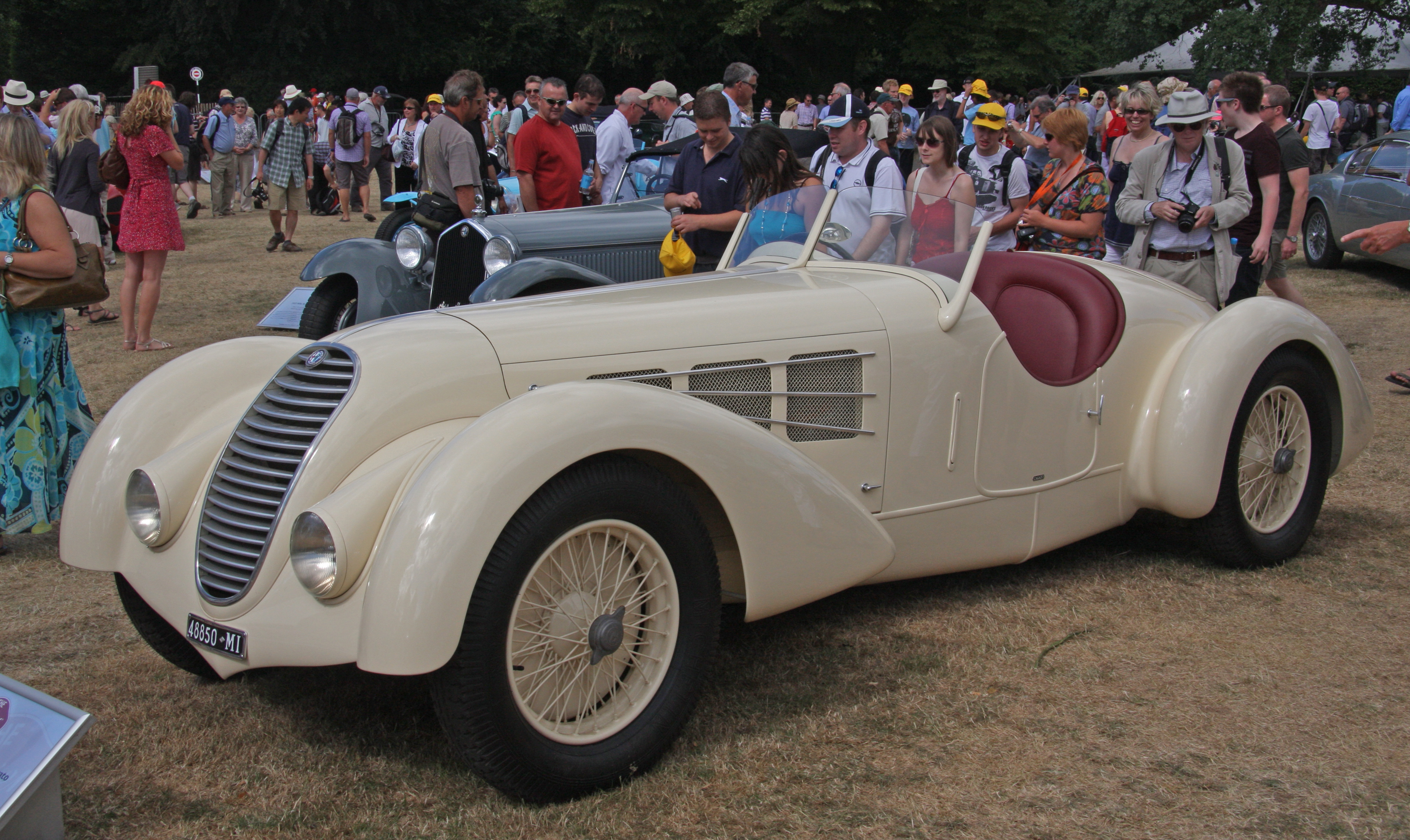
Alfa Romeo 8C (1931–1939)

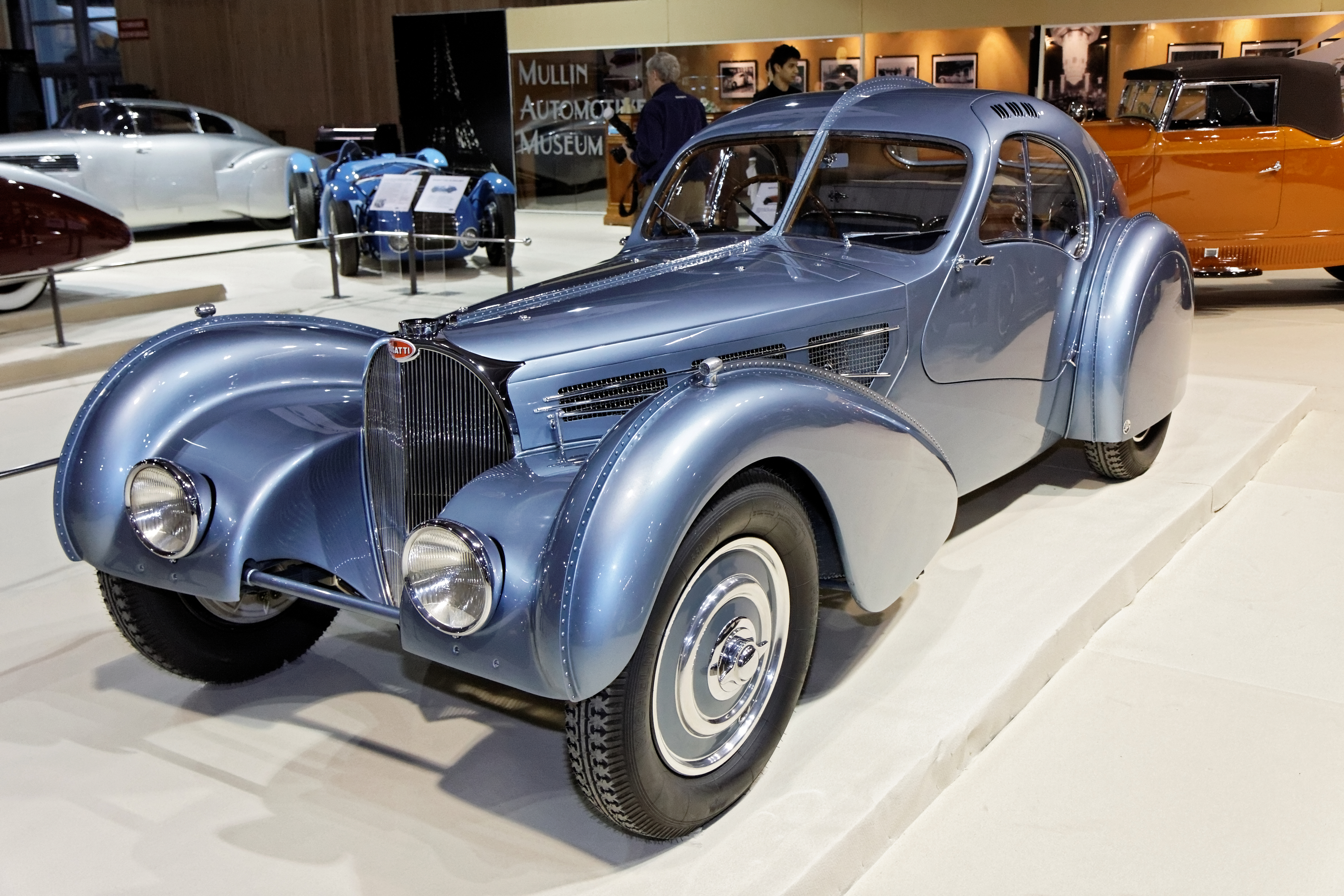
Bugatti Type 57 (1934–1940)

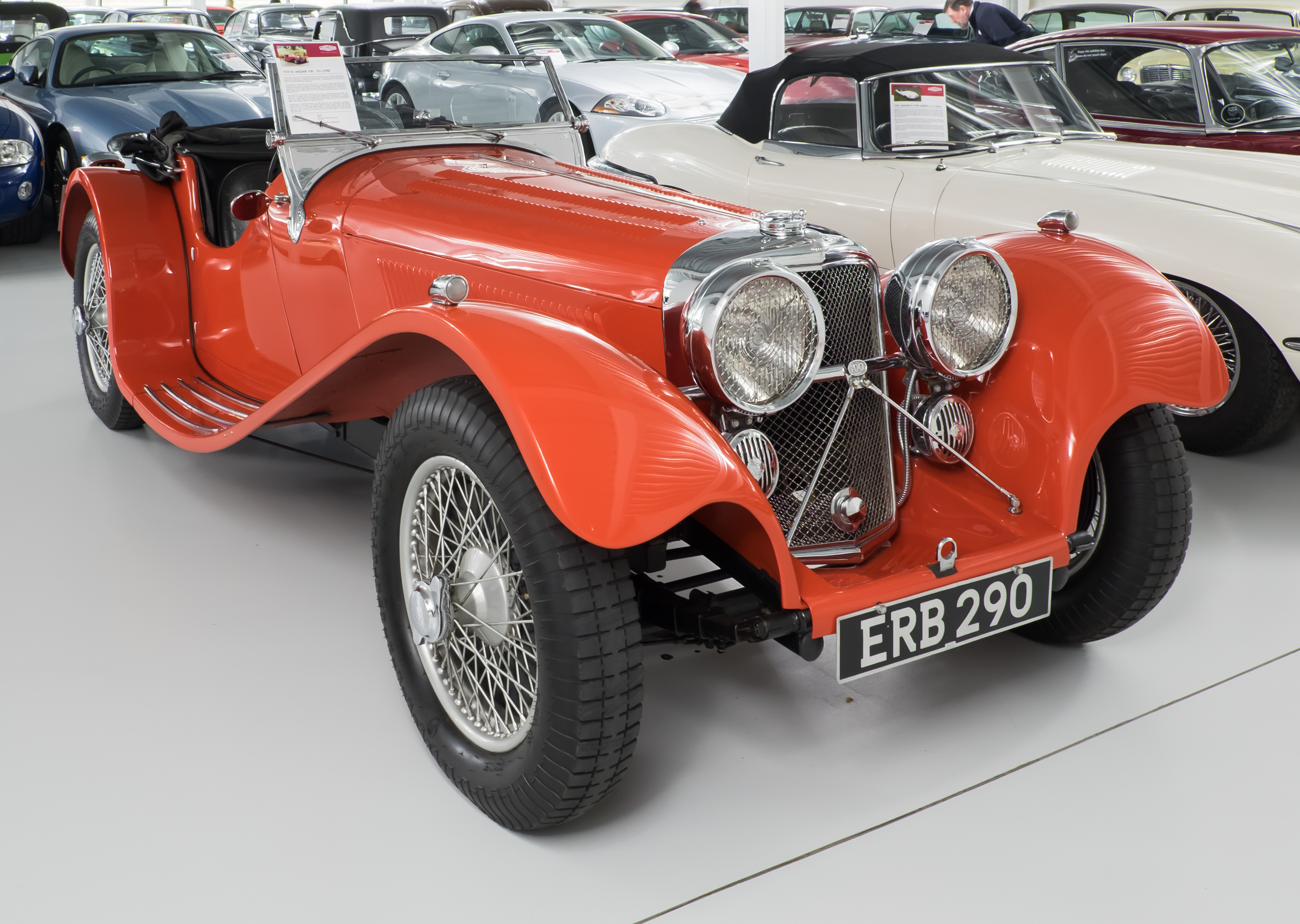
SS Jaguar 100 (1936–1939)

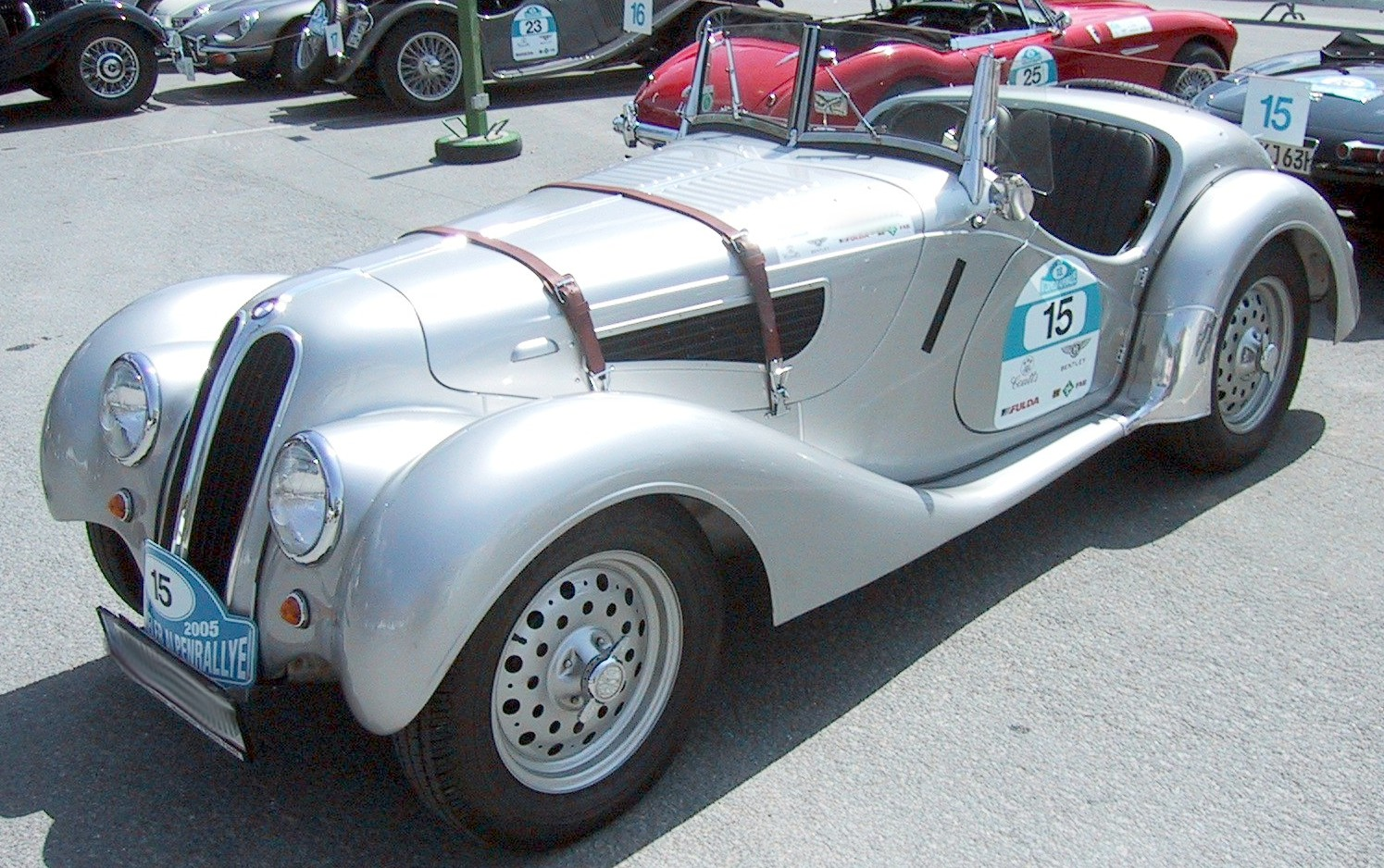
BMW 328 (1936–1940)

=== 1939–1959: Growth following World War II ===
The decade following the Second World War saw an "immense growth of interest in the sports car, but also the most important and diverse technical developments [and] very rapid and genuine improvement in the qualities of every modern production car; assisted by new design and manufacturing techniques a consistently higher level of handling properties has been achieved."

In Italy, a small but wealthy market segment allowed for the manufacture of a limited number of high-performance models directly allied to contemporary Grand Prix machines, such as the 1948 Ferrari 166 S. A new concept altogether was the modern Gran Turismo class from Italy, which was in effect unknown before the war: sustained high-speed motoring from relatively modest engine size and compact closed or berlinetta coachwork. The 1947 Maserati A6 1500 two-seat berlinetta was the first production model from Maserati.

In Germany, the motor industry was devastated by the war, but a small number of manufacturers returned it to prominence. In 1948, the Porsche 356 was released as the debut model from Porsche. The significance of the Porsche 356 and its successors was described in 1957 as "future historians must see them as among the most important of mid-century production cars". The 1954 Mercedes-Benz 300 SL is another significant car from this era.

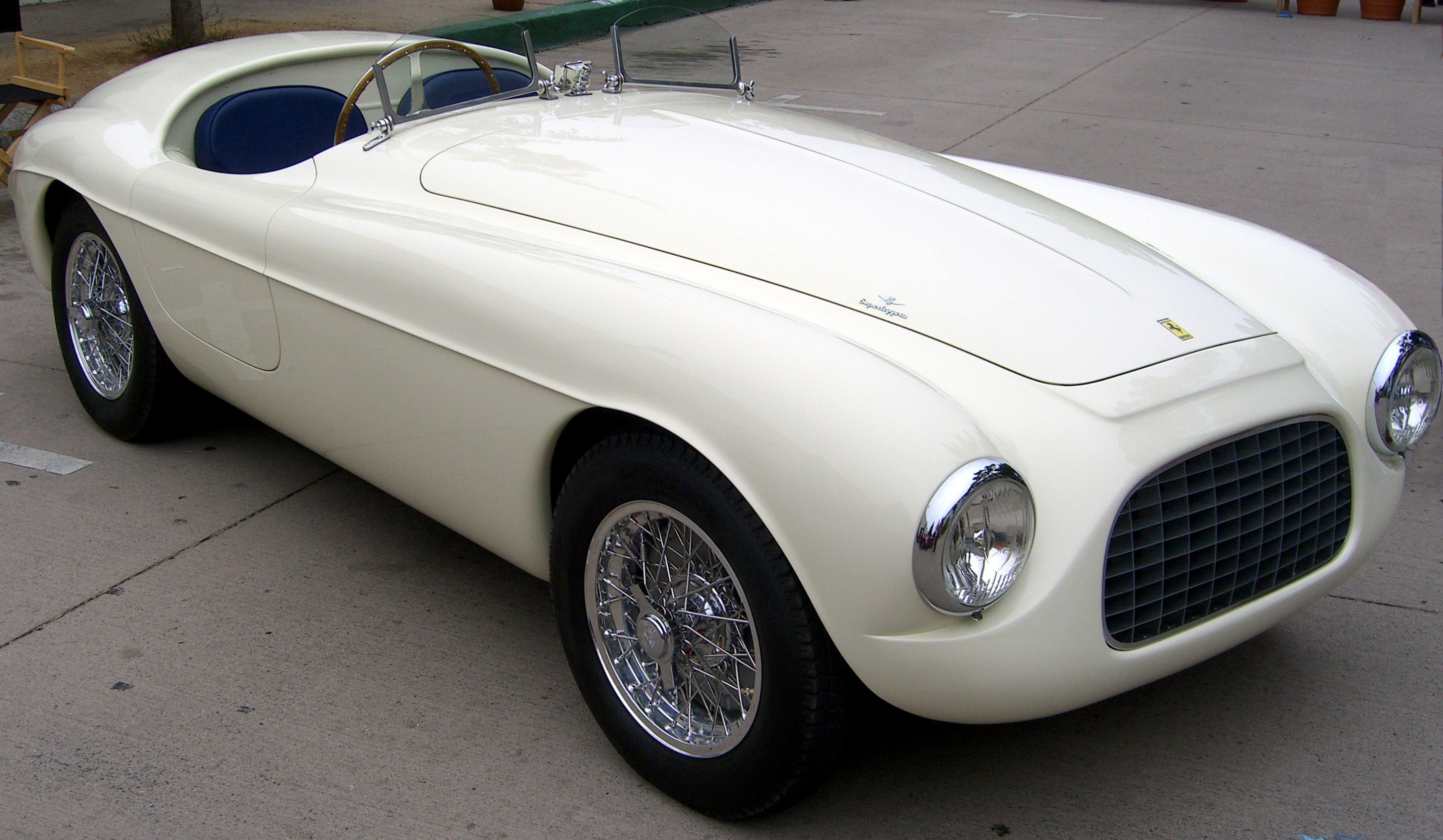
Ferrari 166 Inter Barchetta (1948–1953)

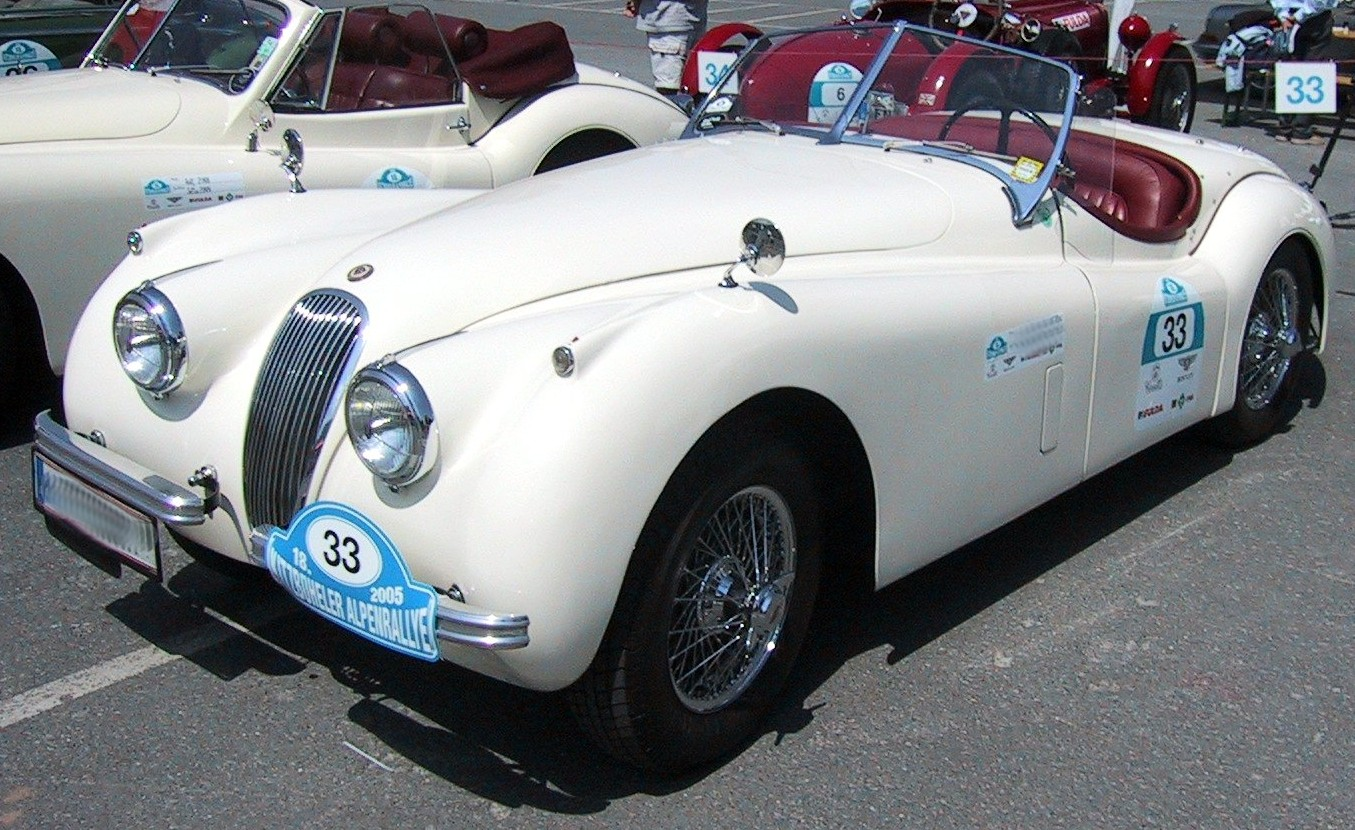
Jaguar XK120 Roadster (1948–1954)

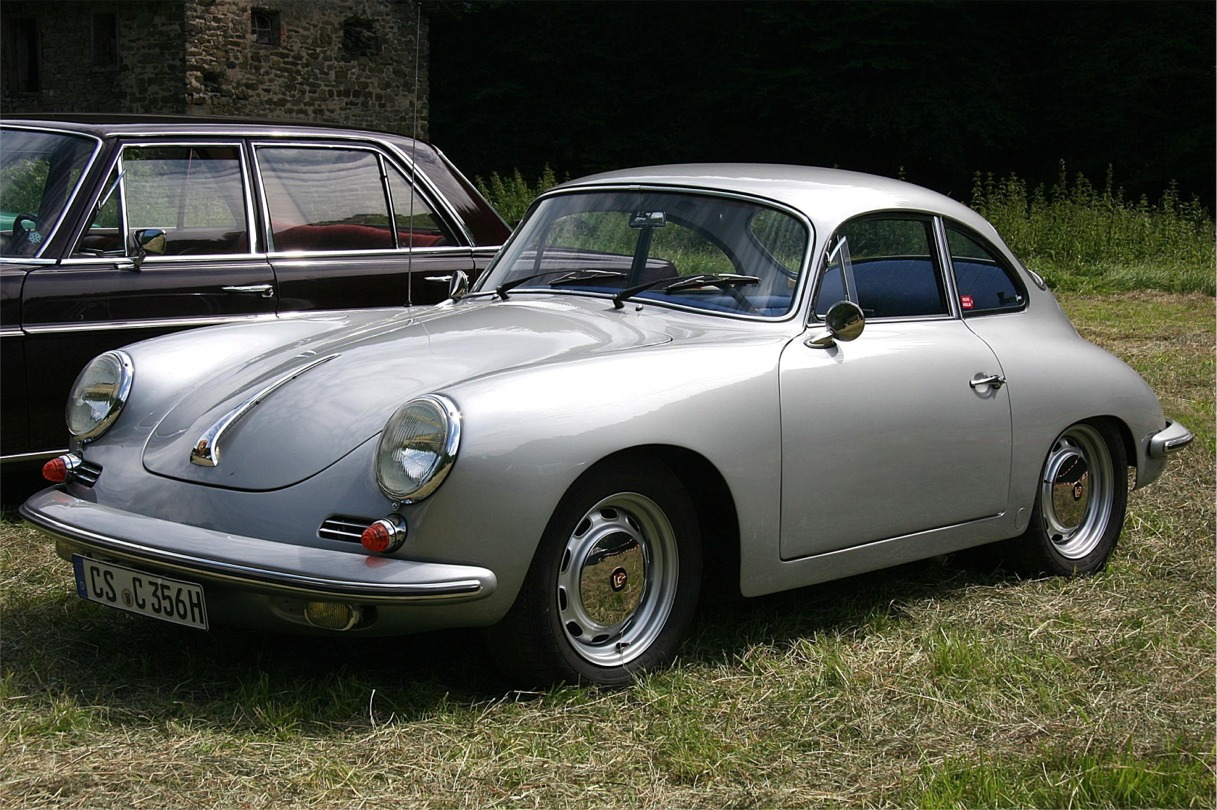
Porsche 356 (1948–1965)

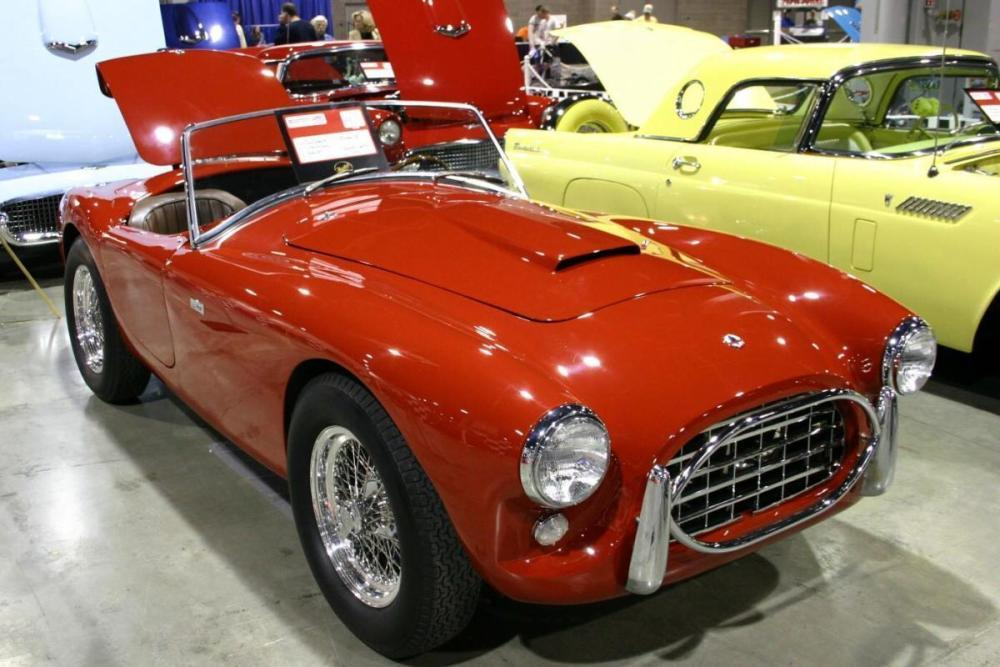
AC Ace (1953–1963)

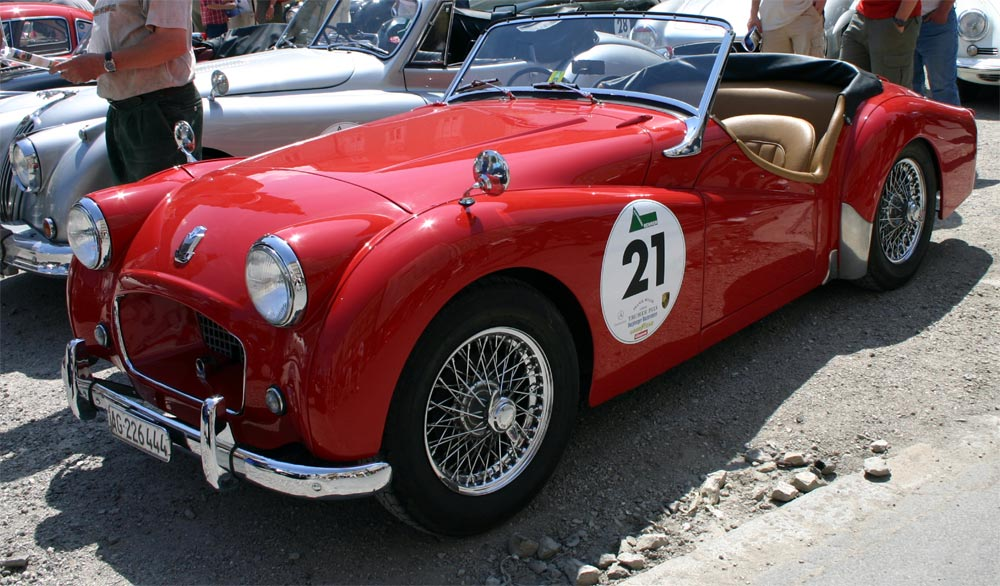
Triumph TR2 (1953–1955)

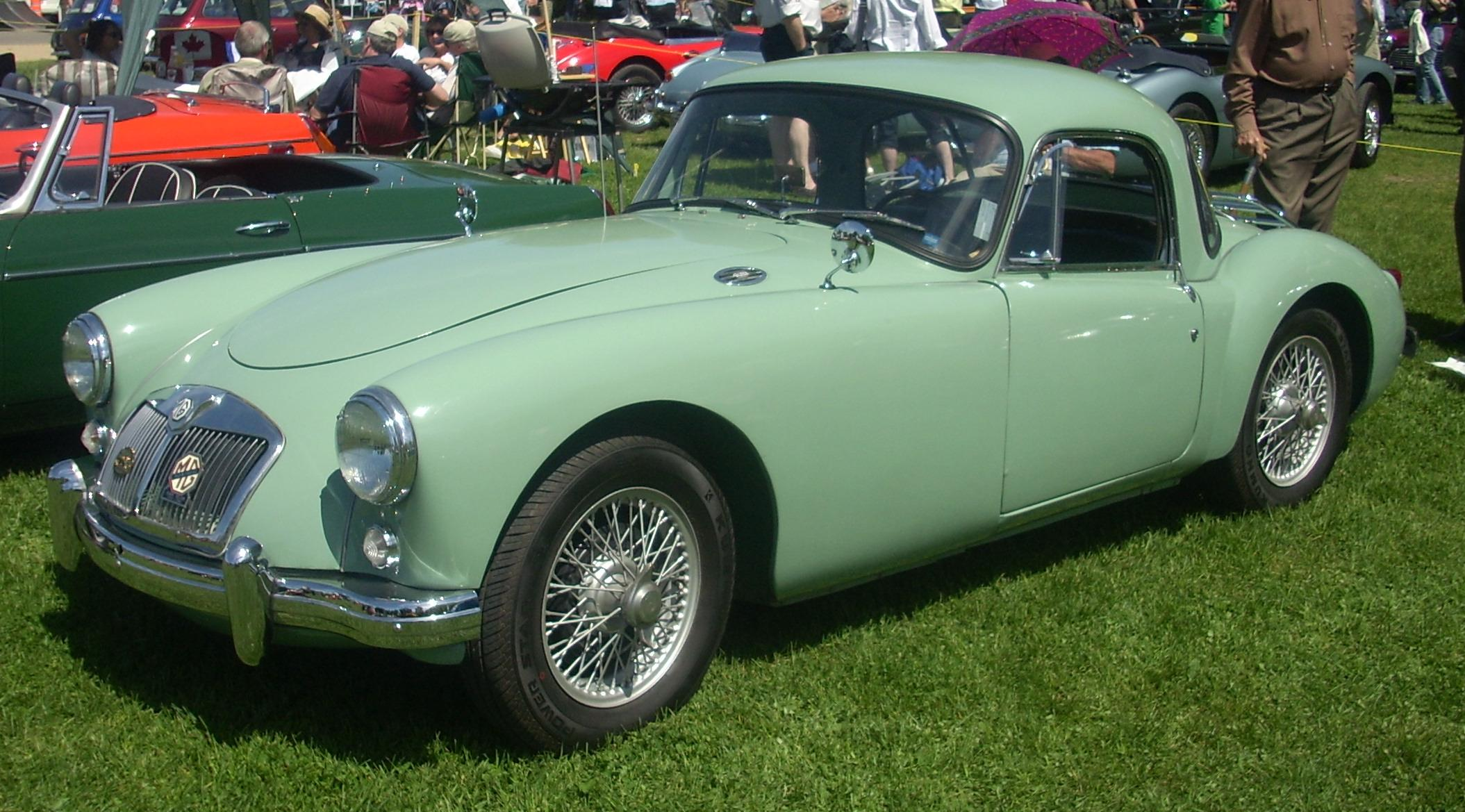
MG MGA (1955–1959)

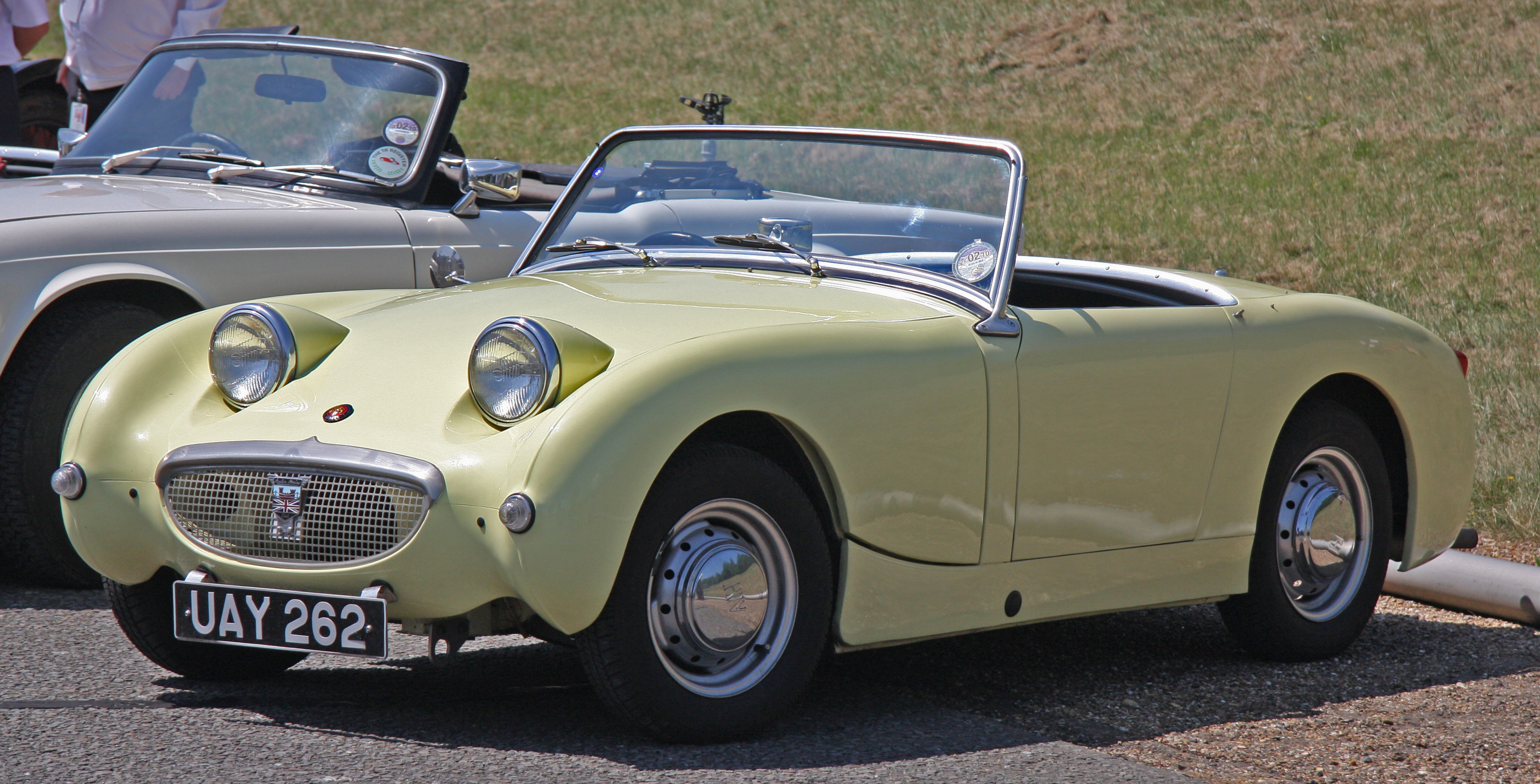
Austin-Healey Sprite (1958–1961)

=== 1960–1979: Lightweight roadsters, mid-engined supercars ===
The 1961 Jaguar E-Type is an iconic sports car of the early 1960s, due to its attractive styling and claimed top speed of 241 km/h (150 mph). The E-type was produced for 14 years and was initially powered by a six-cylinder engine, followed by a V12 engine for the final generation.

In 1962, the MG B introduced a new era of affordable lightweight four-cylinder roadsters. The MG B used a unibody construction and was produced until 1980. Other successful lightweight roadsters include the Triumph Spitfire (1962-1980) and the Alfa Romeo Spider (1966-1993). The Fiat X1/9 (1972-1989) was unusual for its use of a mid-engine design in an affordable roadster model. A late entrant to the affordable roadster market was the 1975 Triumph TR7, however by the late 1970s the demand for this style of car was in decline, resulting in production ceasing in 1982.

The original Lotus Elan (1962-1975) two-seat coupe and roadster models are an early commercial success for the philosophy of achieving performance through minimizing weight and has been rated as one of the top 10 sports cars of the 1960s. The Elan featured fibreglass bodies, a backbone chassis, and overhead camshaft engines.

A different style of roadster was the AC Cobra, released in 1962, which was fitted with V8 engines up to 7.0 L (427 cu in) in size by Shelby.

The Porsche 911 was released in 1964 and has remained in production since. The 911 is notable for its use of the uncommon rear-engine design and the use of a flat-six engine. Another successful rear-engine sports car was the original Alpine A110 (1961-1977), which was a successful rally car during the Group 4 era.

In 1965, the BMW New Class Coupes were released, leading to the BMW 6 Series which remains in production to this day.

The Lamborghini Miura (1966) and Alfa Romeo 33 Stradale (1967) mid-engined high-performance cars are often cited as the first supercars. Other significant European models of the 1960s and 1970s which might be considered supercars today are the Ferrari 250 GTO (1962-1964), Ferrari 250 GT Lusso (1963-1964), Ferrari 275 GTB/4 (1966-1968), Maserati Ghibli (1967-1973), Ferrari Daytona (1968-1973), Dino 246 (1969-1974), De Tomaso Pantera (1971-1993), Ferrari 308 GTB (1975-1980) and BMW M1 (1978-1981).

In 1966, the Jensen FF became the first sports car to use all-wheel drive.

The Ford Capri is a 2+2 coupe that was produced from 1968 to 1986 and intended to be a smaller European equivalent of the Ford Mustang. A main rival to the Capri was Opel Manta, which was produced from 1970 to 1988.

The 1973-1978 Lancia Stratos was a mid-engined two-seat coupe that was powered by a Ferrari V6 engine. This was an unusual arrangement for a car used to compete in rallying, nonetheless it was very successful and won the World Rally Championship in 1974, 1975, and 1976.

The Lancia Montecarlo was produced from 1975 to 1981 and is a mid-engine two-seater, available as a coupé or a targa-top. It was sold as Lancia Scorpion in the USA. Its racing variant, Montecarlo Turbo, won the 1979 World Championship for Makes in its division and overall for 1980 World Championship for Makes and 1981 World Endurance Championship for Makes. Montecarlo also won the 1980 Deutsche Rennsport Meisterschaft and Giro d'Italia automobilistico marathon. The Montecarlo was a basis for the silhouette racing car, Lancia Rally 037.

In the 1970s, turbocharging began to be adopted by sports cars, such as the BMW 2002 Turbo in 1973, the first Porsche 911 Turbo in 1975, and the Saab 99 Turbo in 1978.

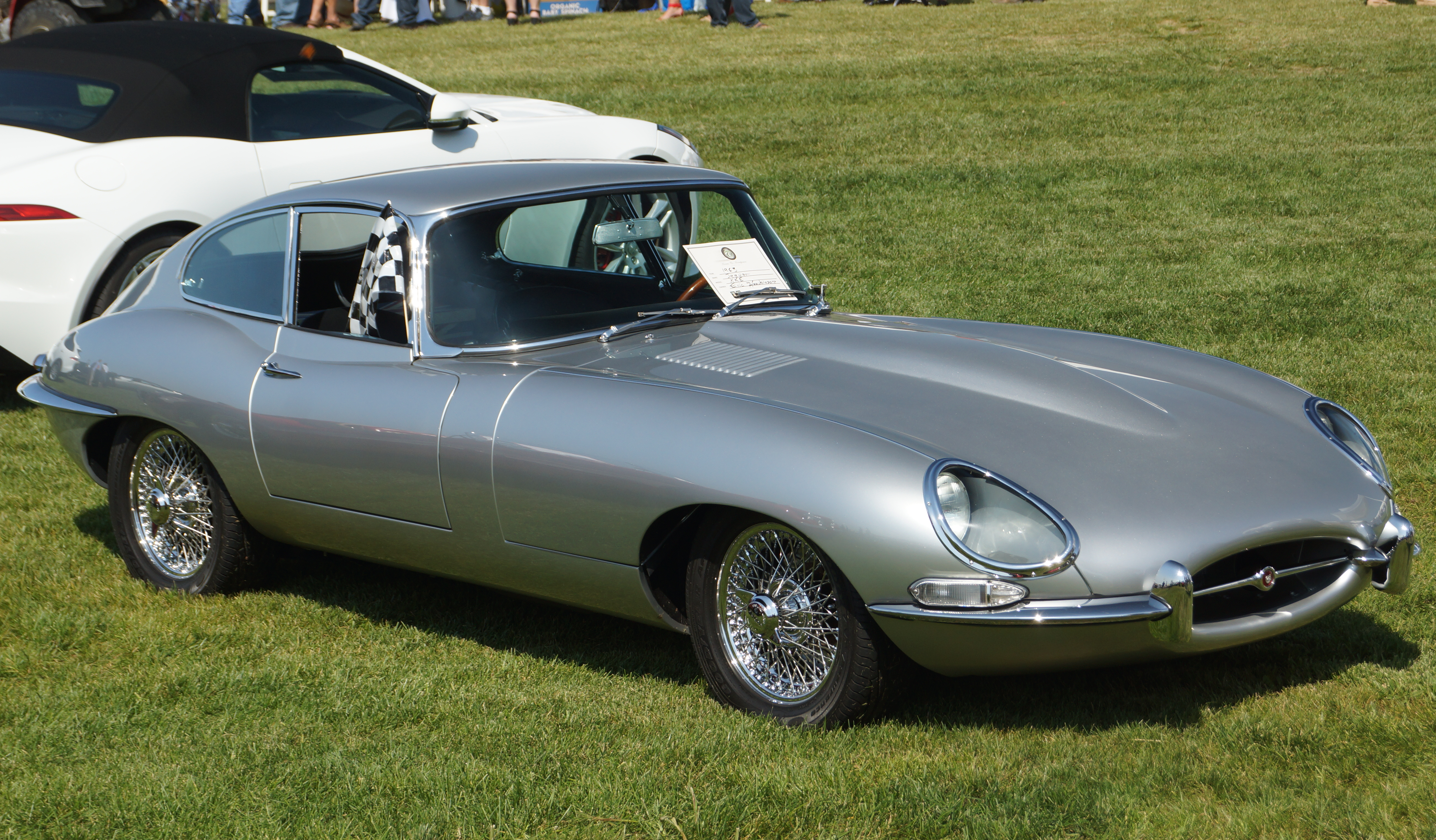
Jaguar E-Type (1961–1974)

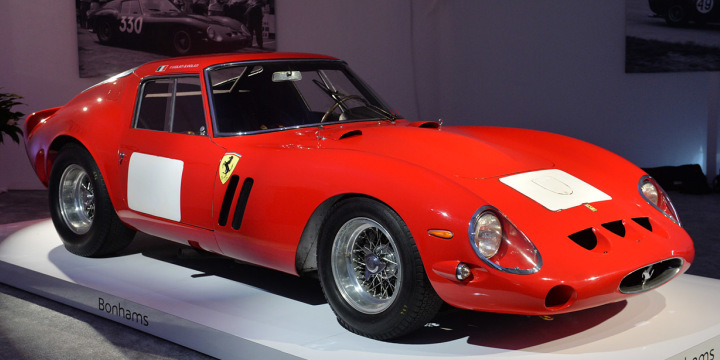
Ferrari 250 GTO (1962–1964)

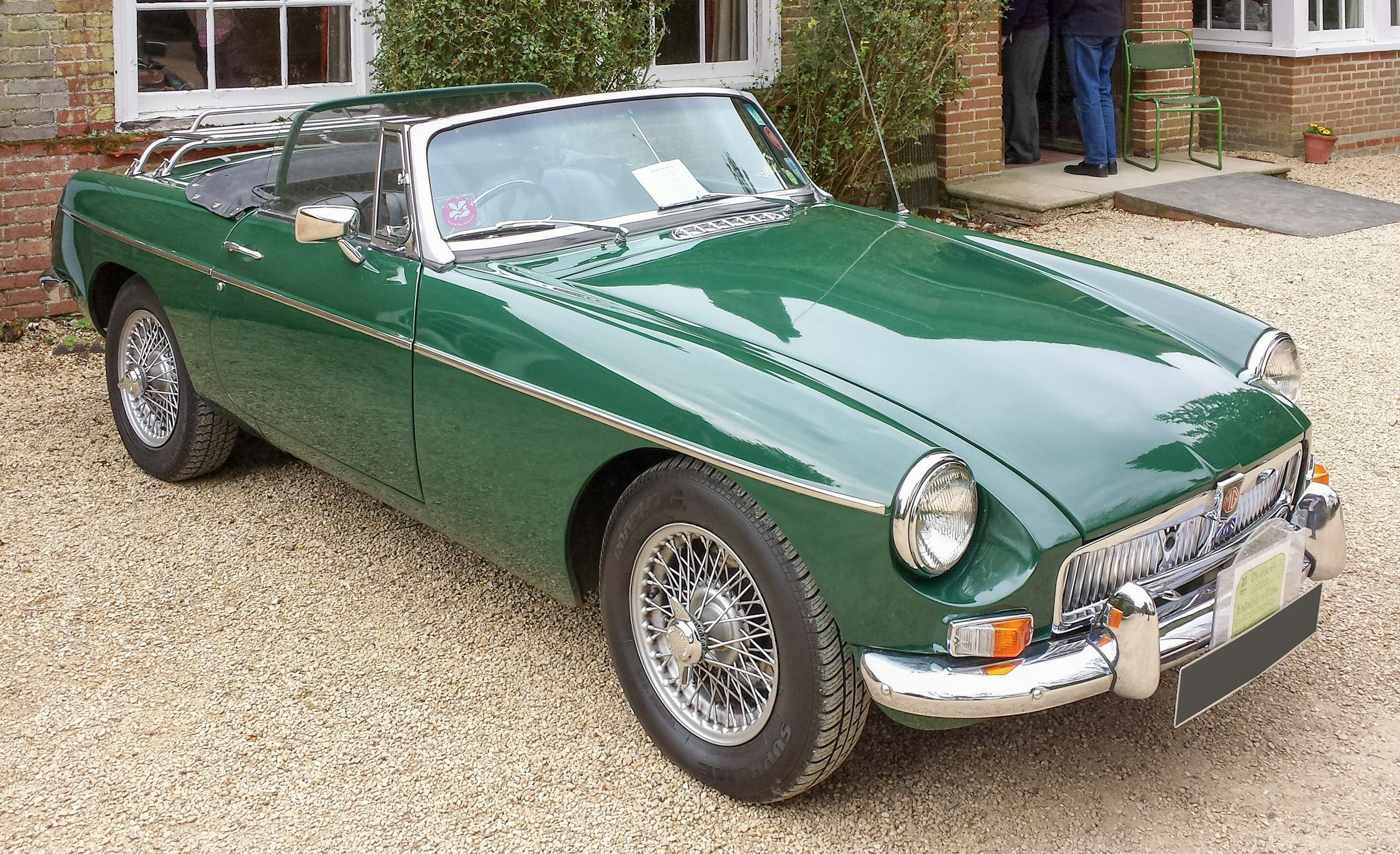
MG MGB (1962–1980)

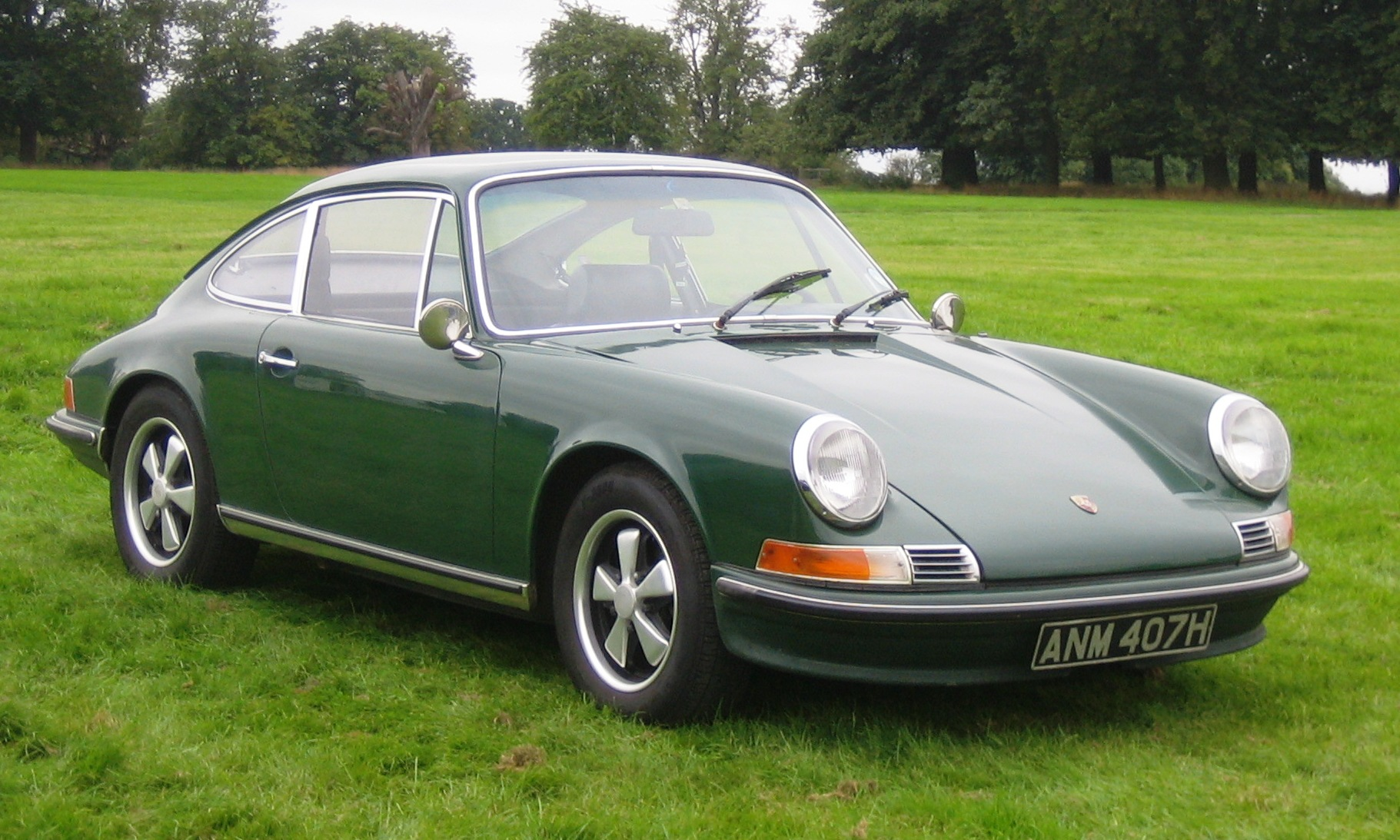
Porsche 911 (1965–present)

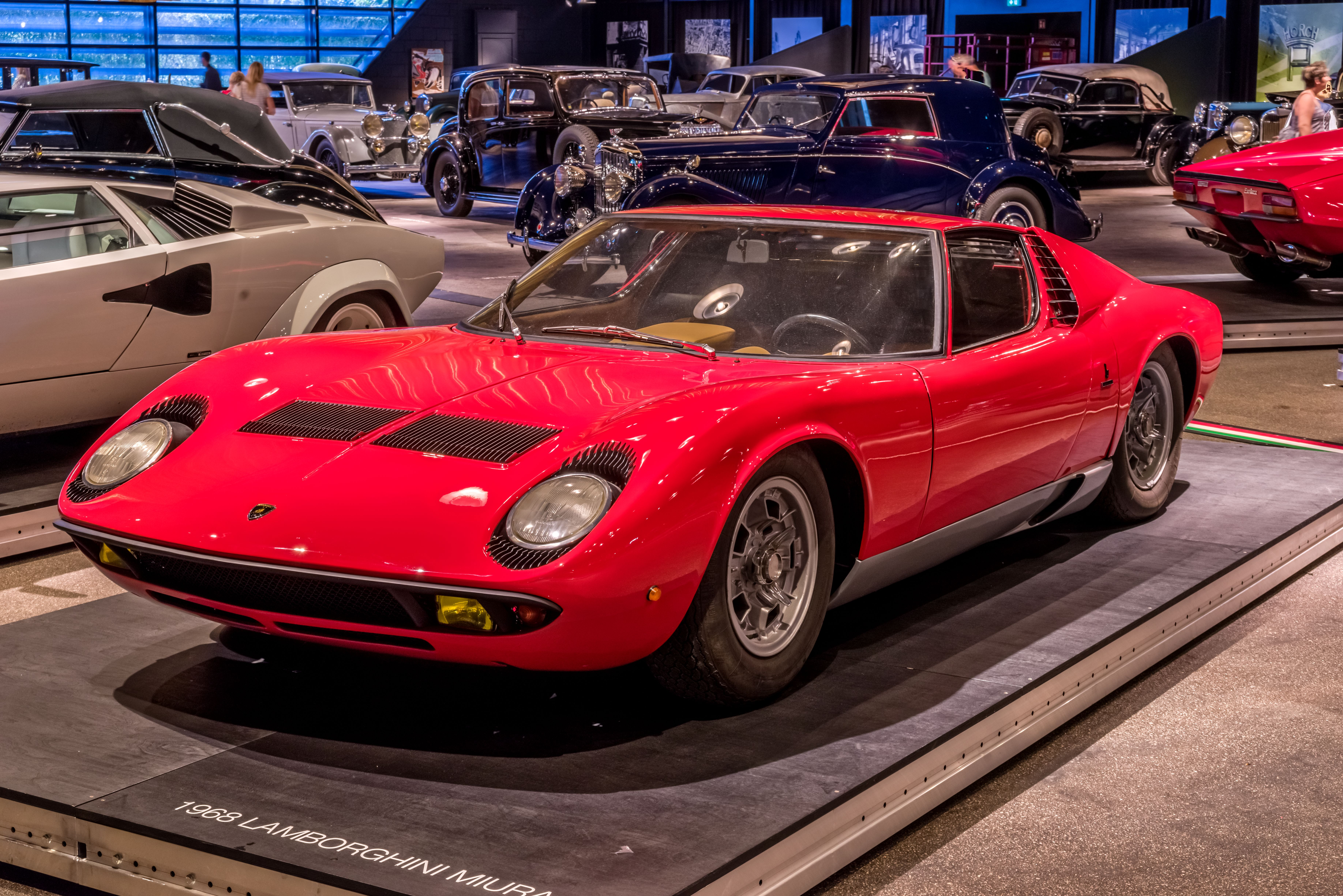
Lamborghini Miura (1966–1973)

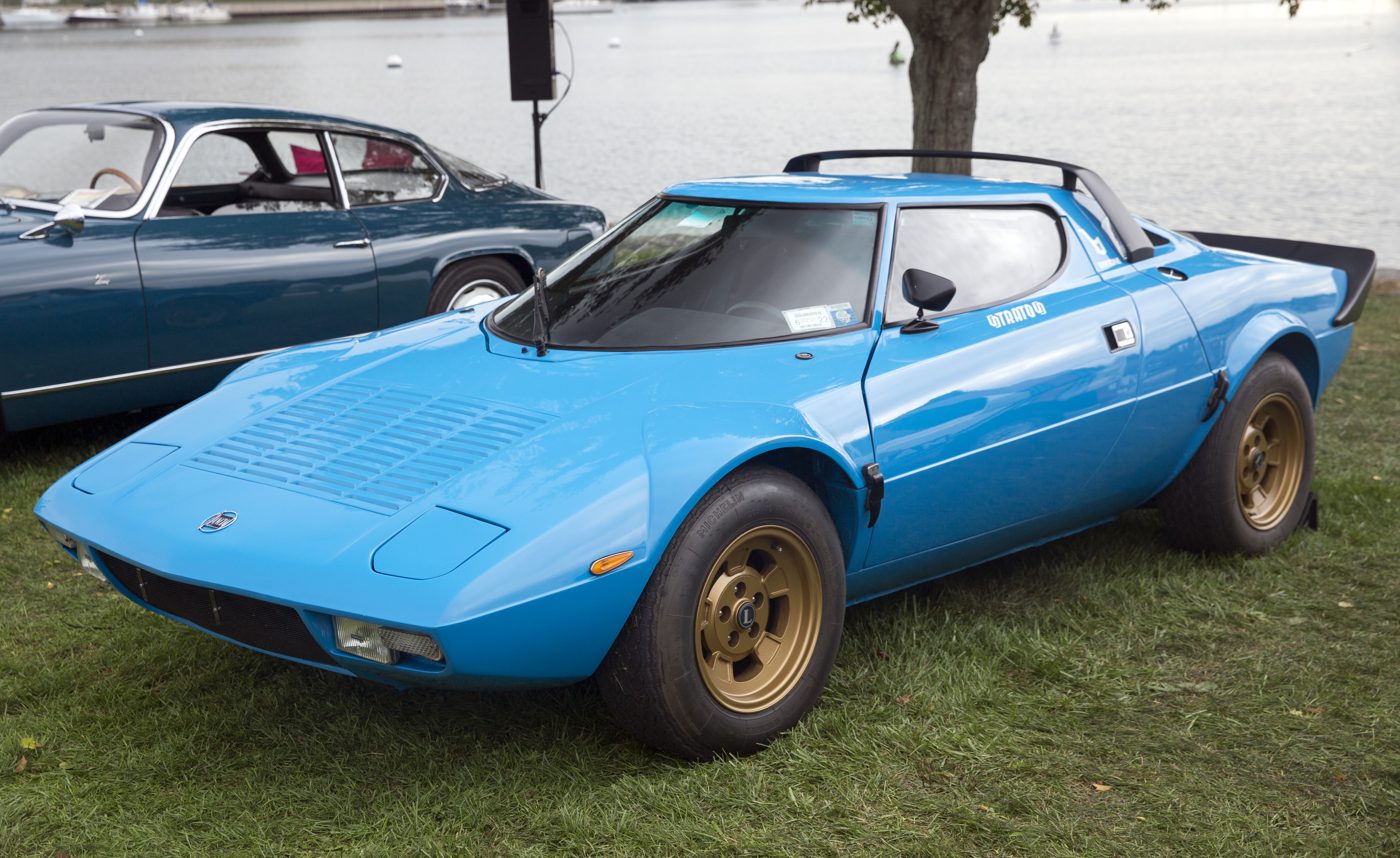
Lancia Stratos (1973–1978)

=== 1980–1999: Turbocharging and all-wheel drive emerge ===
Turbocharging became increasingly popular in the 1980s, from relatively affordable coupes such as the 1980–1986 Renault Fuego and 1992–1996 Rover 220 Coupé Turbo, to expensive supercars such as the 1984-1987 Ferrari 288 GTO and 1987-1992 Ferrari F40.

In the late 1980s and early 1990s, several manufacturers developed supercars that competed for production car top speed records. These cars included the 1986–1993 Porsche 959, 1991–1995 Bugatti EB 110, 1992–1994 Jaguar XJ220 and 1993–98 McLaren F1.

The 1980-1995 Audi Quattro was a pioneering all-wheel drive sports car. The 1995 Porsche 911 Turbo (993) saw the 911 Turbo model switch to all-wheel drive, a drivetrain layout that the model uses to this day.

The BMW M3 was released in 1986 and has been produced for every generation since. The 1993-1996 Mercedes-Benz W124 E36 AMG was the mass-produced AMG model. Audi's equivalent division, called "RS", was launched in 1994 with the Audi RS 2 Avant.

Ford Europe withdrew from the sports car market at the end of 1986 when the Capri was discontinued after a production run of nearly two decades. There was no direct successor, as Ford was concentrating on higher-performance versions of its hatchback and saloon models at the time.

In 1989, a new generation of Lotus Elan roadster was released which used a front-wheel drive layout, a controversial choice for a "purist" sports car. The Elan sold poorly and was discontinued after three years. The 1996 Lotus Elise, a mid-engined, rear-wheel drive roadster, was much more successful and remained in production until 2021.

Roadsters enjoyed a resurgence in the mid-1990s, including the 1989-present Mazda MX-5, the 1995-2002 BMW Z3 (succeeded by the 2002-2016 BMW Z4), the 1995-2002 MG F, the 1996–present Porsche Boxster and the 1998–2023 Audi TT.

The Honda S2000 roadster was introduced in 1999 for the 2000 model year and was noted for its high-revving 4-cylinder engine and its exceptionally high specific output of 125 horsepower per litre.

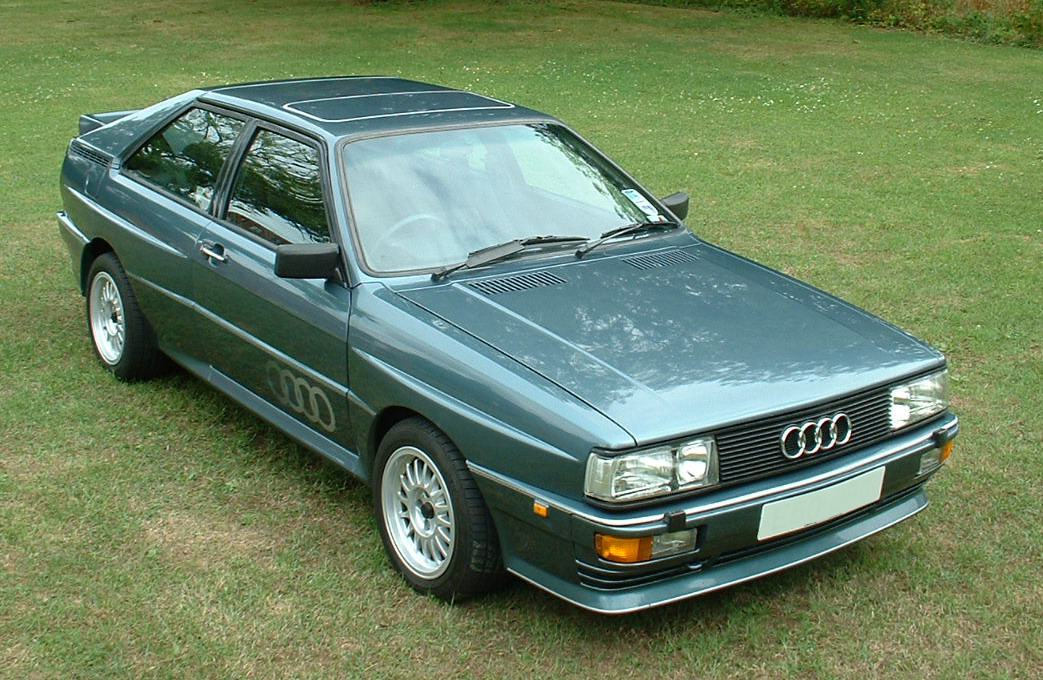
Audi Quattro (1980–1991)

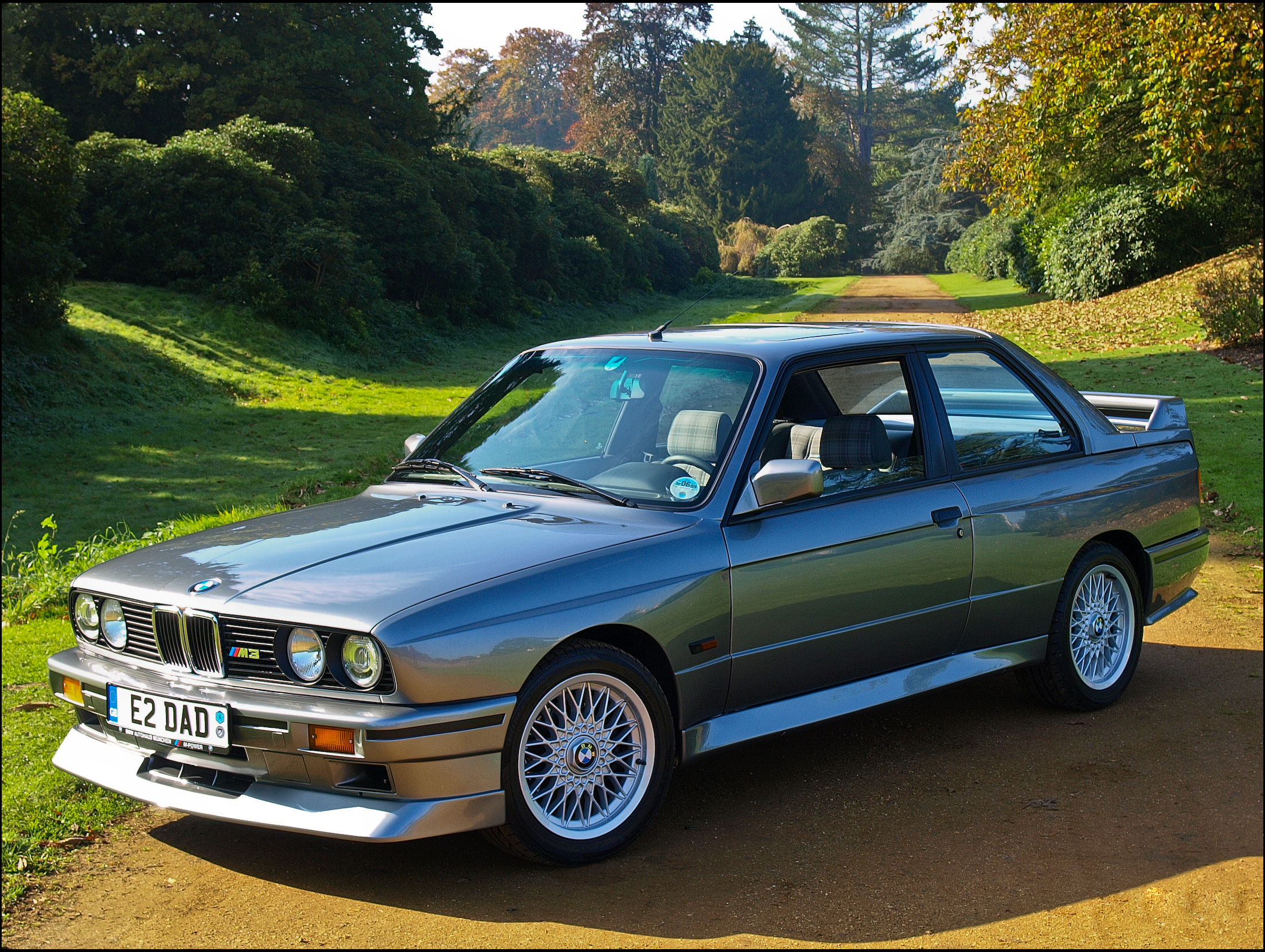
BMW M3 (E30) (1986–1991)

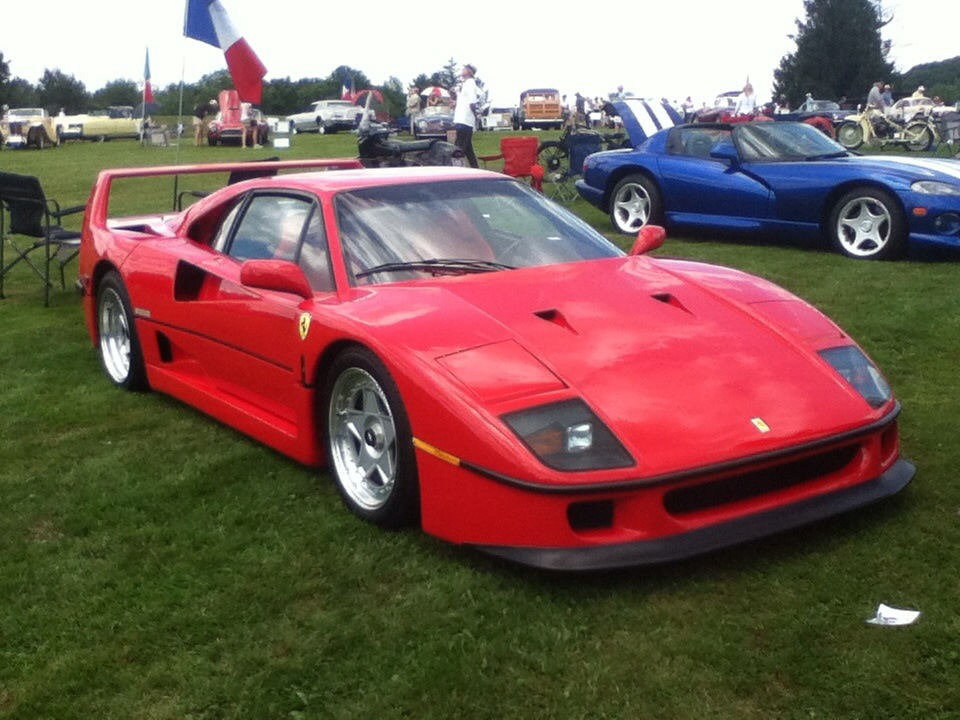
Ferrari F40 (1987–1992)

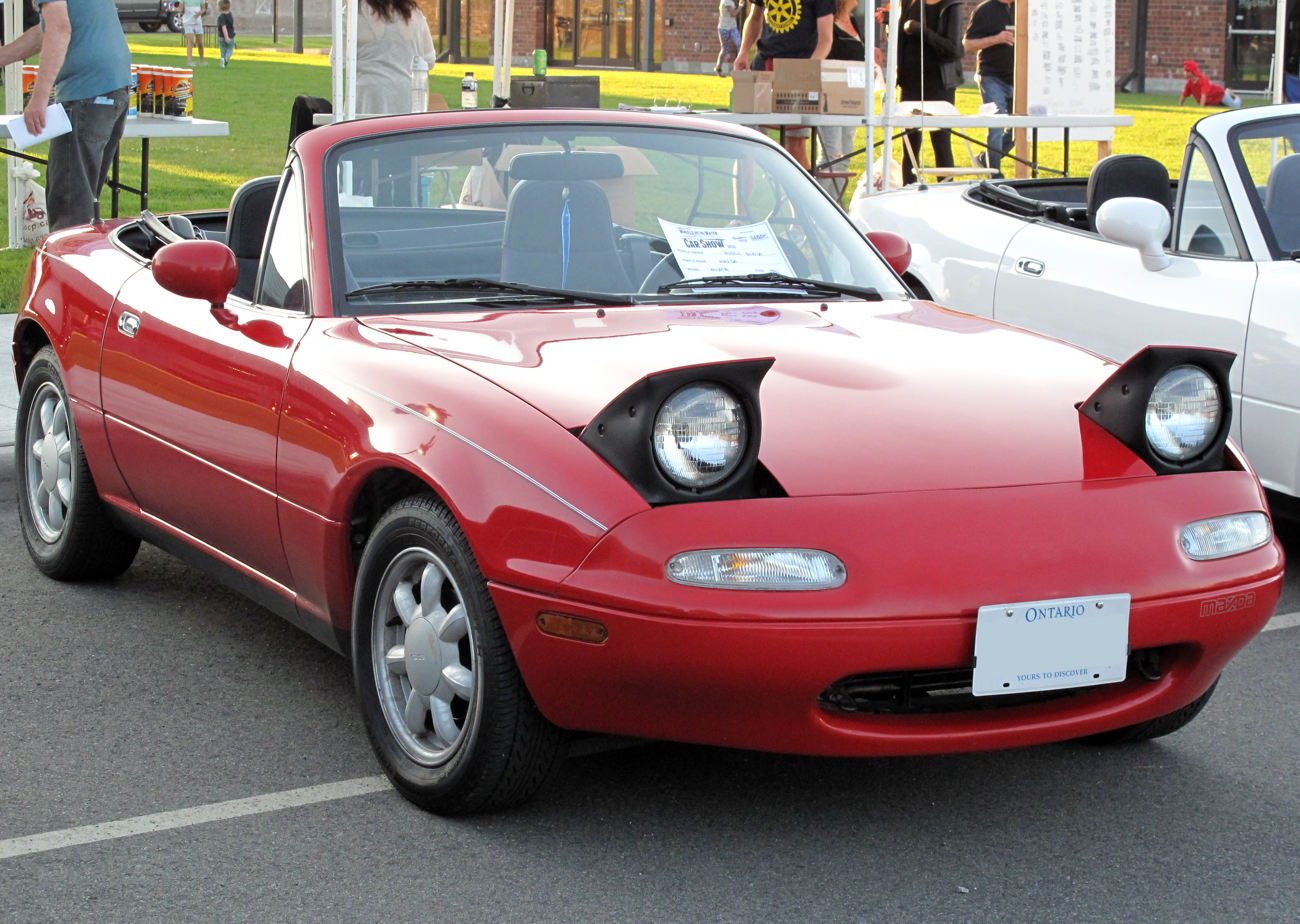
Mazda MX-5 (NA) (1989–1997)

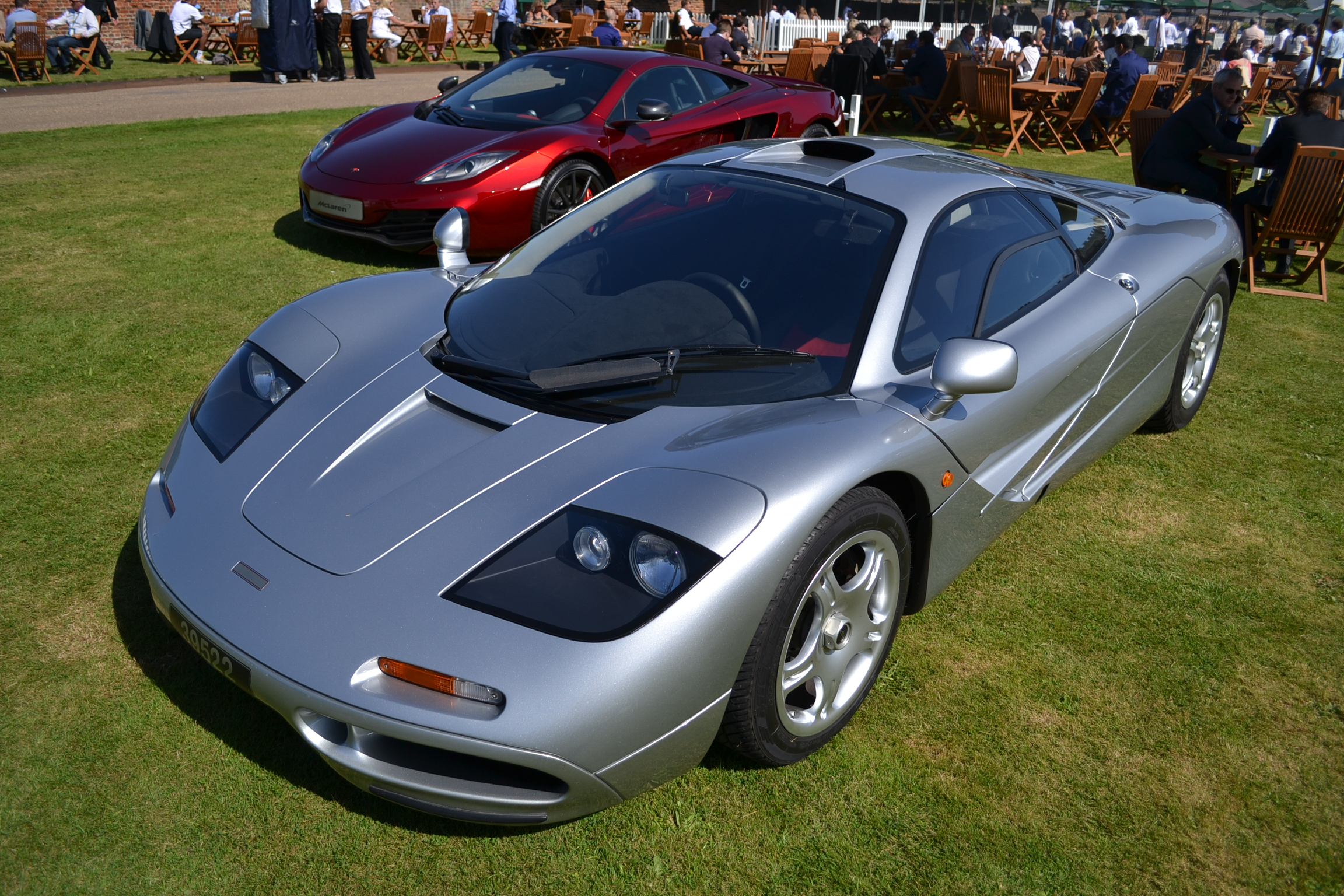
McLaren F1 (1993–1998)

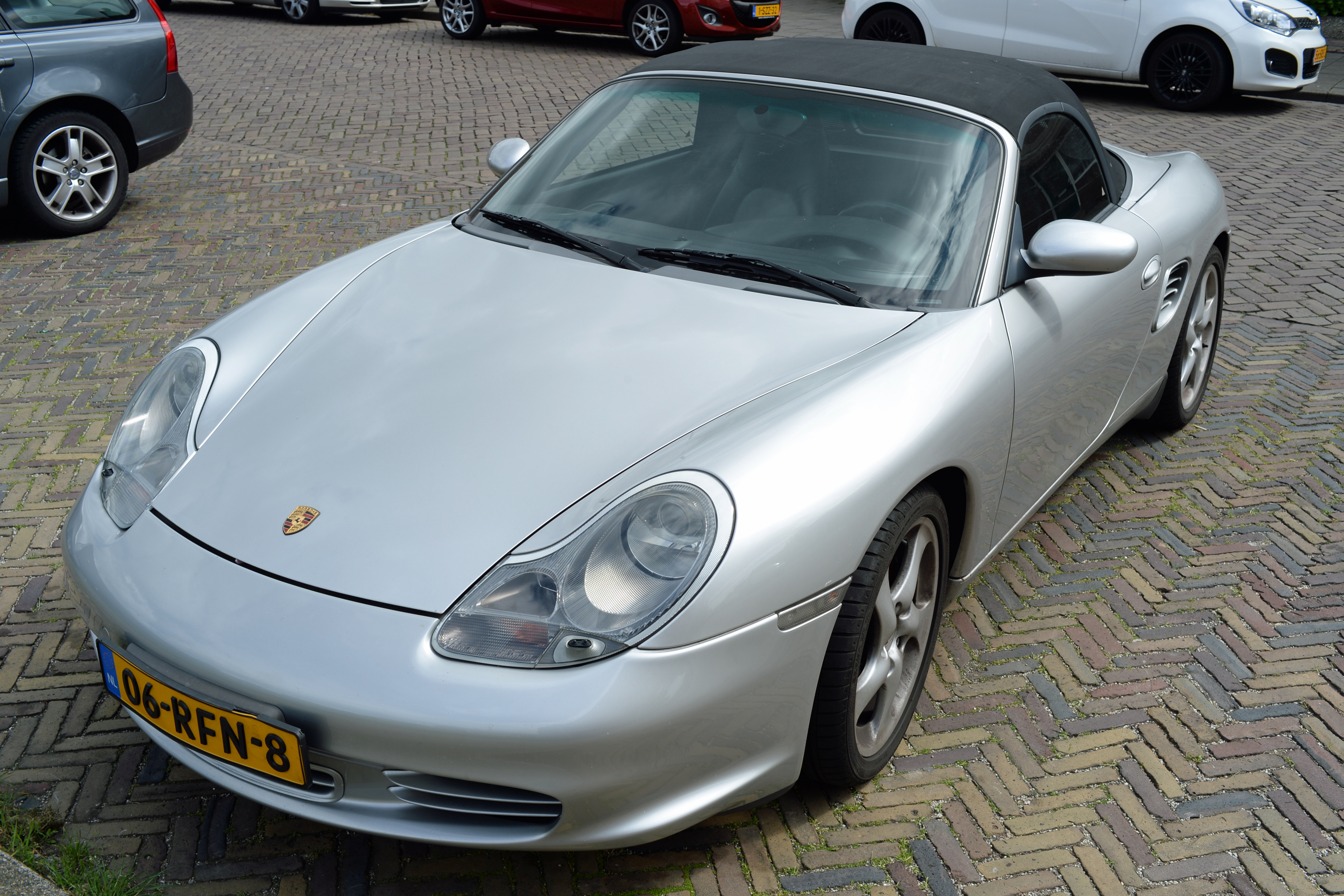
Porsche Boxster (986) (1996–2004)

=== 2000–present: turbos become dominant, hybrids emerge ===
The 2000–2021 Lotus Exige was introduced as a coupe version of Elise. Similarly, Porsche Cayman (987) was introduced in 2006 as the coupe equivalent to the Porsche Boxster roadster. Lotus also expanded its model range with the 2009–2021 Lotus Evora, a larger four-seat coupe.

Audi's first mid-engined sports car was the 2006–2024 Audi R8. Other sports cars of the 2000s were the 2005-2010 Alfa Romeo Brera/Spider, 2009-2015 Peugeot RCZ, and the 2008-2017 reintroduction of the Volkswagen Scirocco (a coupe based on the VW Golf platform).

Reflecting overall car industry trends, the mid-2010s saw naturally aspirated engines being replaced by turbocharged engines. Ferrari's first regular production turbocharged engine was used in the 2014-2017 Ferrari California T, followed by the 2015-2019 Ferrari 488. Similarly, in 2016, the Porsche 911 (991.2) began to use turbocharging on all models and the Porsche 982 Cayman/Boxster downsized from a six-cylinder engine to a turbocharged four-cylinder engine.

Also in the 2010s, dual-clutch transmissions became more widespread, causing manual transmissions to decline in sales and no longer be offered on some models.

Hybrid-electric sports cars began to appear in the 2010s— notably the 2013-2016 LaFerrari, 2013-2015 McLaren P1, 2013-2015 Porsche 918 Spyder "hypercars". The 2014–2020 BMW i8 was also an early plug-in hybrid sports car.

McLaren began permanent car manufacturing operations with the 2011-2014 McLaren 12C.

In 2013, the Jaguar F-Type saw the brand return to the two-seat sports car market, with the four-seat grand tourer Jaguar XK discontinued the following year.

The BMW 2 Series coupe and convertible were introduced in 2013 to sit below the larger BMW 4 Series models, with the new BMW M2 high-performance model introduced in 2015.

The 2013–present Alfa Romeo 4C two-seat coupe and roadster used a carbon-fibre body and became Alfa's first mid-engine sports car since the 1967-1969 Alfa Romeo 33 Stradale.

Fiat had exited the roadster market with the end of Fiat Barchetta production in 2005. The company resumed production of roadsters in 2016 with the Fiat 124 Spider, which is based on the Mazda MX-5.

In 2017, Renault revived the Alpine brand for the 2017–present Alpine A110 mid-engine coupe.

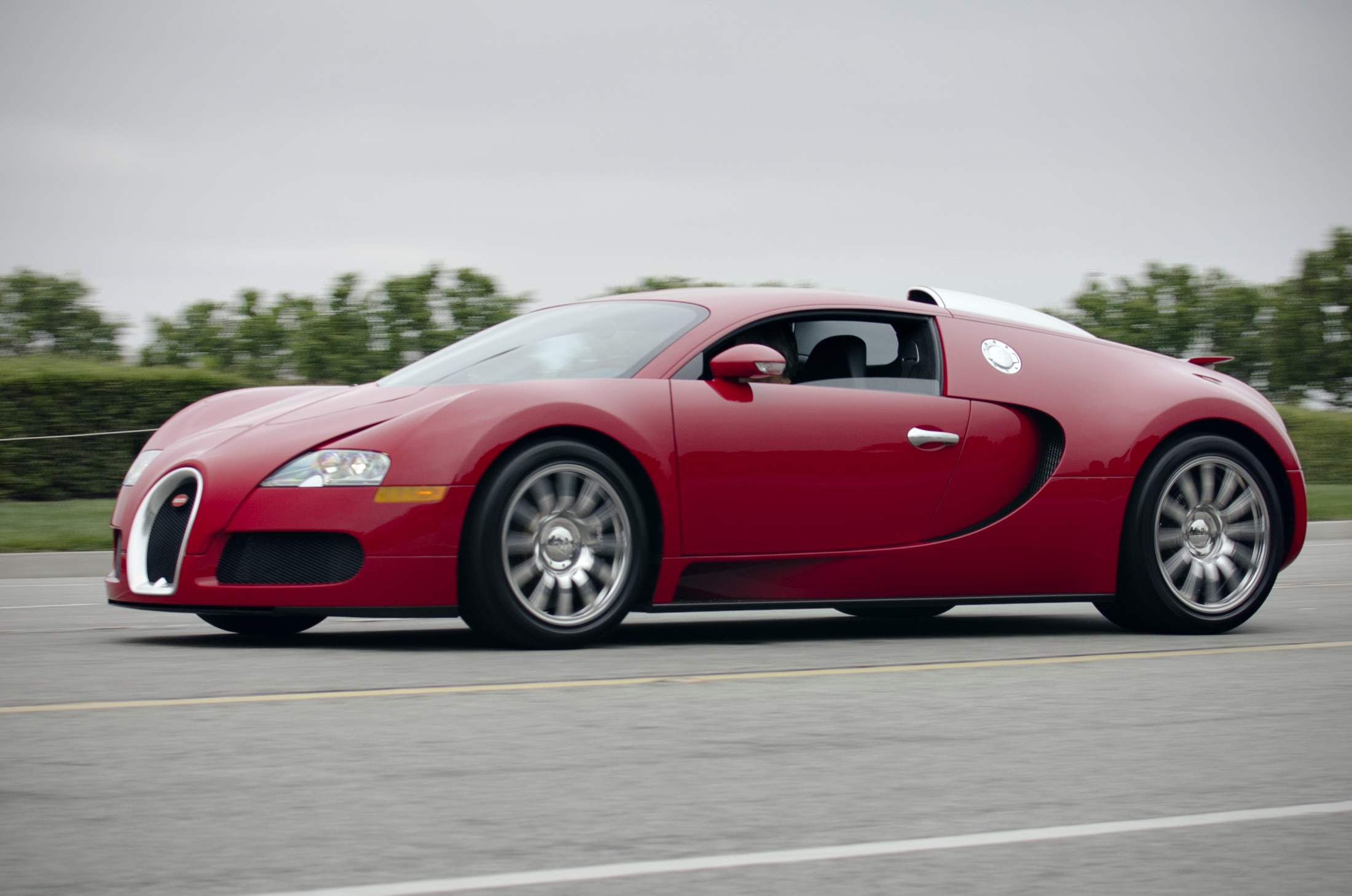
Bugatti Veyron (2005–2015)

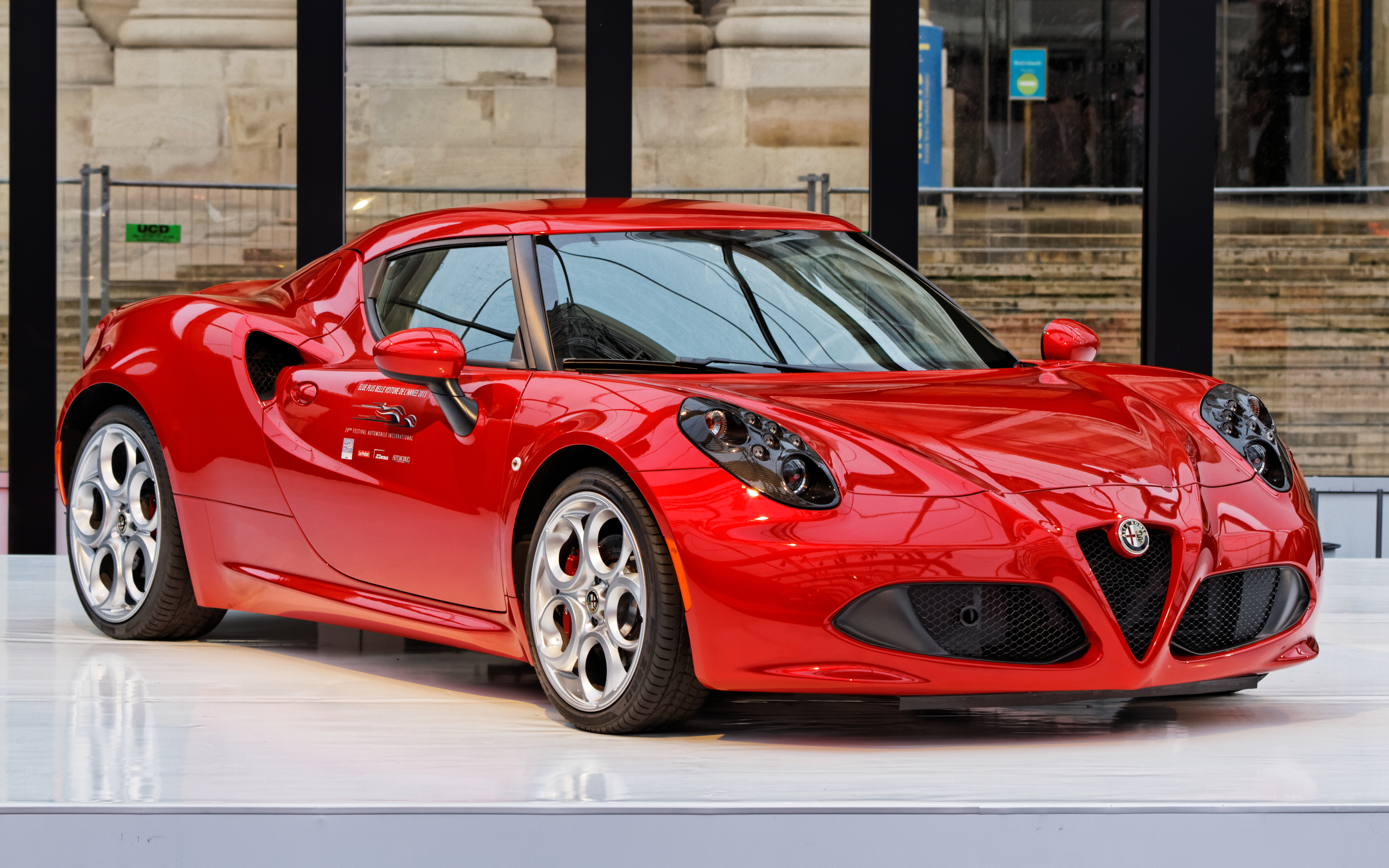
Alfa Romeo 4C (2013–2018)

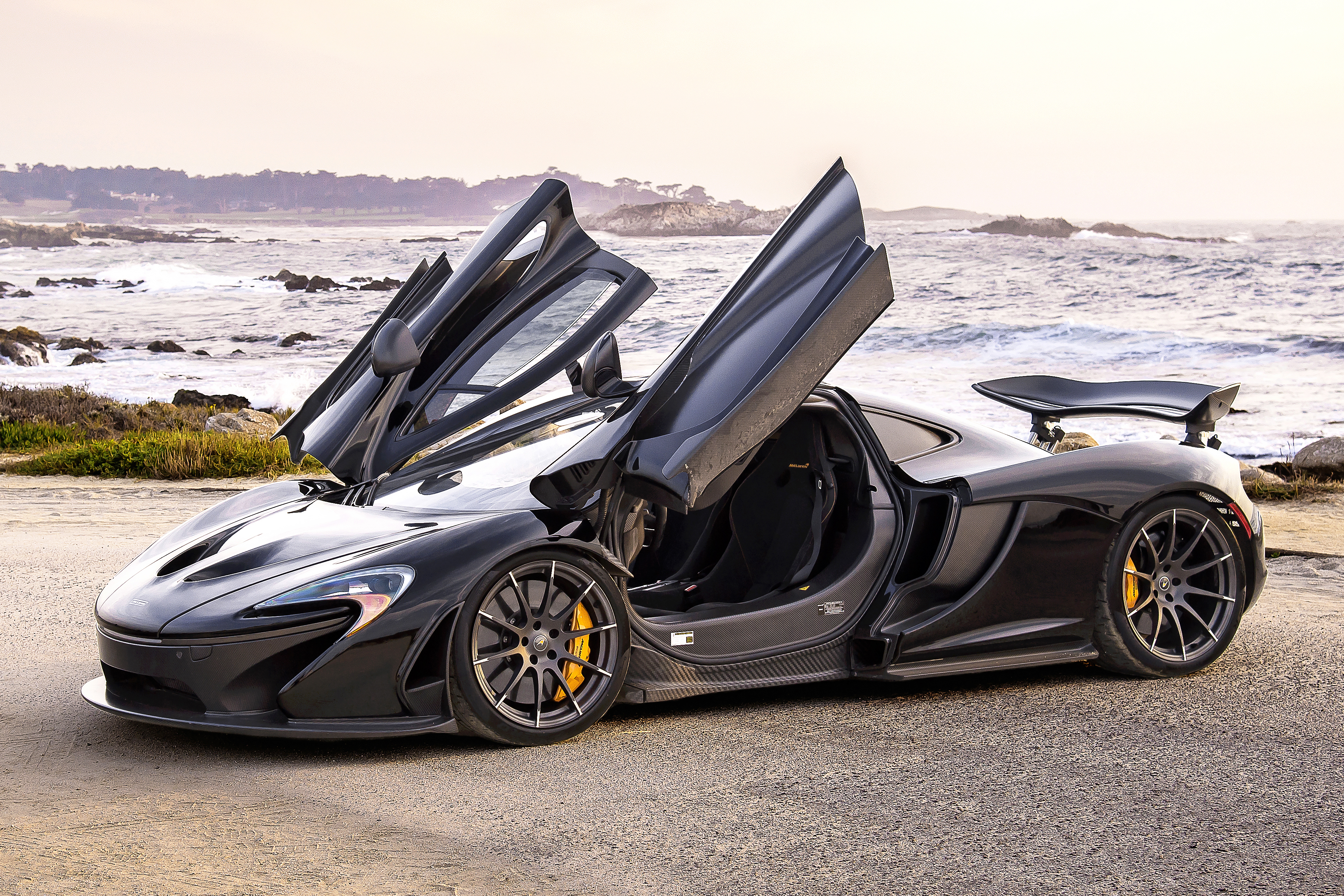
McLaren P1 (2013–2015)

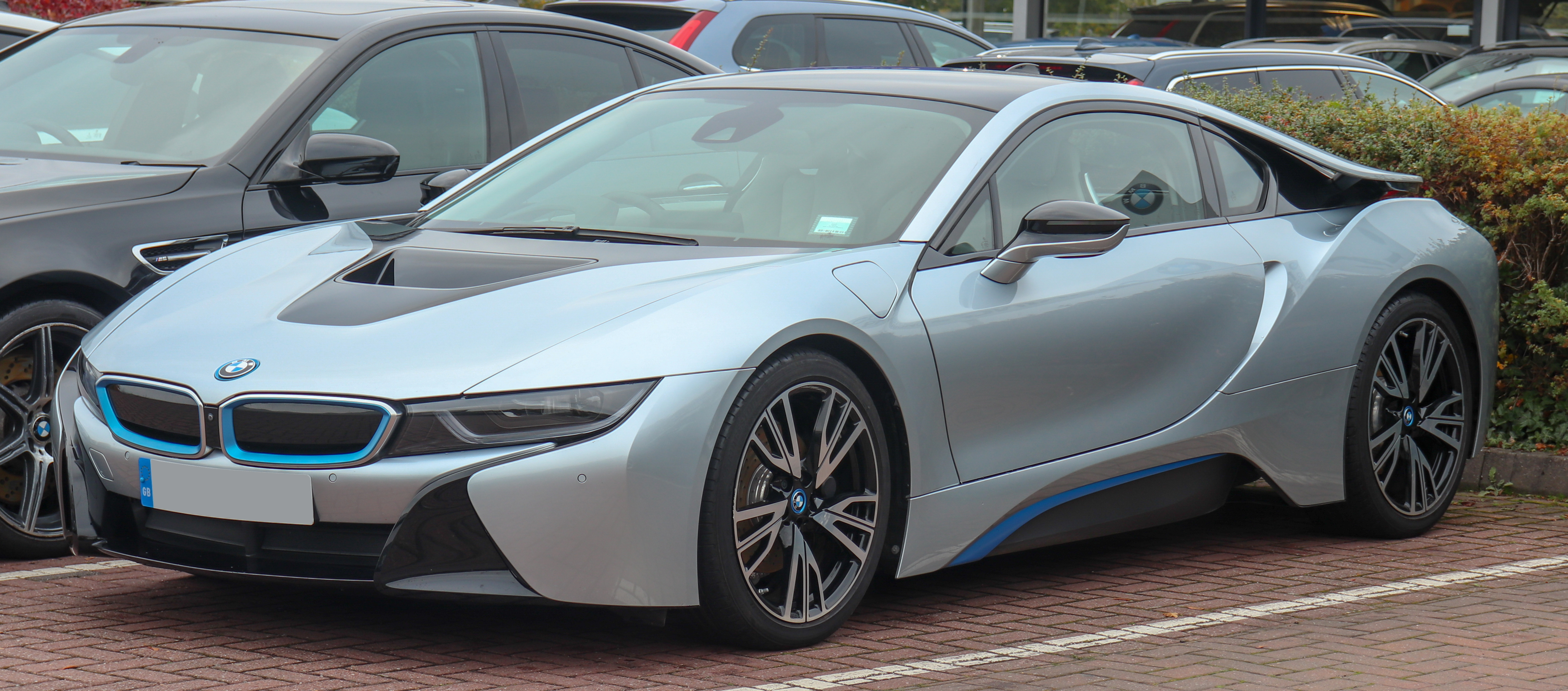
BMW i8 (2014–2020)

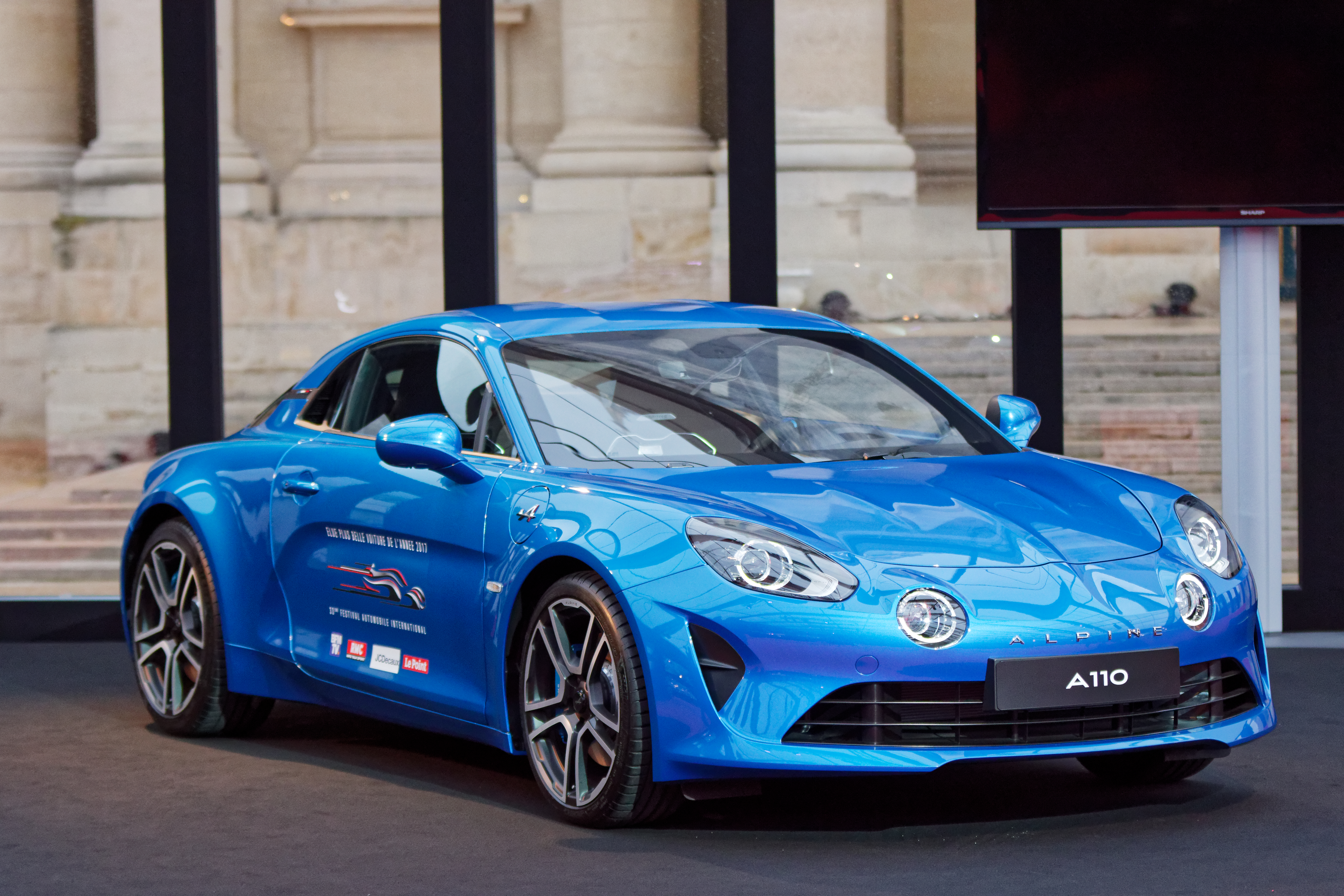
Alpine A110 (2017) (2017–present)

== United States ==
During the 1910s and 1920s, American manufacturers of smaller sports cars included Apperson, Kissel, Marion, Midland, National, Overland, Stoddard-Dayton and Thomas; manufacturers of larger sports cars included Chadwick, Mercer, Stutz Motor Company, and Simplex.

Since the 1960s, American performance cars have often been designed as muscle cars rather than sports cars. However, several American two-seat sports cars have also been produced, such as the 1953–present Chevrolet Corvette, 1962-1967 Shelby Cobra, 1983-1988 Pontiac Fiero, 1991-2017 Dodge Viper, and 2005-2006 Ford GT.

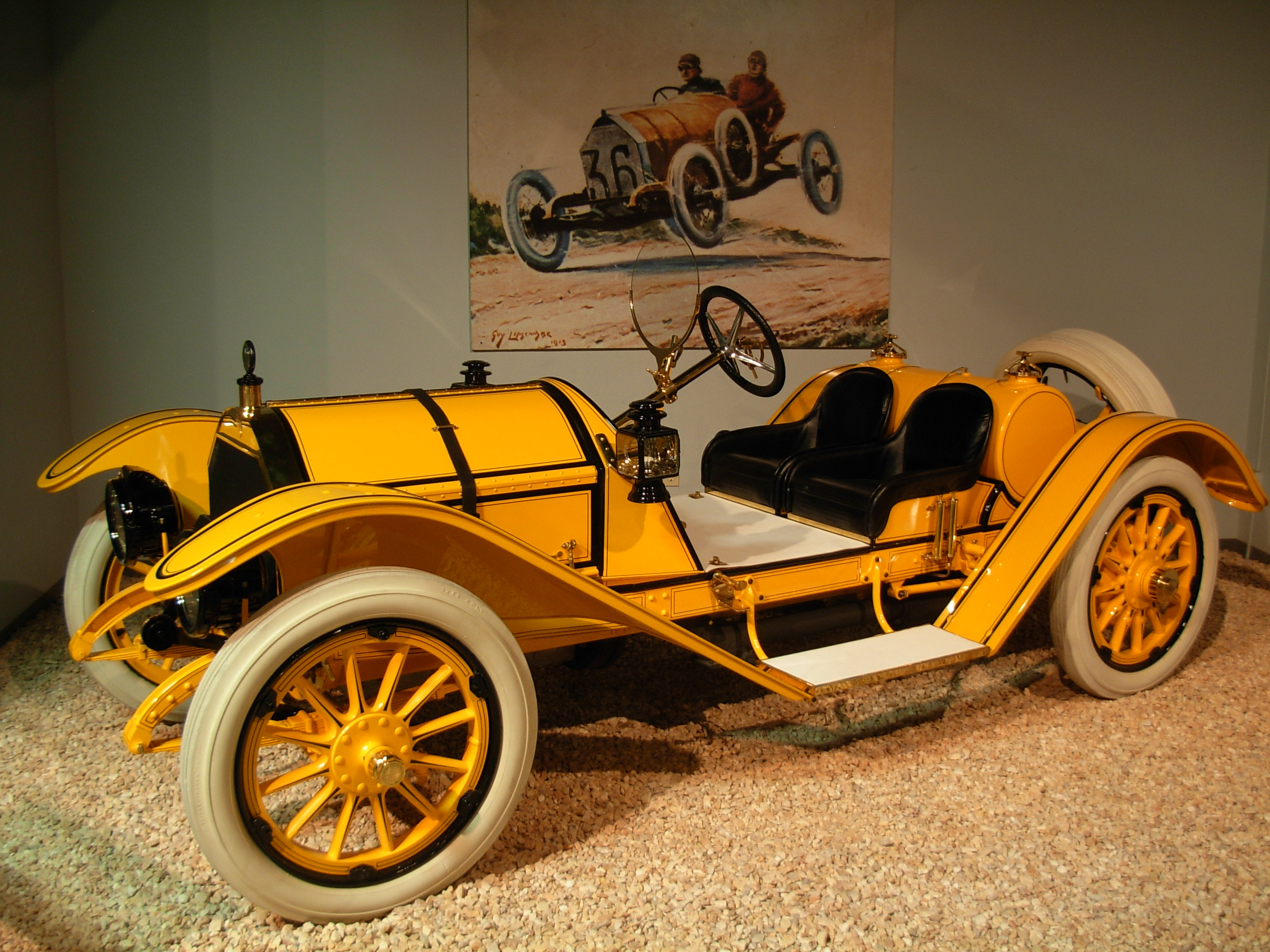
Mercer Type 35 Raceabout
(1910-1913)

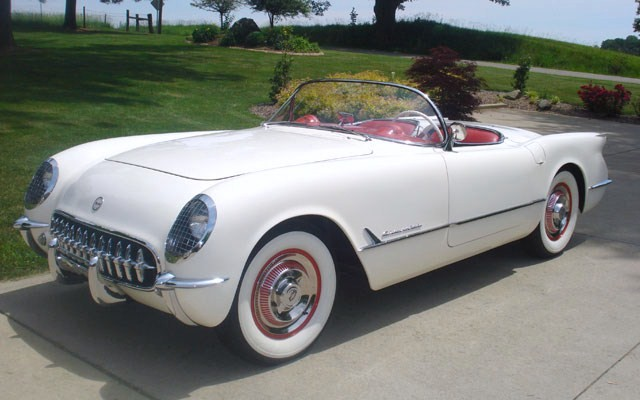
Chevrolet Corvette (C1)
(1953-1962)

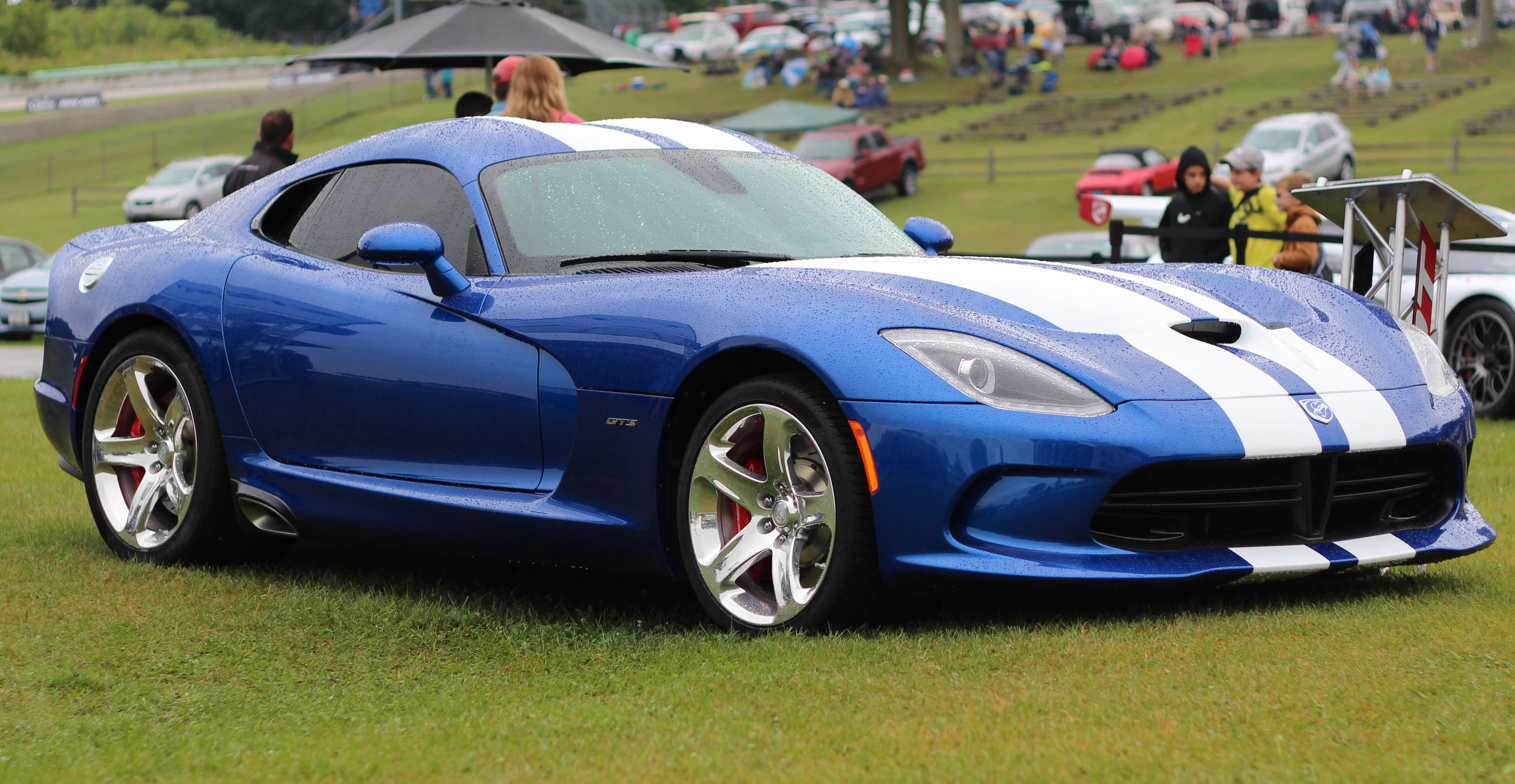
Dodge Viper (1991-2017)

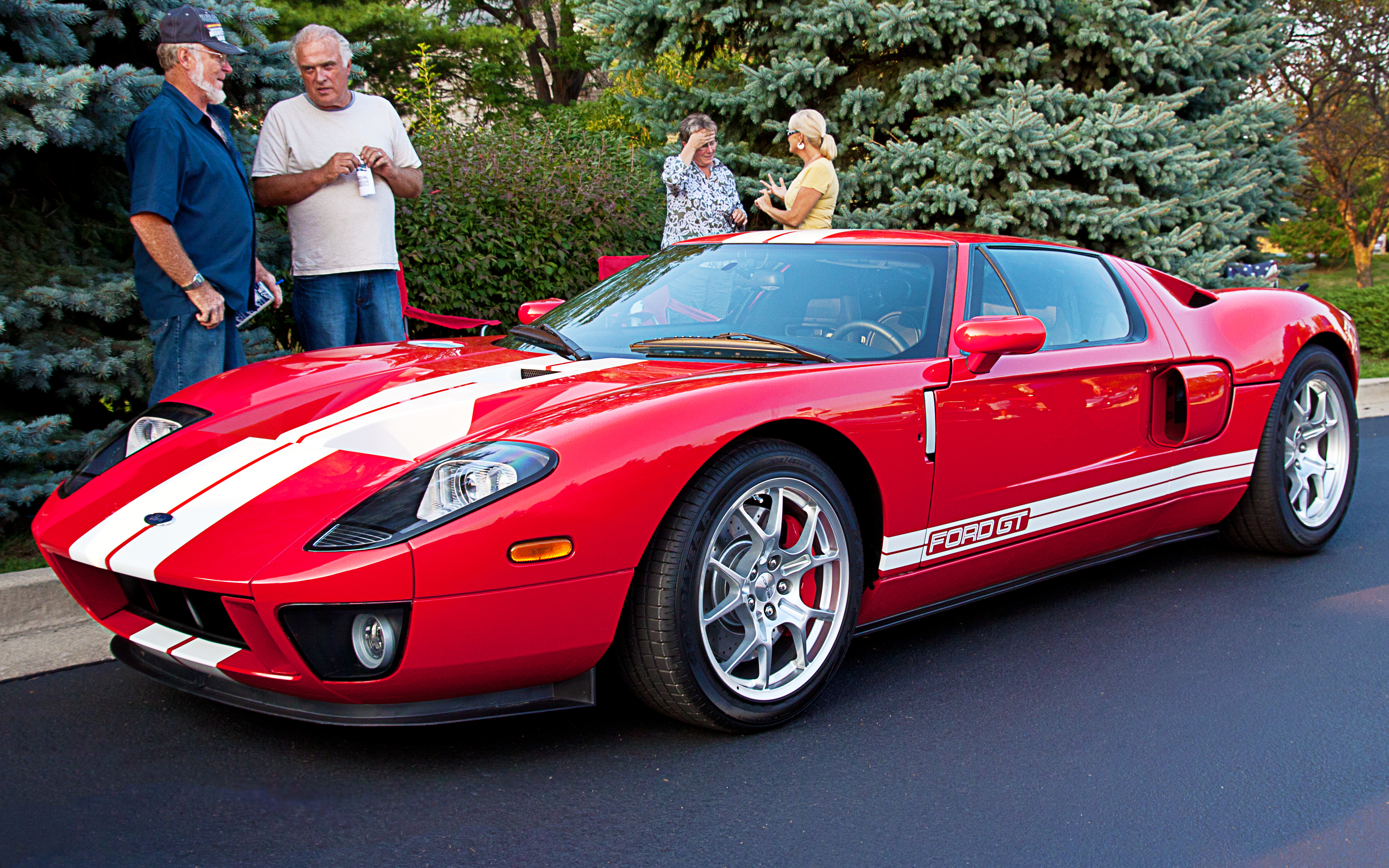
Ford GT
(2005-2006)

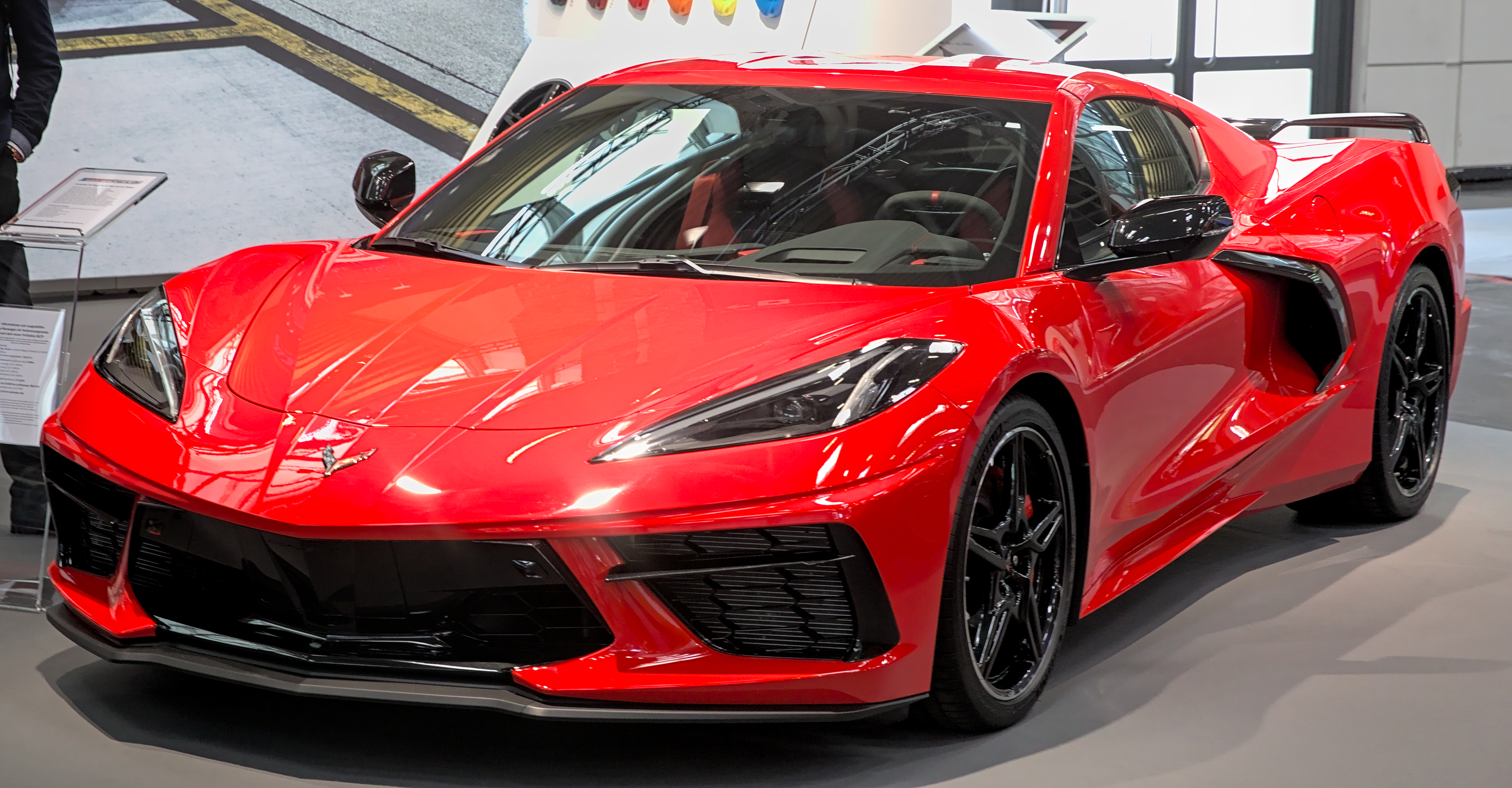
Chevrolet Corvette (C8)
(2019-present)

== Asia ==
=== 1959–1968: Beginnings ===
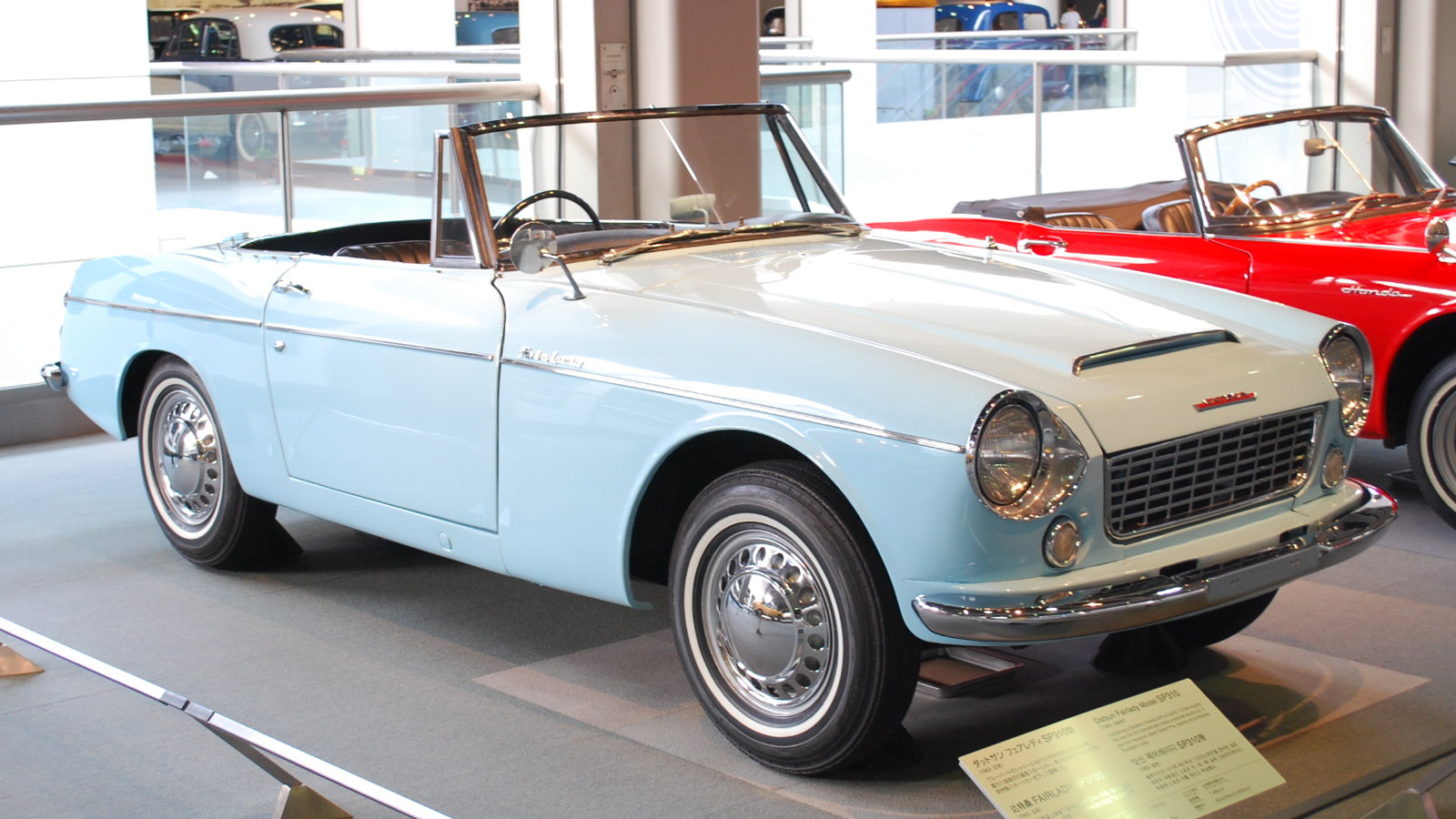
Datsun SP310 (1962)

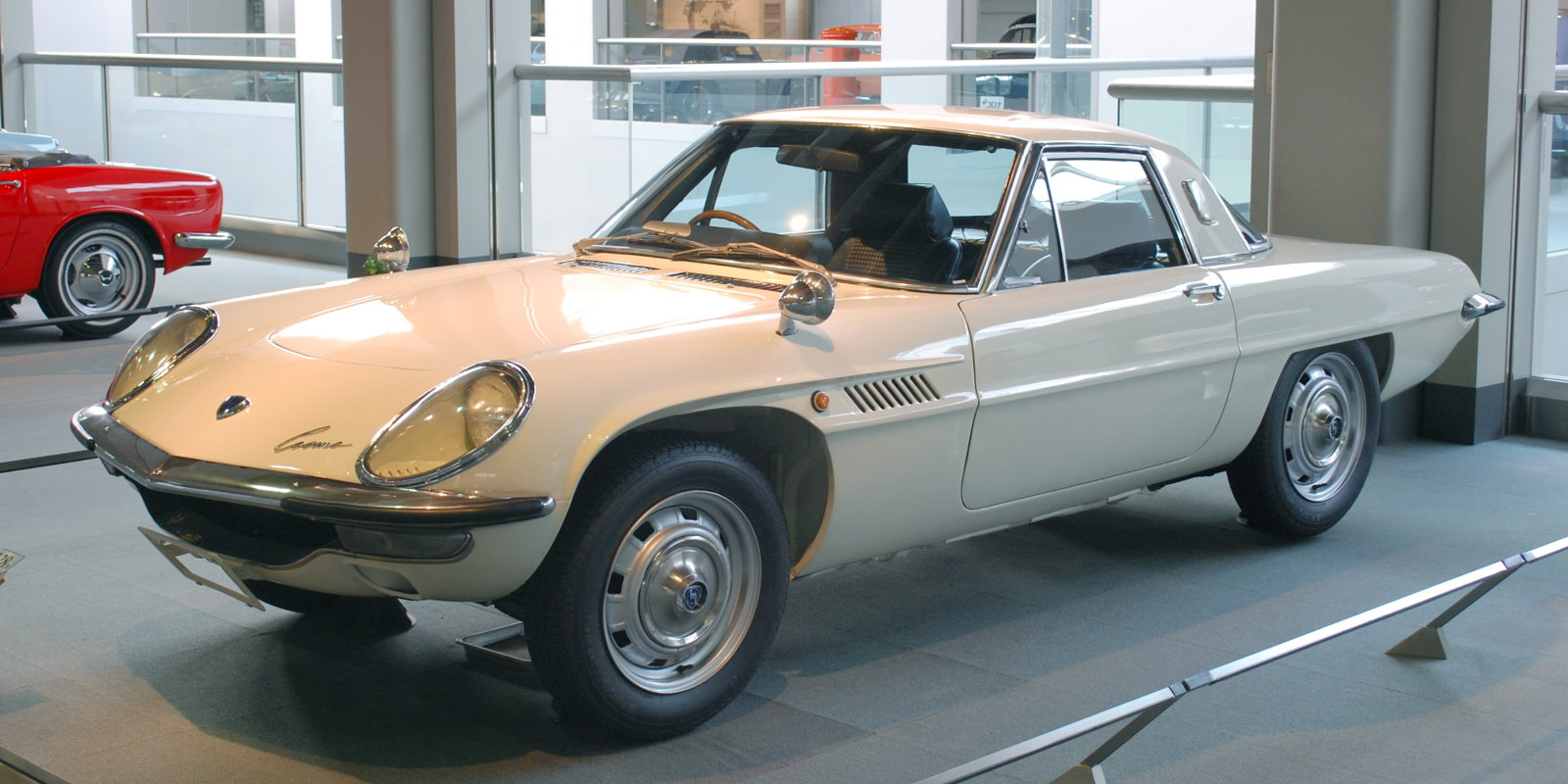
Mazda Cosmo (1968)

The first Japanese sports car was the 1959-1960 Datsun 211, a two-seat roadster built on the chassis of a compact pickup truck and powered by a 1.0 L (60 cu in) engine. Only 20 cars were built, and the 1963-1965 Datsun SP310— based on the chassis of a passenger sedan instead of a pickup truck— is often considered Datsun's first mass-production sports car.

Honda's first sports car was the 1963-1964 Honda S500, a two-seat roadster with independent suspension for all wheels and a 0.5 L (32 cu in) DOHC engine. In 1965, Toyota joined the two-seat roadster market with the Toyota Sports 800.

Mazda is noted for its use of Wankel engines, beginning in 1967 with the Mazda Cosmo. The Cosmo was a two-seat coupe with a 0.9 L (55 cu in) rotary engine producing up to 97 kW (130 bhp). Mazda continued to produce sports cars with rotary engines (sometimes turbocharged) until the Mazda RX-8 ended production in 2012.

The Toyota 2000GT, produced from 1967 to 1970, was an expensive two-seat coupe that greatly changed overseas perceptions of the Japanese automotive industry. The 2000GT demonstrated that Japan was capable of producing high-end sports cars to rival the traditional European brands.

=== 1969–1977: Mass production begins ===
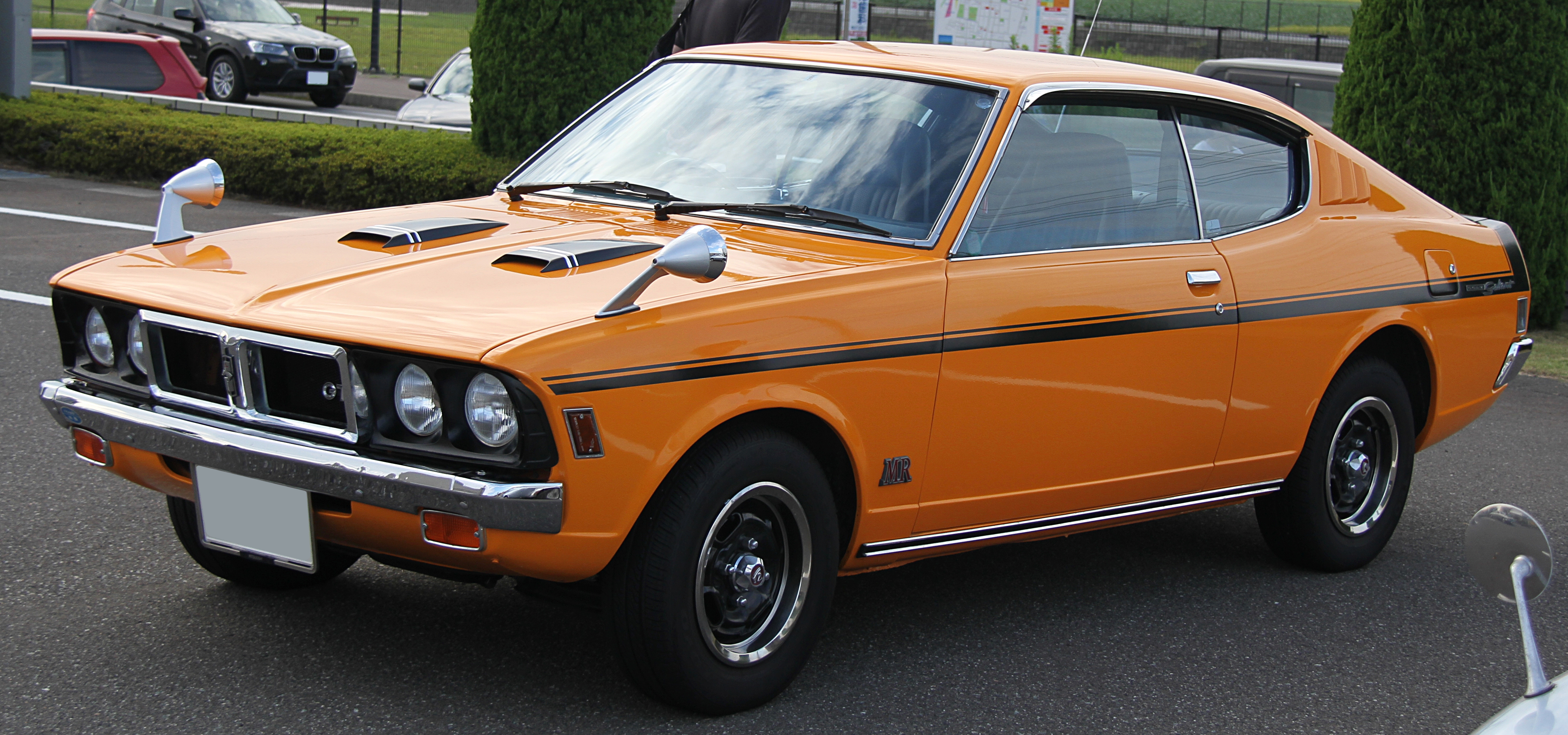
Mitsubishi Galant GTO (1970–1977)

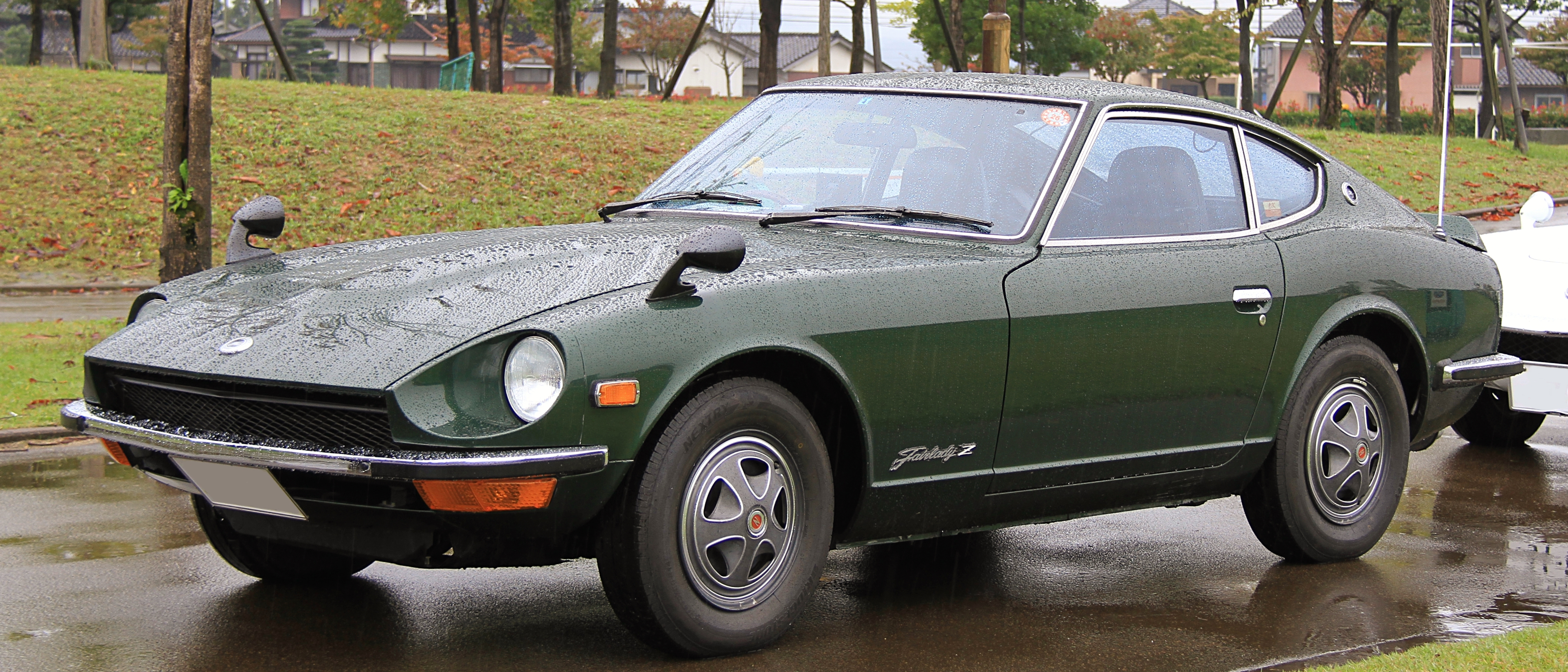
Datsun 240Z (1970–1974)

In 1969, Nissan introduced the Nissan Fairlady Z / Datsun 240Z two-seat coupe, powered by a 2.4 L (146 cu in) six-cylinder engine and described as providing similar performance to the Jaguar E-Type at a more affordable price. The 240Z began the lineage of Nissan "Z cars" which continues through to today's Nissan Z (RZ34). In 1974, Nissan expanded their coupe range with the Nissan Silvia 2+2 coupe, which was powered by a four-cylinder engine and produced until 2002.

Also in 1969, Mitsubishi's first performance car was introduced, in the form of the Mitsubishi Colt 11-F Super Sports coupe. The 11-F Super Sports was followed by the 1970-1977 Mitsubishi Galant GTO and 1971-1975 Mitsubishi Galant FTO, both based on a platform shared with the Galant sedan.

Toyota's mass-production 2+2 coupes of the 1970s consisted of the Celica, Supra, Corolla Levin, and Sprinter Trueno. The Celica was introduced in 1971 and remained in production until 2006. From 1979 to 1986, the Supra name was used for six-cylinder versions of the Celica, until the Supra moved to a separate platform from 1986 to 2002. The Corolla Levin / Sprinter Trueno were based on the Toyota Corolla hatchback platform and produced from 1972 to 2000.

The Nissan Skyline GT-R was initially produced as a sedan for two years before a coupe model was introduced in 1971. This first generation Skyline GT-R had rear-wheel drive, a 2.0 L (122 cu in) six-cylinder engine, and was produced until 1972.

=== 1978–1988: Front-wheel drive introduced ===
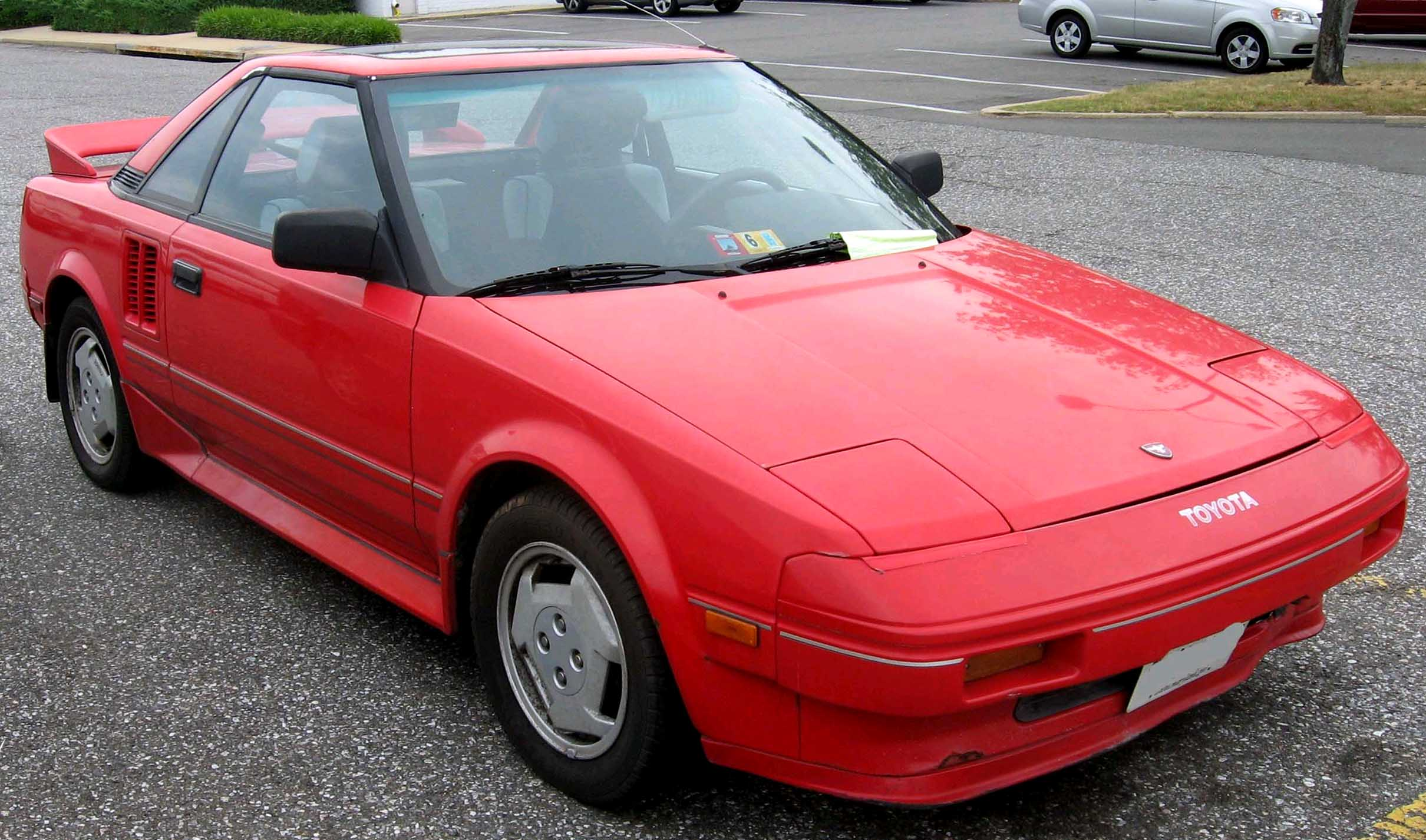
Toyota MR2 (1984–1985)

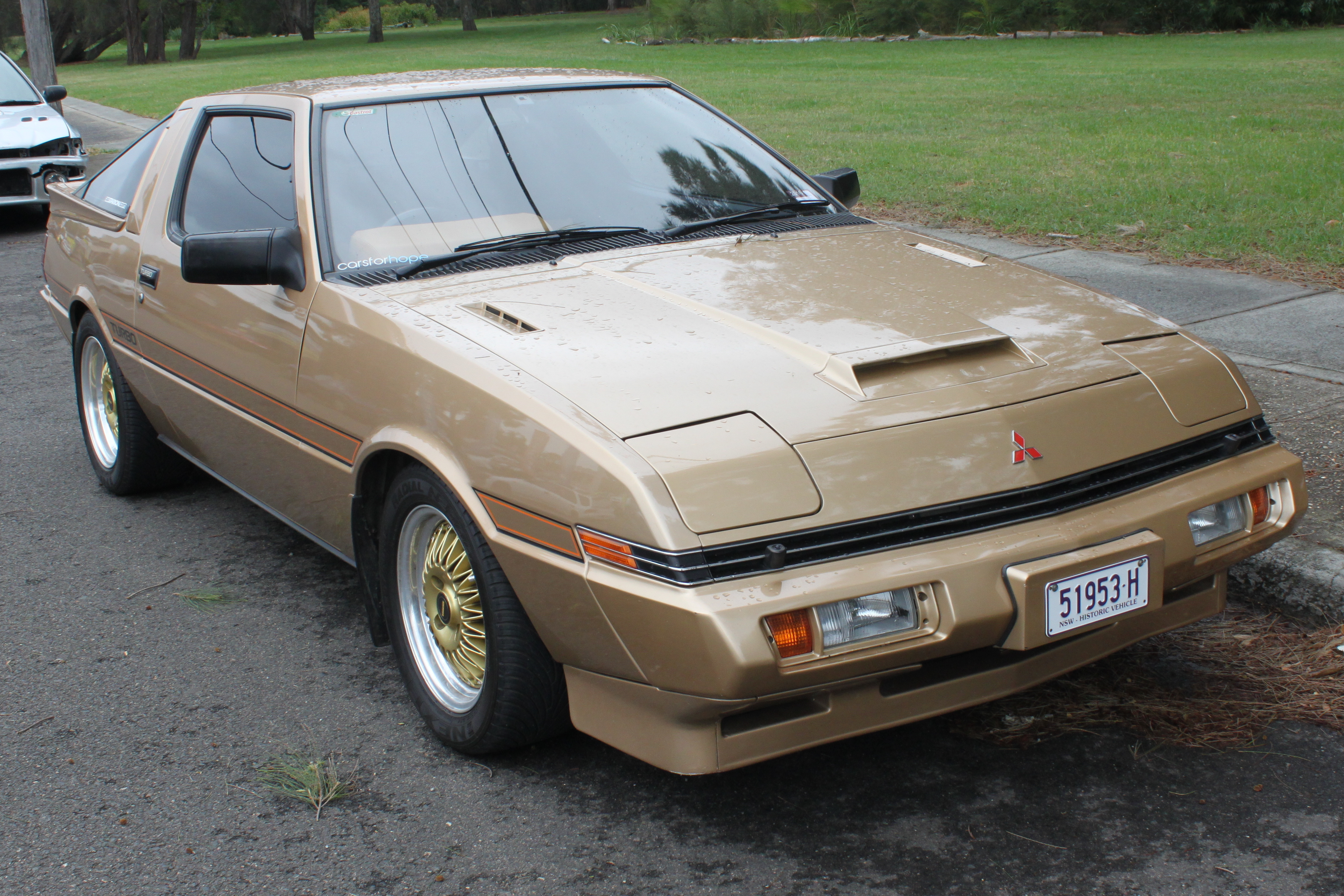
Mitsubishi Starion (1985)

The Honda Prelude front-wheel drive 2+2 coupe was launched in 1978 and remained in production until 2001. The 1985-2006 Honda Integra was also a front-wheel drive 2+2 coupe produced by Honda. Other 2+2 models included the 1982-1989 Mitsubishi Starion (turbocharged and rear-wheel drive) and the 1985-1991 Subaru XT (available with a turbocharger and all-wheel drive). Subaru has produced few sports cars in its history, instead focusing on rally-influenced sedans/hatchbacks for their performance models, such as the Liberty RS and Impreza WRX/STi models.

In 1984, the Toyota MR2 two-seat coupe became Japan's first production mid-engine car. The MR2 switched to a two-seat roadster body style for the final generation from 1999 to 2007.

The first Korean coupe model was the 1988 Hyundai Scoupe, which used front-wheel drive and was based on the Excel hatchback. The Scoupe was followed by 1996-2008 Hyundai Tiburon and 2011-2022 Hyundai Veloster.

=== 1989–2006: All-wheel drive, first supercars ===
In the 1990s, multiple Japanese automakers made flagship sports cars, such as the Toyota Supra, Nissan Skyline GT-R, Honda NSX, Mazda RX-7, and Mitsubishi 3000GT, which notably performed well against their European competition. These automakers had a well-documented gentlemen's agreement to officially limit advertised power figures for these vehicles to a maximum of 276 hp (280 PS; 206 kW).

The Nissan Skyline GT-R was reintroduced in 1989-2002 (R32, R33, and R34 generations) which became famous for their use of turbocharging and all-wheel drive, which provided performance comparable with many more expensive sports cars.

The 1990-2005 Honda NSX is considered by some to be Japan's first supercar, though others give the title to the earlier Toyota 2000GT. The NSX was praised for being more reliable and user-friendly than contemporary European supercars.

The Honda S2000 is an open top sports car that was manufactured from 1999 to 2009. The S2000 is named for its engine displacement of two liters, carrying on in the tradition of the S500, S600, and S800 roadsters of the 1960s. Its engine is notable for its high specific power output.

The Mitsubishi GTO coupe/convertible was introduced in 1990. The base models used front-wheel drive and a naturally aspirated V6 engine, however all-wheel drive and a turbocharged V6 engine were also available. To sit below the GTO in the model range, the Mitsubishi FTO front-wheel drive coupe was introduced in 1994. Both the GTO and FTO were discontinued in 2000.

Suzuki's first sports car was the 1991-1998 Suzuki Cappuccino, a two-seat roadster kei car with rear-wheel drive and a turbocharged 0.7 L (43 cu in) engine.

From 2003 to 2012 Mazda produced the Mazda RX-8, a rear-wheel drive quad coupé powered by a 1.3 L Renesis twin-rotor engine.

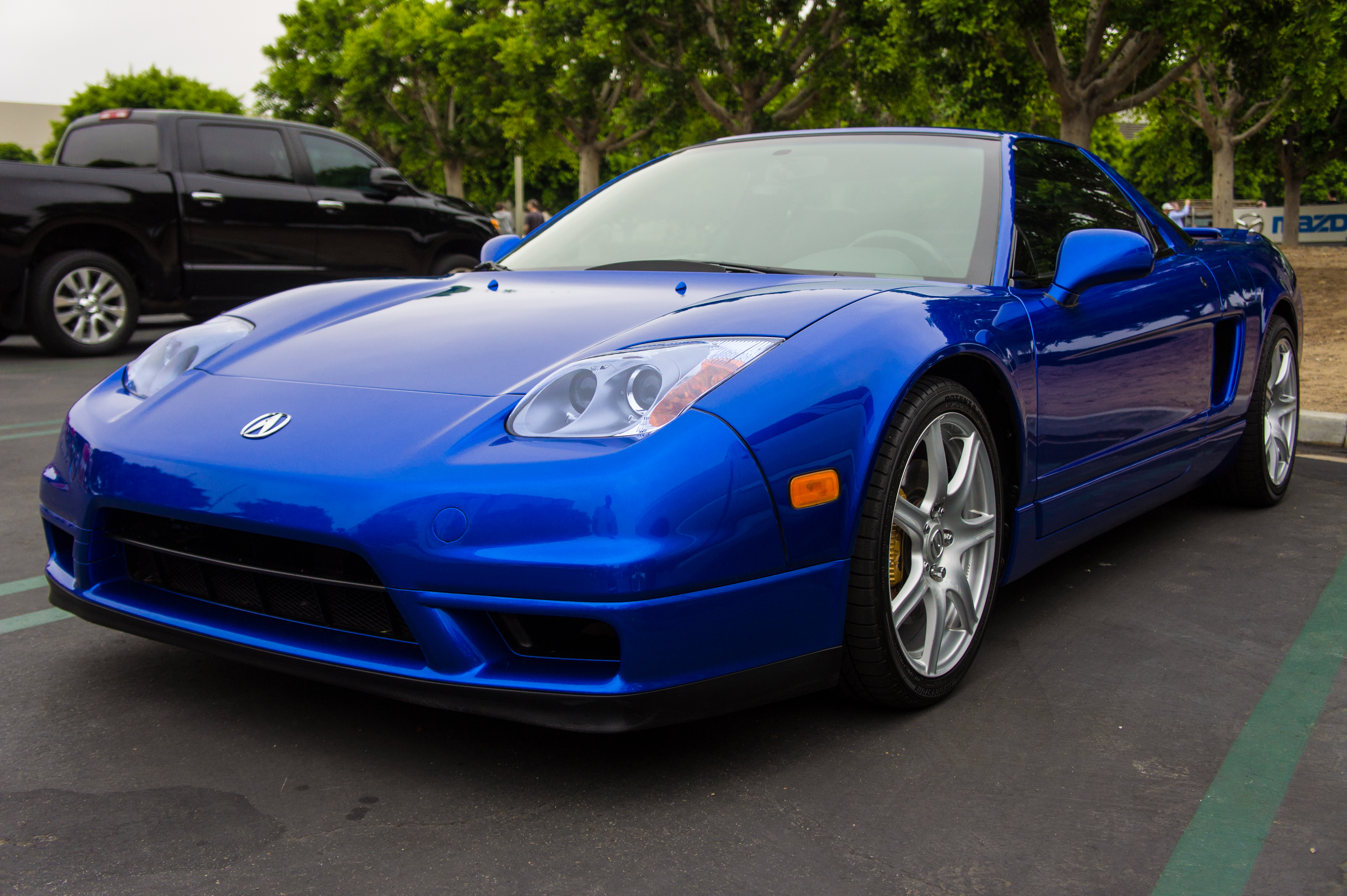
Honda NSX (1990–2005)

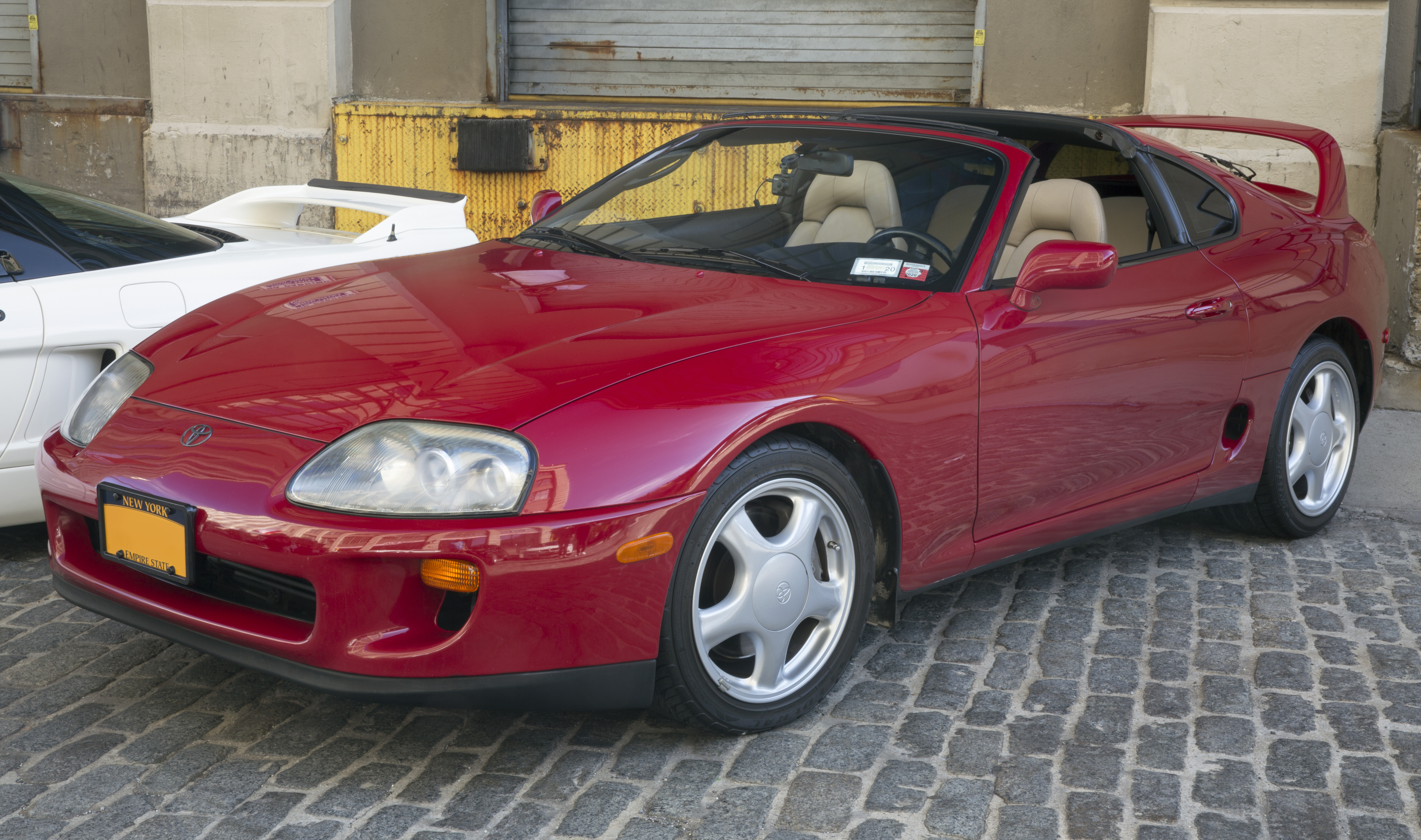
Toyota Supra (1994–2002)

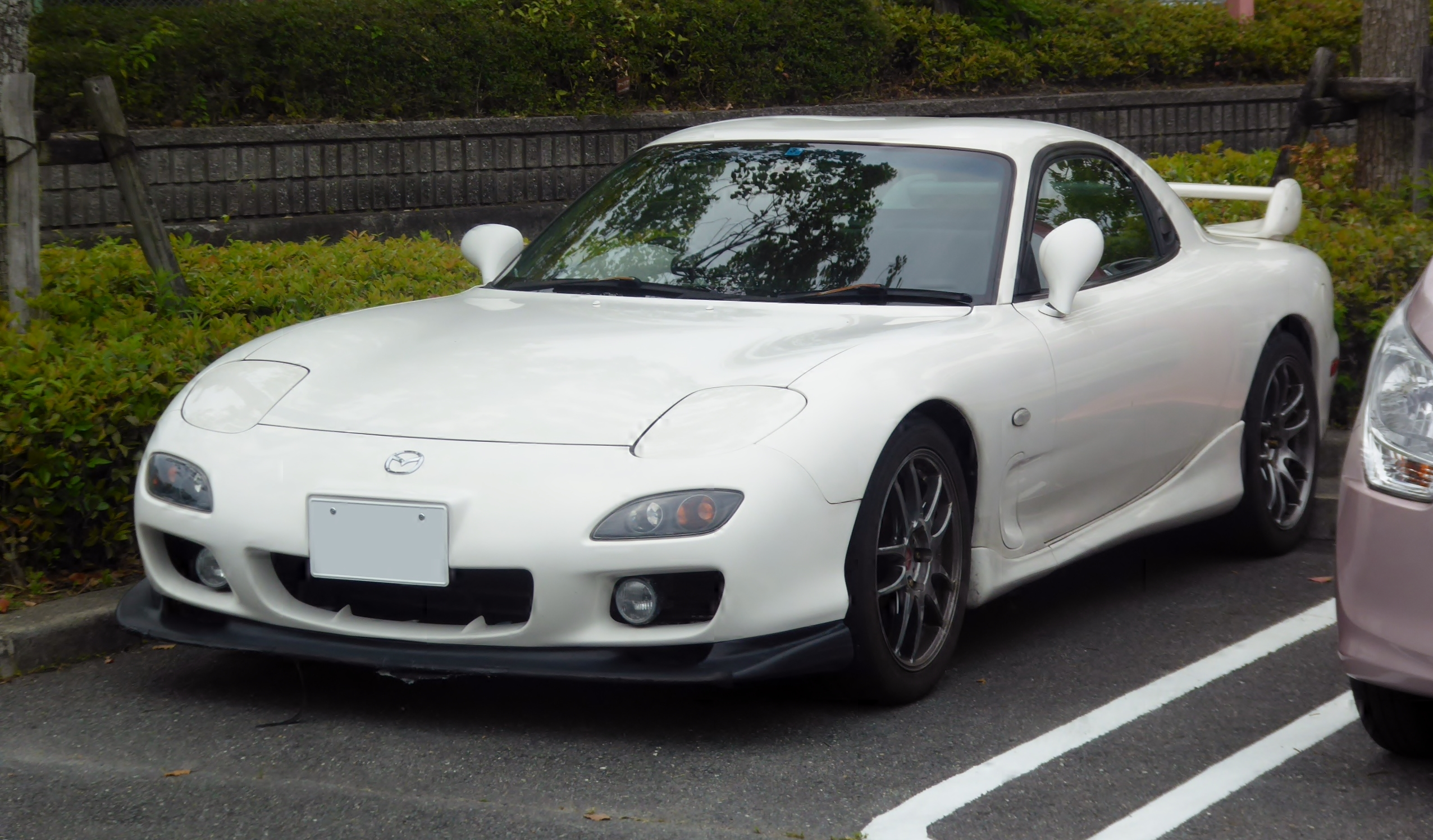
Mazda RX-7 (1992–1997)

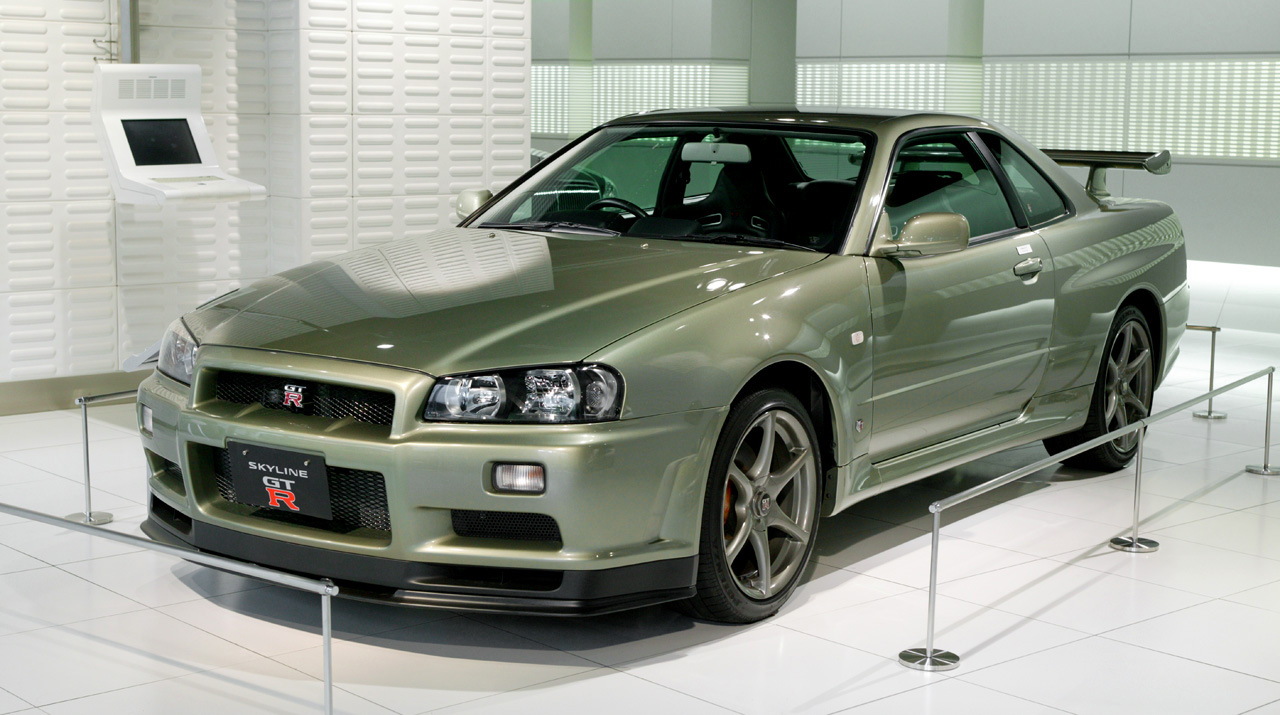
Nissan Skyline GT-R (1999–2002)

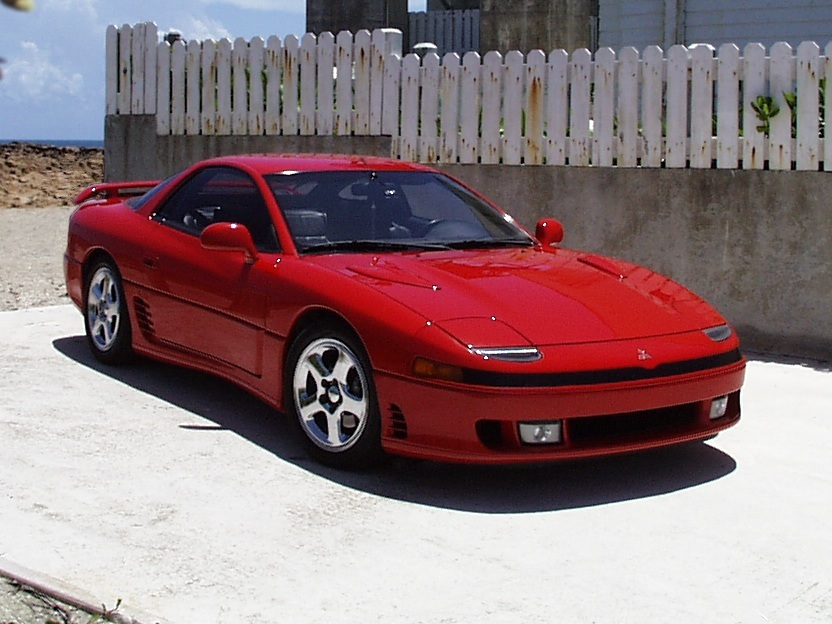
Mitsubishi GTO (1990–2000)

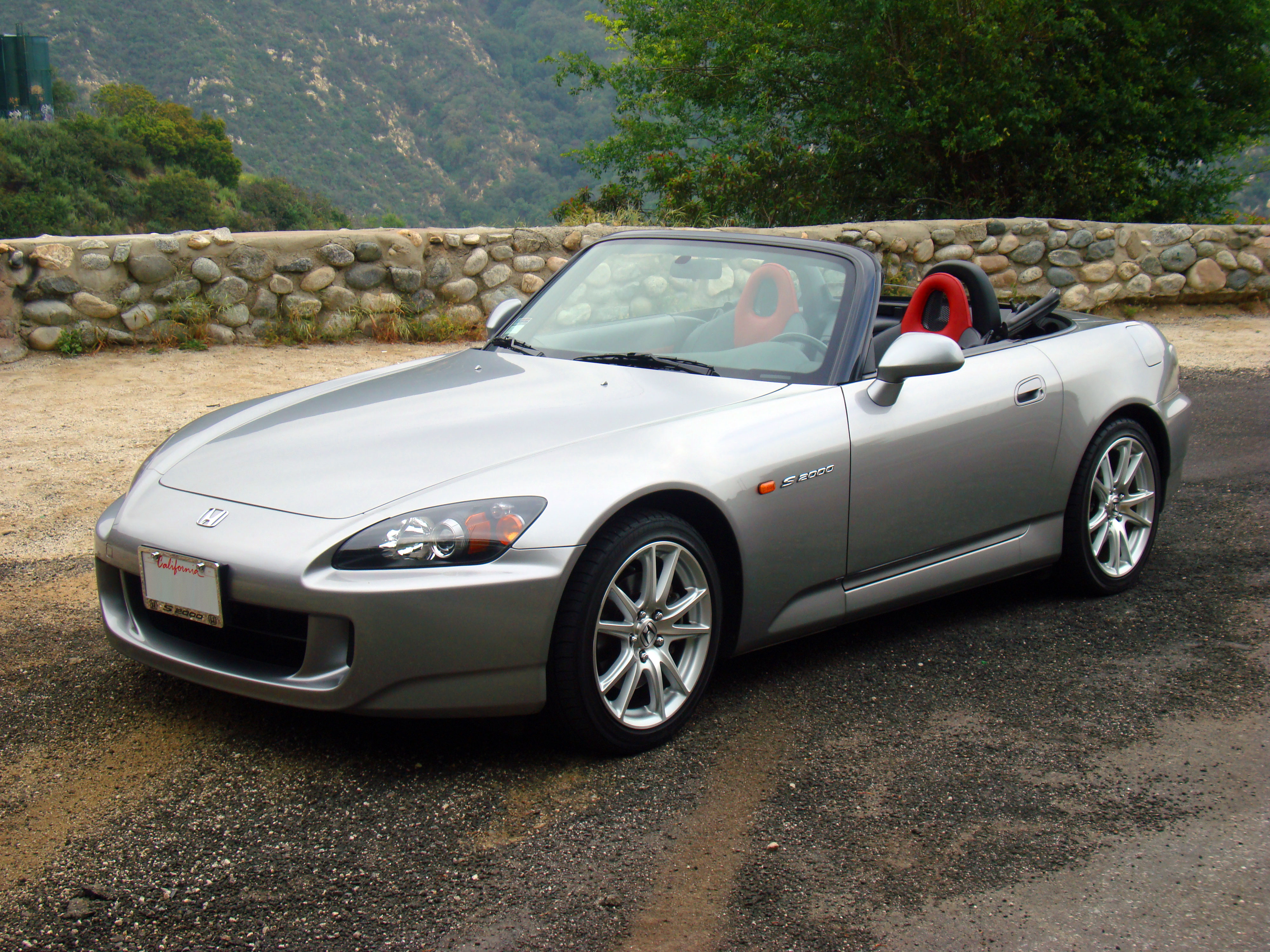
Honda S2000 (1999–2009)

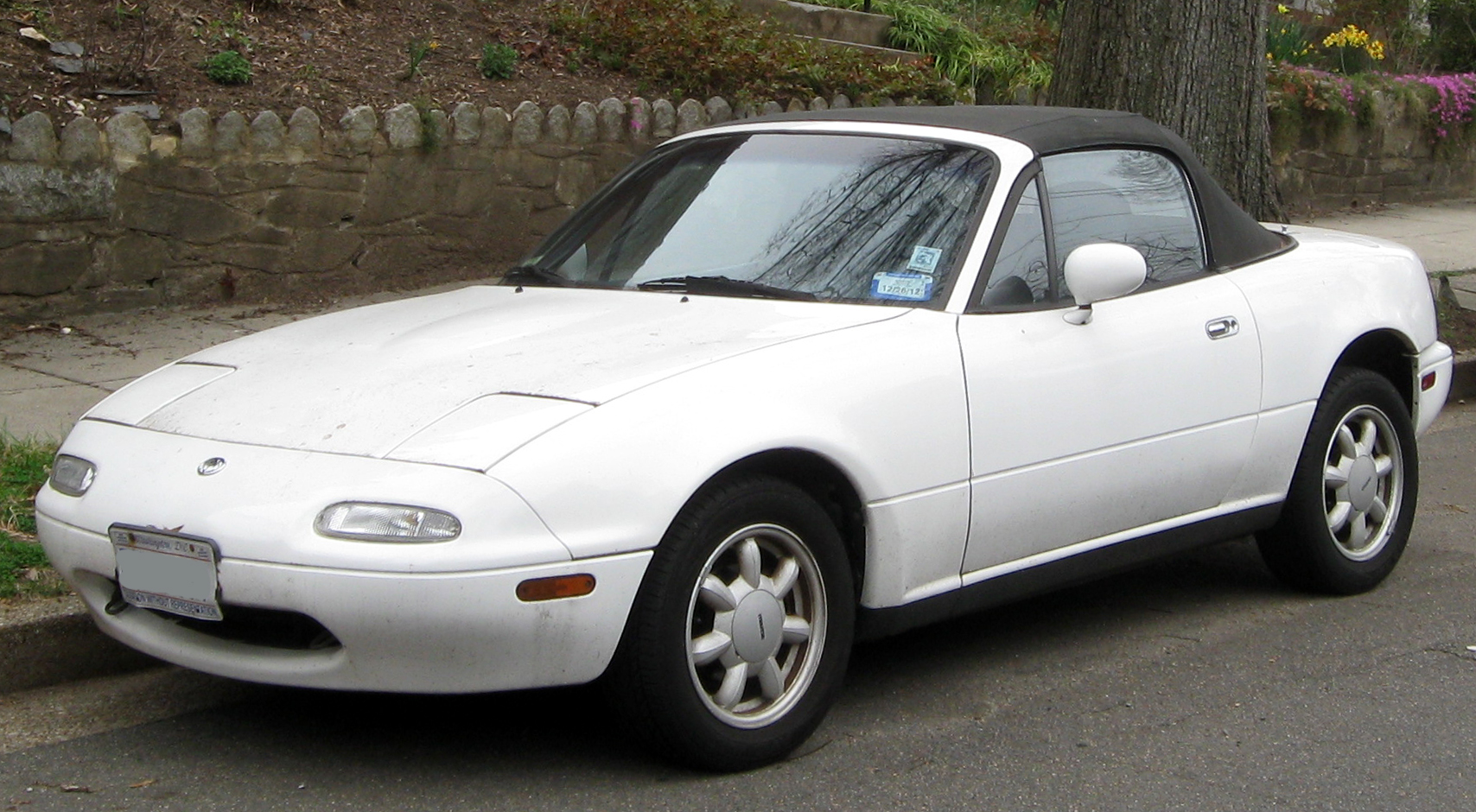
Mazda MX-5 (1989-1997)

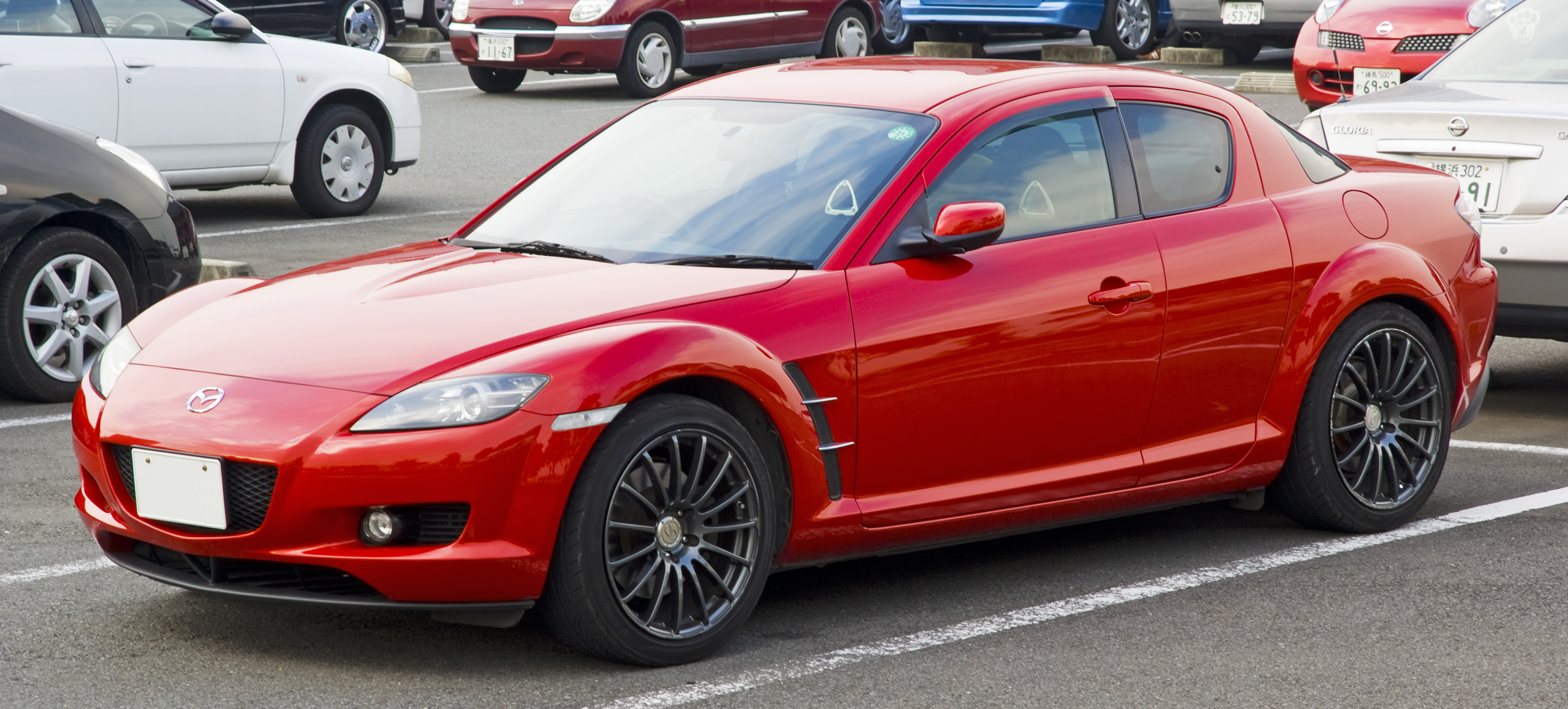
Mazda RX-8 (2003–2012)

=== 2007–present: declining popularity of coupes ===
Due to production constraints, lower demand, and environmental regulations, the viability of new Japanese sports cars began to decrease in the mid-2000s. The latest generation (R35) of the Nissan Skyline GT-R started production in 2007 as the Nissan GT-R. It was noteworthy for offering supercar performance with sports car practicality.

The Lexus LFA supercar was released by Lexus in 2010, a two-seat front-engine coupe powered by a 4.8 L (293 cu in) V10 engine.

The Toyota 86 / Subaru BRZ is a 2+2 coupe that was introduced in 2012 and currently remains in production with a new model released for the 2022 model year. The 86/BRZ is a rare modern example of a relatively affordable rear-wheel drive sports car.

The 2016–2022 Honda NSX (2nd generation) supercar marked a change in approach for Honda, by using all-wheel drive, a hybrid drivetrain, turbocharging, and a dual-clutch transmission.

Toyota relaunched the Supra nameplate in 2019 after a 17-year hiatus for the Toyota GR Supra front-engine, rear-wheel-drive coupe. Nissan also released the new RZ34 generation of their Nissan Z in 2022.

In recent years, China has also seen the emergence of a number of domestically produced sports car models, most of which are new hybrid or electric vehicles, represented by the NIO EP9, Hongqi S9, Yangwang U9, Hyptec SSR, and Neta GT.

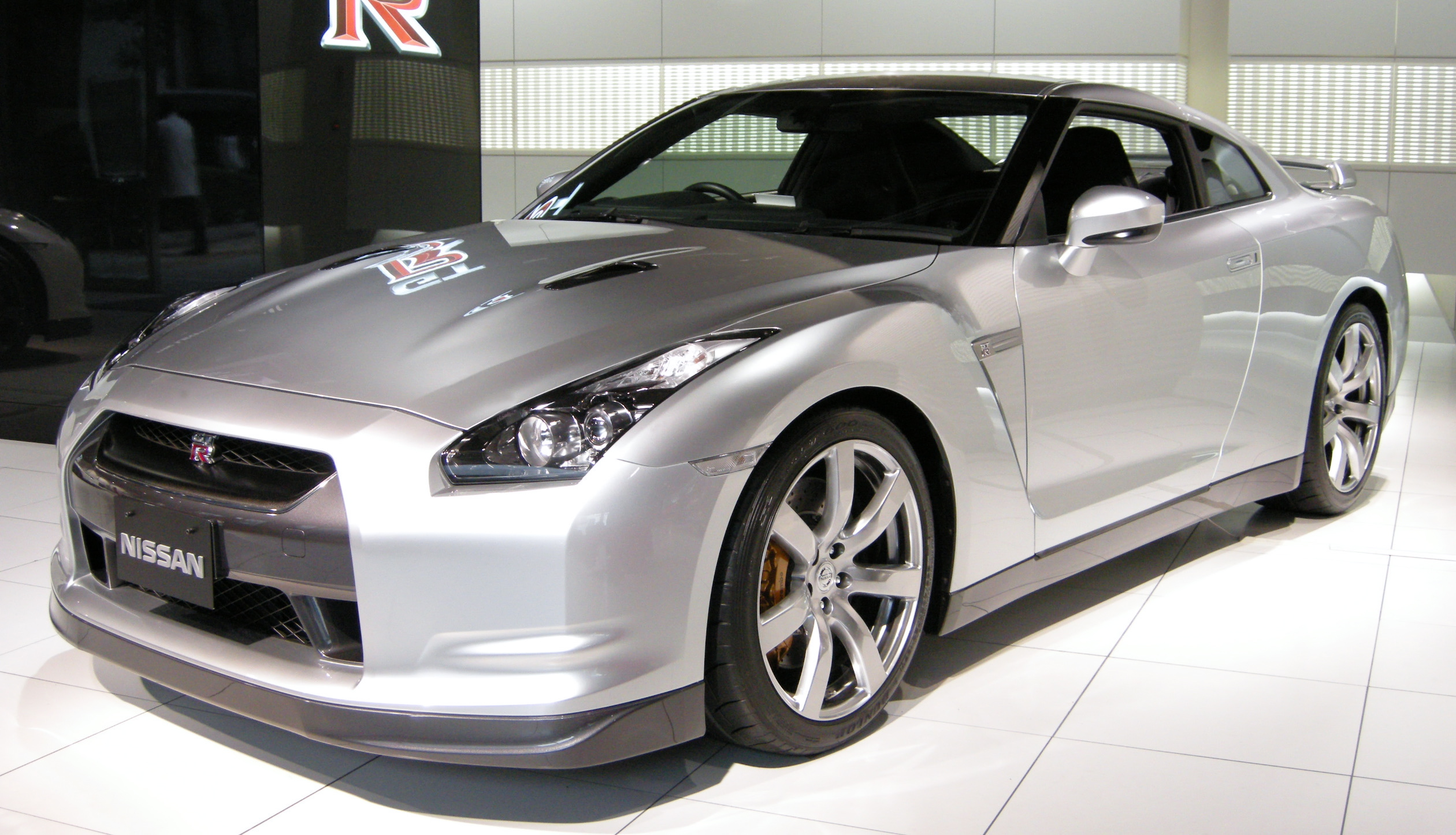
Nissan GT-R (2008–2024)

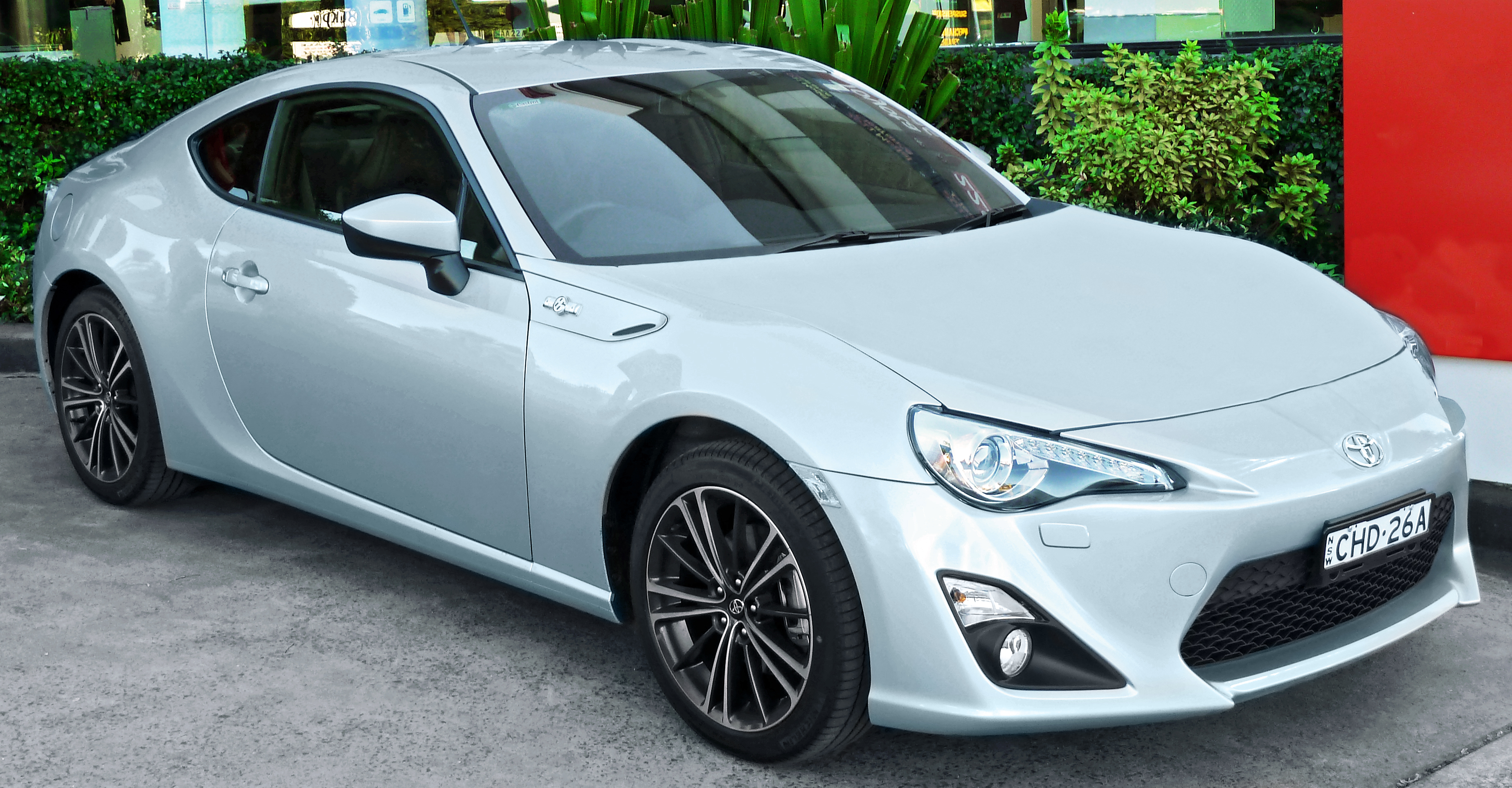
Toyota 86 (2012–2021)

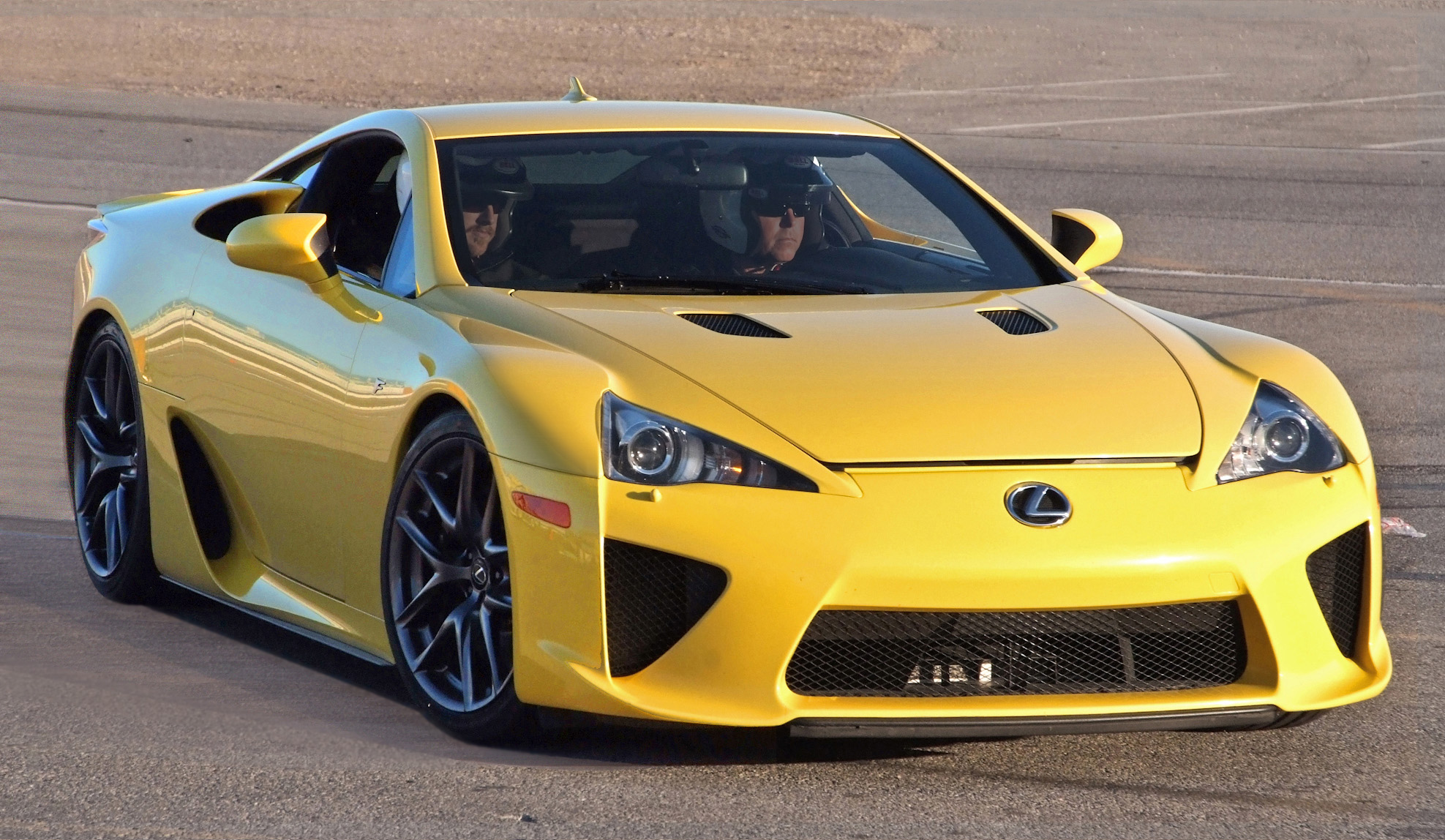
Lexus LFA (2010–2012)

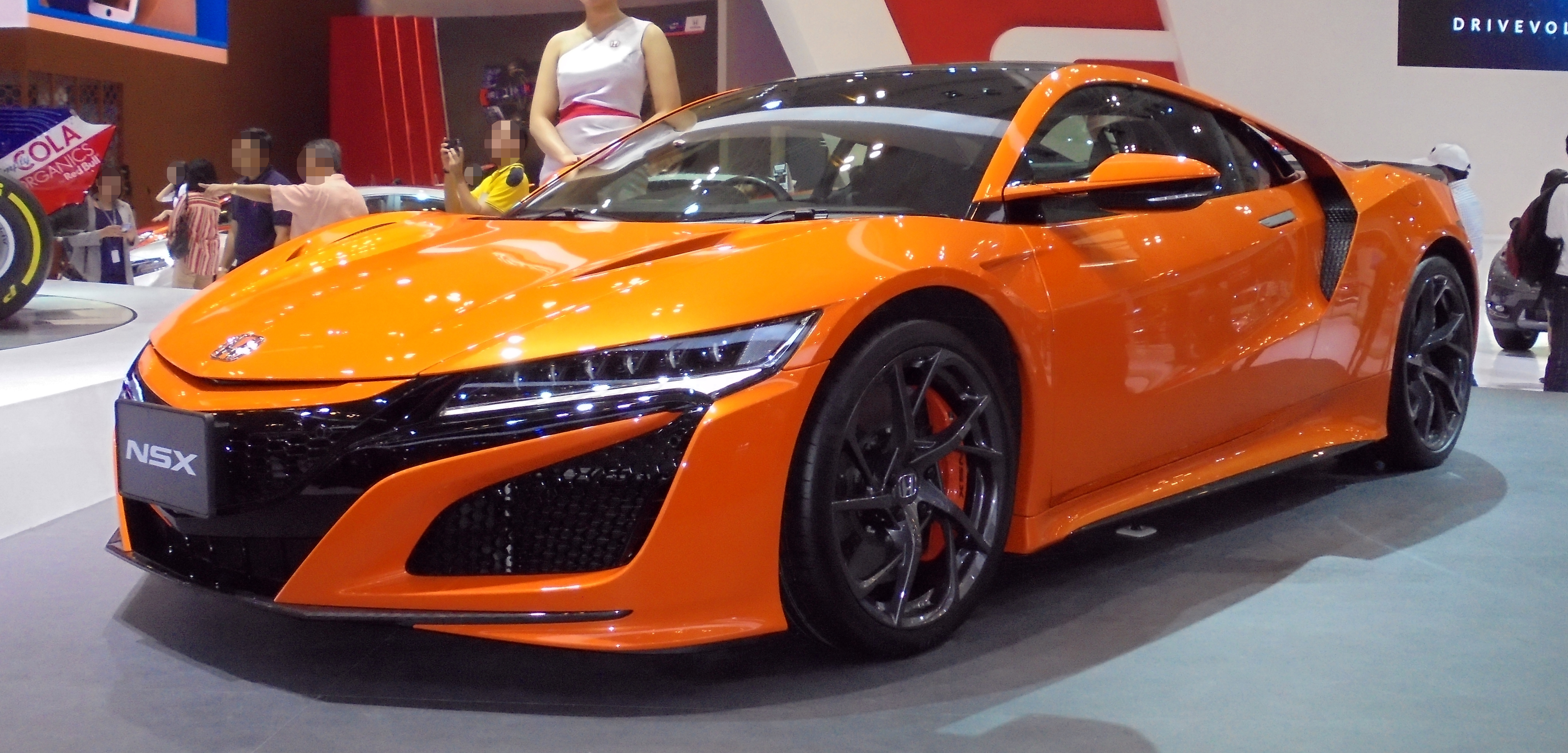
Honda NSX (2016–2022)

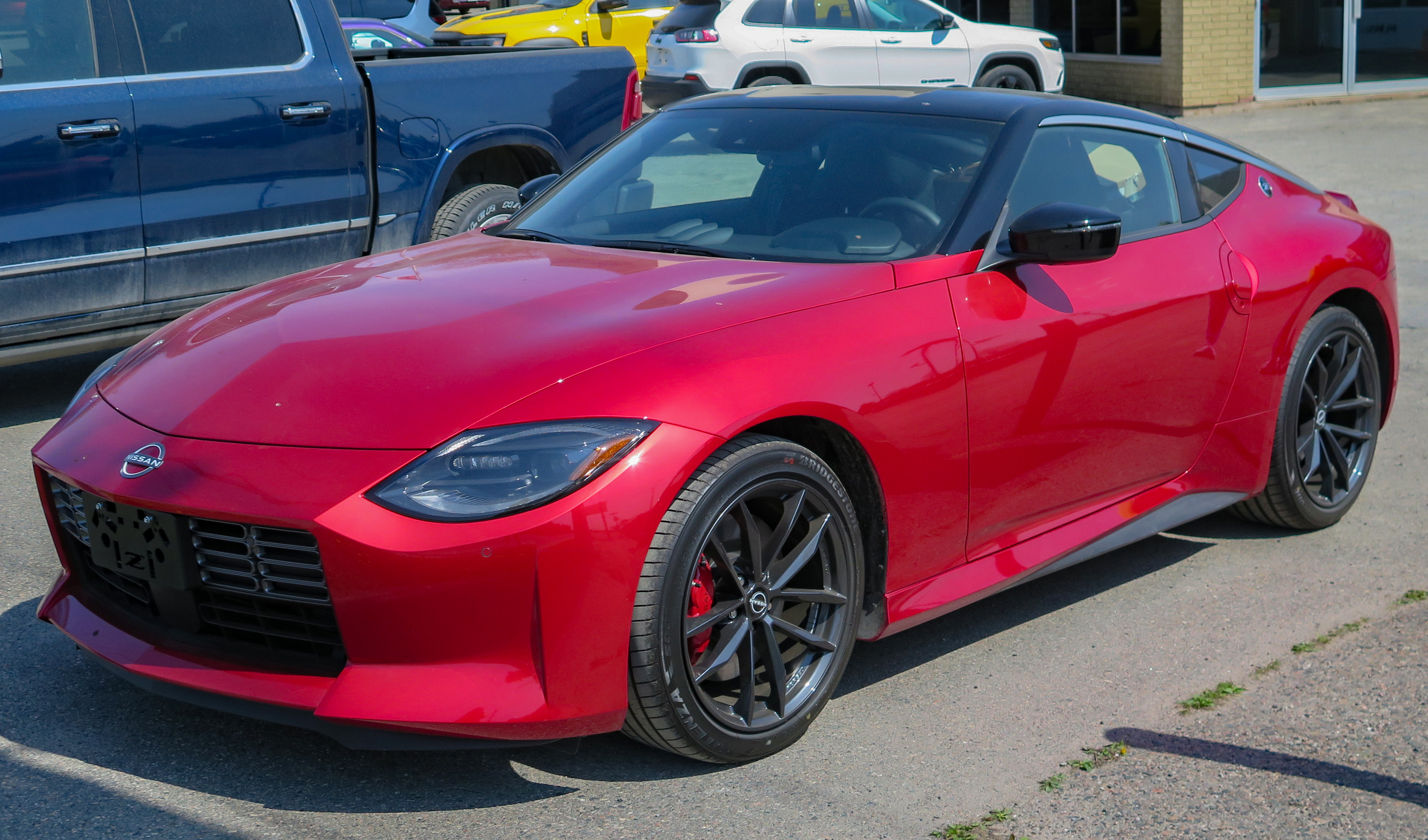
Nissan Z (2022–present)

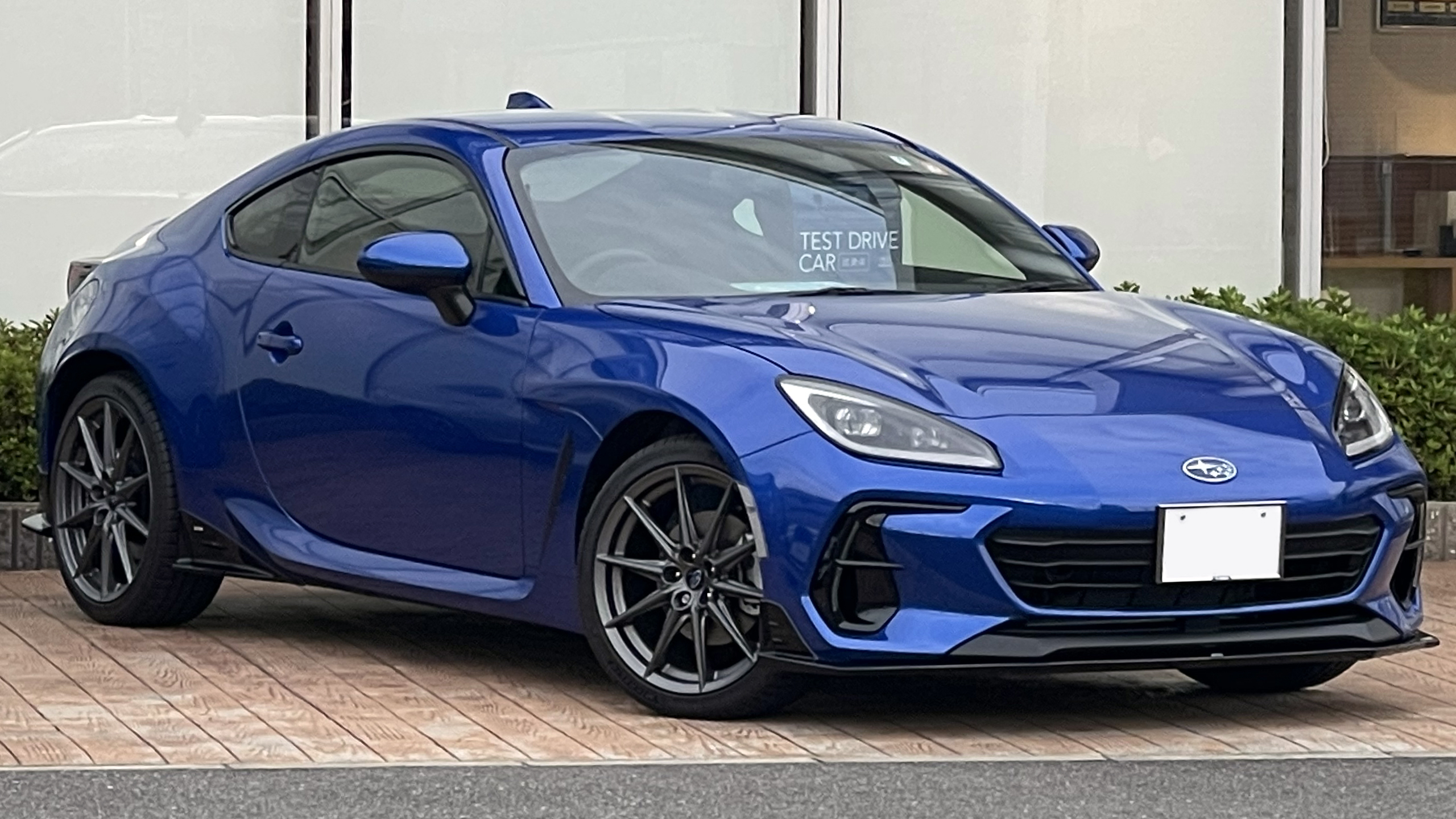
Subaru BRZ (2022–present)

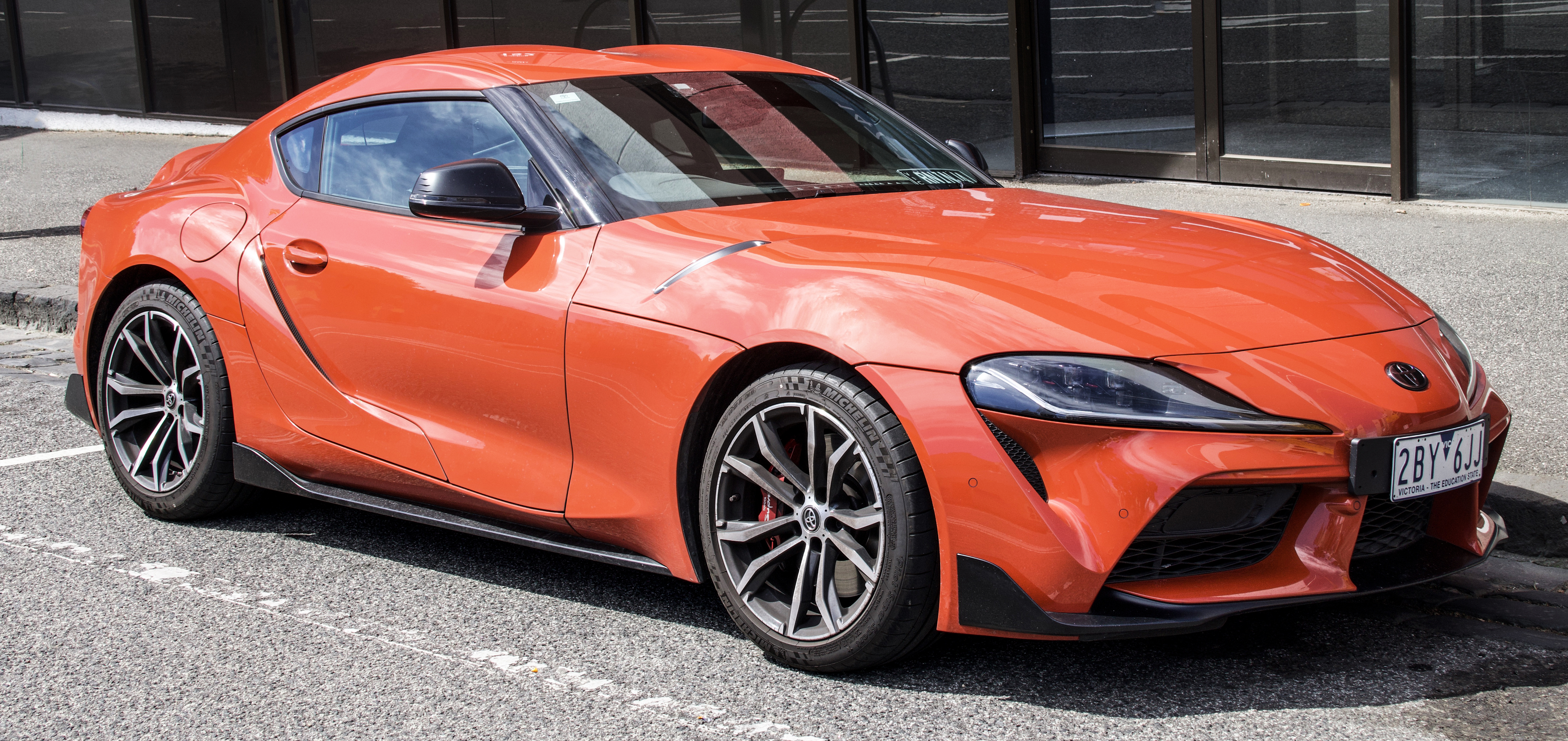
Toyota GR Supra (2020–present)

== See also ==
- List of sports car manufacturers
- List of sports cars
- Car classification
- Fuel efficiency
- History of the automobile
- Convertible
- Coupe
- Grand tourer
- Hot hatch
- Kit car
- Muscle car
- Roadster
- Sport compact
- Sports car racing
- Sports sedan
- Sport utility vehicle
- Supercar
- List of fastest production cars
