= List of microcars by country of origin: J =

== List ==
Country	Automobile Name	Manufacturer	Engine Make/Capacity	Seats	Year	Other information
Japan	Auto Sandal	Japan Auto Sandal Motors, Tokyo,	Mitsubishi 349 cc	2	1954	
Japan	Cony 360 Coach	Aichi Machine Industry Co Ltd, Nagoya	354 cc		1952-1967	
Japan	Cony Guppy	Aichi Machine Industry Co Ltd, Nagoya	199 cc	2	1952-1967	
Japan	Daihatsu Bee	Daihatsu Kogyo Co Ltd, Ikeda, Osaka	Daihatsu 540 cc		1951-	
Japan	Daihatsu Fellow	Daihatsu Kogyo Co Ltd, Ikeda, Osaka	Daihatsu 356 cc		1967-1977	
Japan	Daihatsu Fellow Max	Daihatsu Kogyo Co Ltd, Ikeda, Osaka	Daihatsu 547 cc		1977-1989	
Japan	Daihatsu Mira	Daihatsu Kogyo Co Ltd, Ikeda, Osaka	Daihatsu 660 cc		1980-	
Japan	Daihatsu Midget I	Daihatsu Kogyo Co Ltd, Ikeda, Osaka	Daihatsu ZA 250 cc	1	1957-	
Japan	Daihatsu Midget II	Daihatsu Kogyo Co Ltd, Ikeda, Osaka	Daihatsu EF 660 cc	1 or 2	1996-	van and light truck versions
Japan	Flying Feather	Suminoe Seisakusho, Kyoto	350 cc	2	1955	ja:住江製作所・フライングフェザー
Japan	Fuji Cabin	Fuji Motors Corp, Tokyo	Gasuden 125 cc 5.5 hp (4 kW)	2	1957-1958	See also fi:Fuji Cabin, Fuji Cabin
Japan	Honda S360	Honda	356 cc	2	1962	sports car Not sold
Japan	Honda S500	Honda	531 cc	2	1963	sports car
Japan	Honda S600	Honda	606 cc	2	1964	sports car
Japan	Honda N360	Honda	354 cc	4	1967	
Japan	Honda T360	Honda	356 cc 30Ps	2	1963	small utility truck
Japan	Mibot	KG Motors	5 kW electric	1	2027	announced for preorder in 2025
Japan	Mitsubishi Minica	Mitsubishi				initially named the "360"
Japan	Mazda R360	Mazda	356 cc	2	1961	
Japan	Mazda Carol	Mazda	water-cooled OHV 358 cc	4	1962	
Japan	Mitsuoka BuBu	MitsuokaToyama	50 cc	1	1982	
Japan	Mitsuoka K-1(MC-1)	MitsuokaToyama	50 cc	1	1998	
Japan	Mitsuoka K-2	Mitsuoka	50 cc	1	1998	
Japan	Mitsuoka K-3	Mitsuoka	50 cc	1	2005	
Japan	Mitsuoka K-4	Mitsuoka	50 cc	1	2006	
Japan	Subaru 360	Subaru	356 cc	4	1958	(Imported into the US in considerable numbers.)
Japan	Toyota C+pod	Toyota Motomachi plant	9.2 kW electric	1 or 2	2021-	
Japan	Toyota COMS	Toyota Kariya and Toyoda	2x2kW (1st gen) or 5 kW (2nd gen) electric	1	2000-	
Japan	Vantage					various models, small utility trucks
