= Honda S series =

The Honda S series is a series of convertible sports cars by Honda.

- 1962 Honda S360
- 1963–1964 Honda S500
- 1964–1966 Honda S600
- 1966–1970 Honda S800
- 1999–2009 Honda S2000
- 2015–2022 Honda S660
