= TN7 =

TN7 or TN-7 may refer to:

- Tennessee's 7th congressional district
- Tennessee State Route 7
- Honda TN7, a pickup truck
- TN7, a postcode district in Wealden, England; see TN postcode area
