= TN5 =

TN5 or TN-5 may refer to:

- Tennessee's 5th congressional district
- Tennessee State Route 5
- Transposase Tn5, an enzyme
- Honda TN-V, a pickup truck
- TN5, a postcode district in Wadhurst, England; see TN postcode area
