= Honda L700 =

Commercial station wagon produced by Honda (1965-1967)

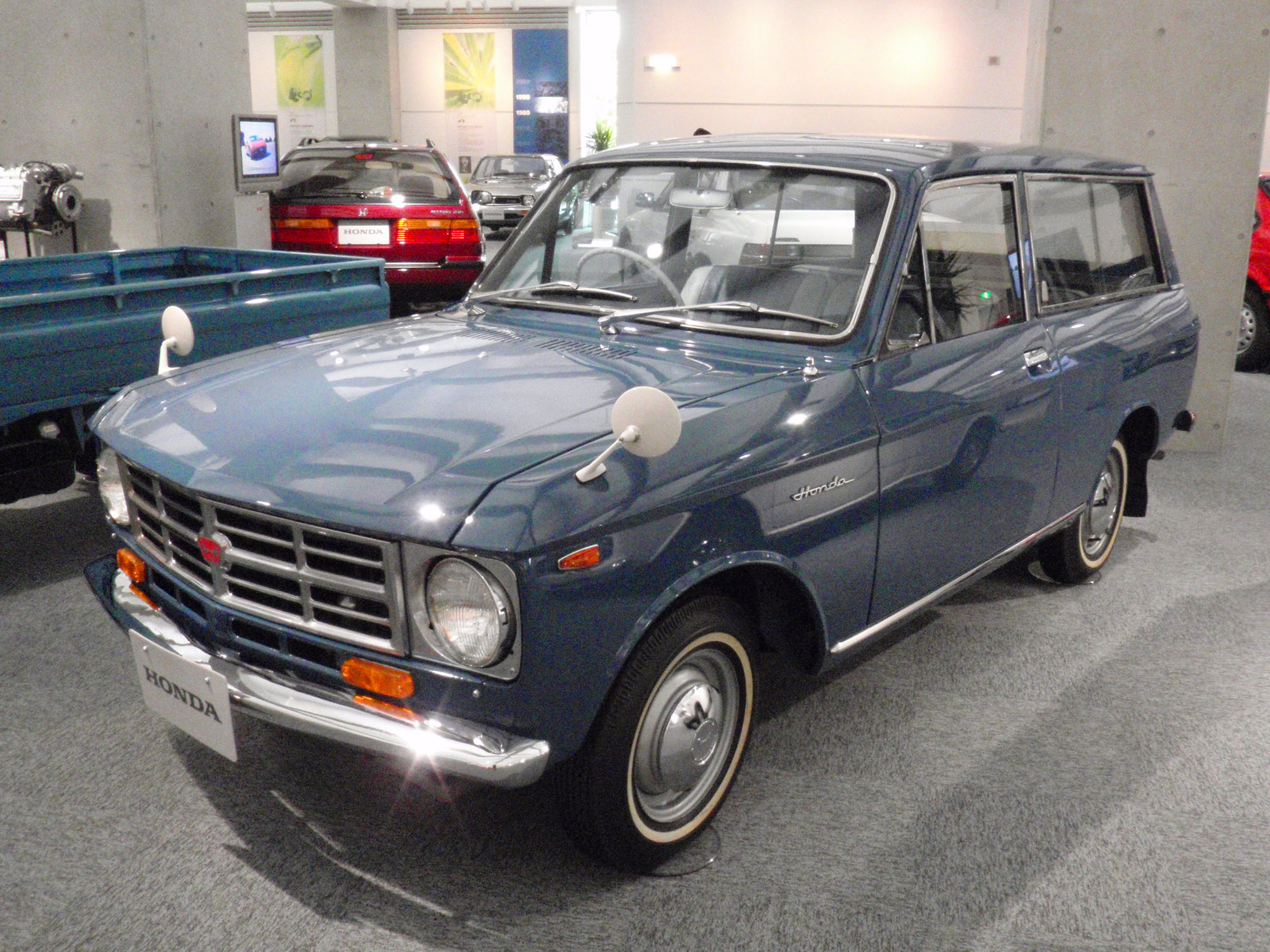

Overview
- Manufacturer: Honda
- Also called: Honda L800
- Production: Sayama Plant, Sayama, Saitama, Japan; L700: October 1965-September 1966; L800: September 1966-November 1967

Body and chassis
- Class: Minivan
- Body style: 3-door wagon
- Layout: FR layout
- Related: Honda S600; Honda S800; Honda T500

Powertrain
- Engine: 687 cc DOHC I4; 791 cc DOHC I4

Dimensions
- Wheelbase: 2,245 mm (88.4 in)
- Length: 3,690 mm (145 in)
- Width: 1,485 mm (58.5 in)
- Height: 1,400 mm (55 in)
- Curb weight: 800 kg (1,764 lb) (LM700)

The L700 is a commercial station wagon from Honda. Produced for only eleven months beginning in October 1965, it shared the S600 roadster's mechanicals and used a bored out version of that car's high-tech inline-four engine. At 687 cc, the revvy DOHC engine produced 52 PS (38 kW) at 7,500 rpm with twin side-draft carburettors. Torque is 5.8 kg⋅m (57 N⋅m; 42 lb⋅ft) at 4,500 rpm.

The L700 was designed for commercial deliveries and was referred to by Honda as a light van, but it appeared as a conventional station wagon, seating five. Only a four-speed manual transmission was available, the front suspension was an independent MacPherson struts while the rear was a conventional leaf sprung live axle. Two models were built — the basic LA700 and better-equipped LM700. A third version, called the Honda P700 was a small pick-up truck version, with an exposed load bay and a standard cab situated behind the engine, using the same chassis as the L700 (front engine, rear drive). It appeared a month after the L700. 12,763 L700 and 1328 P700 were built. Payload for all L and P-series models was 400 kg (882 lb).

== L800 ==
The L700 was replaced in 1966 by the L800. Basically an L700 with a 58 PS (43 kW) 791 cc engine, the L800 was introduced at the Tokyo Motor Show in 1966. The engine came from the S800 roadster but used a single side-draft carburettor. Top speed is 150 km/h (93 mph). It was available in LA and LM trim levels like the L700. The "L" prefix is a naming reference to lorry, from the British word for "truck." 7,275 L800 were built, alongside 1,079 P800. In total, 22,445 of all L- and P-series models were built; very few remain.

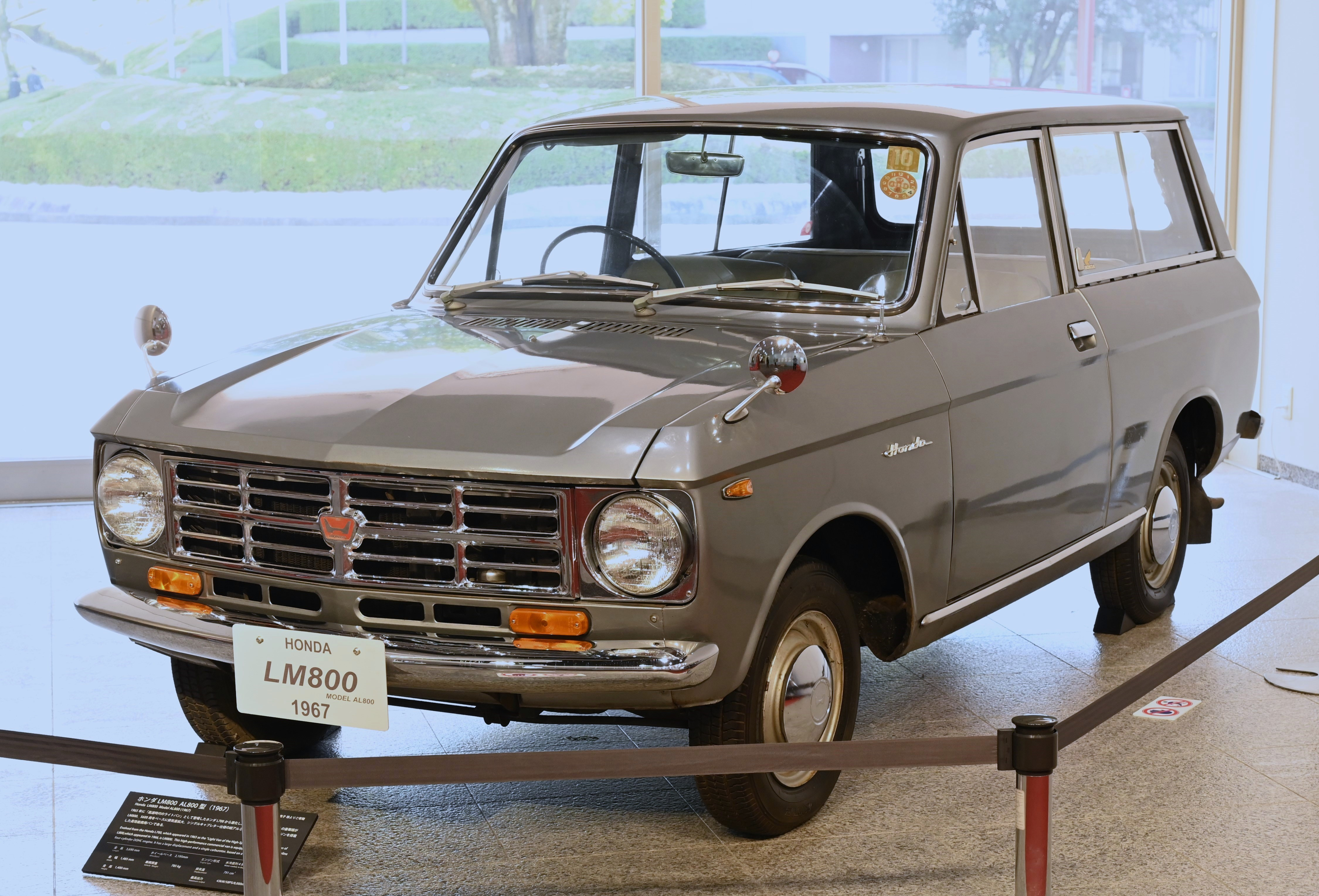
1967 Honda LM800

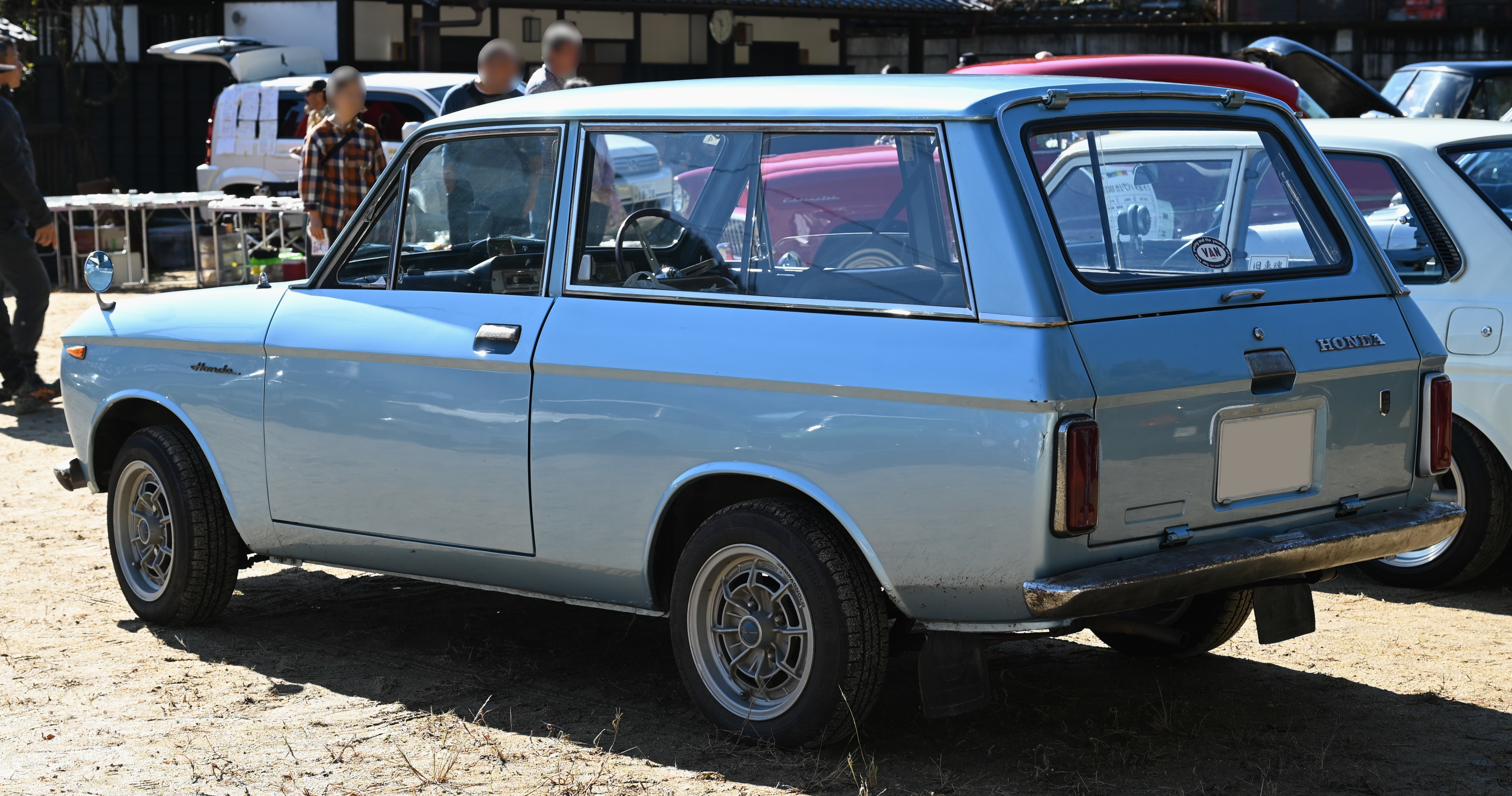
1966 Honda LM800 rear
