= Honda T360 =

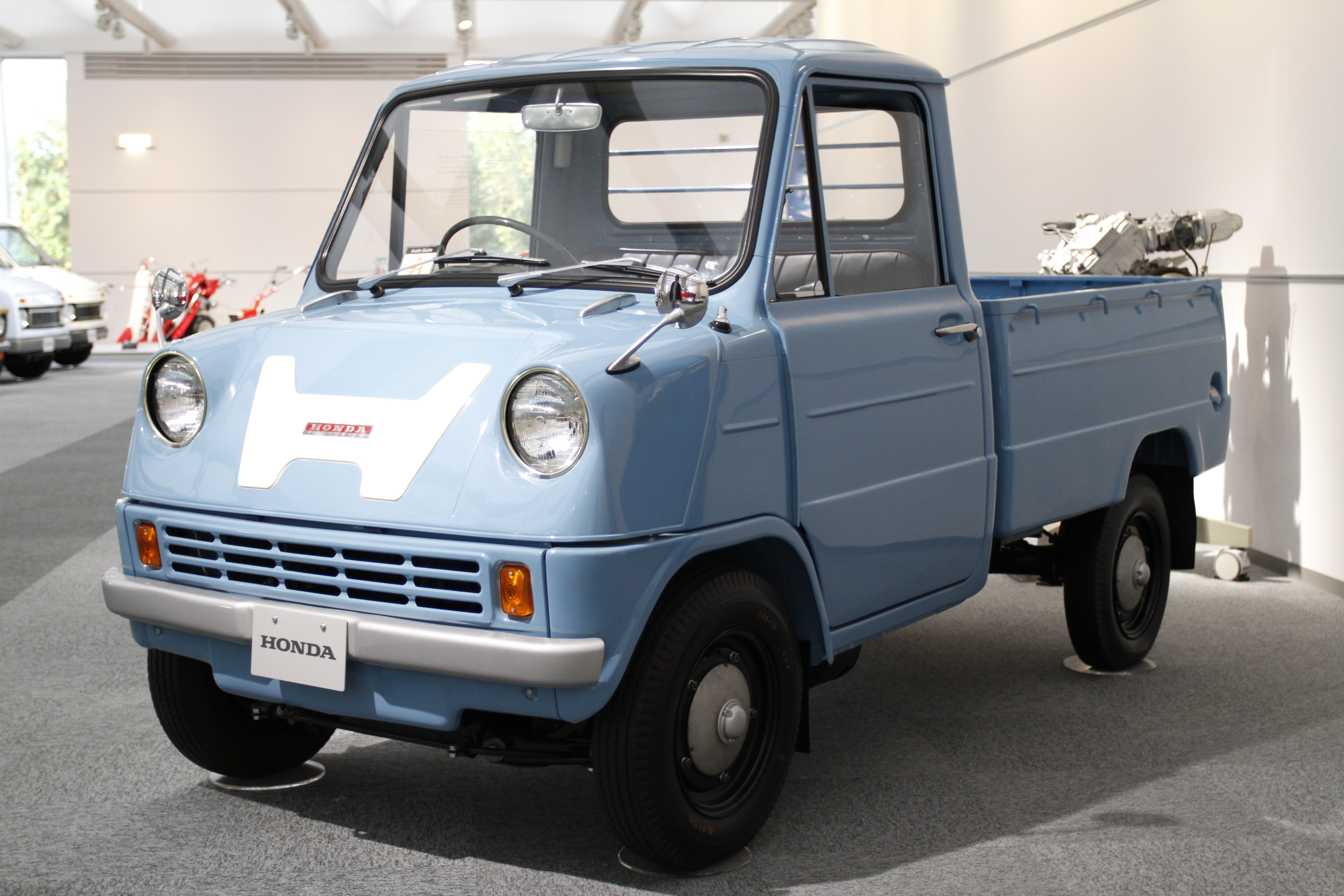

Overview
- Type: Truck
- Manufacturer: Honda
- Also called: Honda T500
- Production: June 1963 – November 1967
- Assembly: Saitama Factory (later Wako Plant), Saitama Prefecture, Japan

Body and chassis
- Class: Kei truck
- Body style: Pickup truck Van
- Layout: FMR layout
- Doors: 2
- Related: Honda S360; Honda S600; Honda L700

Powertrain
- Engine: 356 cc AK250E I4; 531 cc AK280E I4
- Power output: T360: 30 PS (30 hp; 22 kW); T500: 38 PS (37 hp; 28 kW)
- Transmission: 4-speed manual transmission

Dimensions
- Wheelbase: 2,000 mm (78.7 in)
- Length: 2,990 mm (117.7 in)
- Width: 1,295 mm (51.0 in)
- Height: 1,525 mm (60.0 in)

Chronology
- Successor: Honda TN360

The Honda T360 is a pickup truck from Honda. Introduced in June 1963, it was Honda's first production automobile, beating the S500 by four months. There was also a larger-engined version called the T500, mainly sold as an export.

== Overview ==
The T360 used a 356 cc AK250E series DOHC inline-four engine also found in the Honda S360 roadster prototype, with which it also shared the chassis. The mid-mounted engine generated 30 PS (22 kW) at 8,500 rpm, reflecting Honda's experience with motorcycle engines, and propelled the truck to a top speed of 100 km/h (62 mph). The bench seat in the cabin is hinged to allow engine access. The T360 has a wraparound, clamshell-style hood which leaves the headlights in place when opened. A total of 108,920 T360s were produced from 1963 through August 1967, all painted in May Blue.

First shown in September 1964, the similar but somewhat larger T500 used a 38 PS (28 kW) 531 cc version of the engine, excluding it from Japan's kei car class, and was mainly intended for export markets. Its engine delivered power high in the rev range (peak power arrived at 7,500 rpm, with a 9,000 rpm redline), being a slightly downtuned version of the one found in the Honda S500 sports car. Top speed was 105 km/h (65 mph). A total of 10,226 T500s were built from 1964 through November 1967, all painted in Moss Green. Aside from the different color and engine, the T500 has a 20 cm (7.9 in) longer rear overhang, as its overall length was not dictated by kei car regulations. Another minor distinction was the fittings for license plates larger than those of a kei car, as well as a higher 400 kg (882 lb) load capacity.

The T360 was produced as a conventional pickup truck, a flatbed (the T360F), a flatbed with folding sides (the T360H), and a covered van (the T360V). There was also a version of the T360 called the "Snow Crawler", equipped with tracks at the rear. Due to its expense, the Snow Crawler remained a rarity despite its usefulness in parts of northern Japan. The T500 came either with a conventional pickup body or with a folding-side flatbed (the T500F).

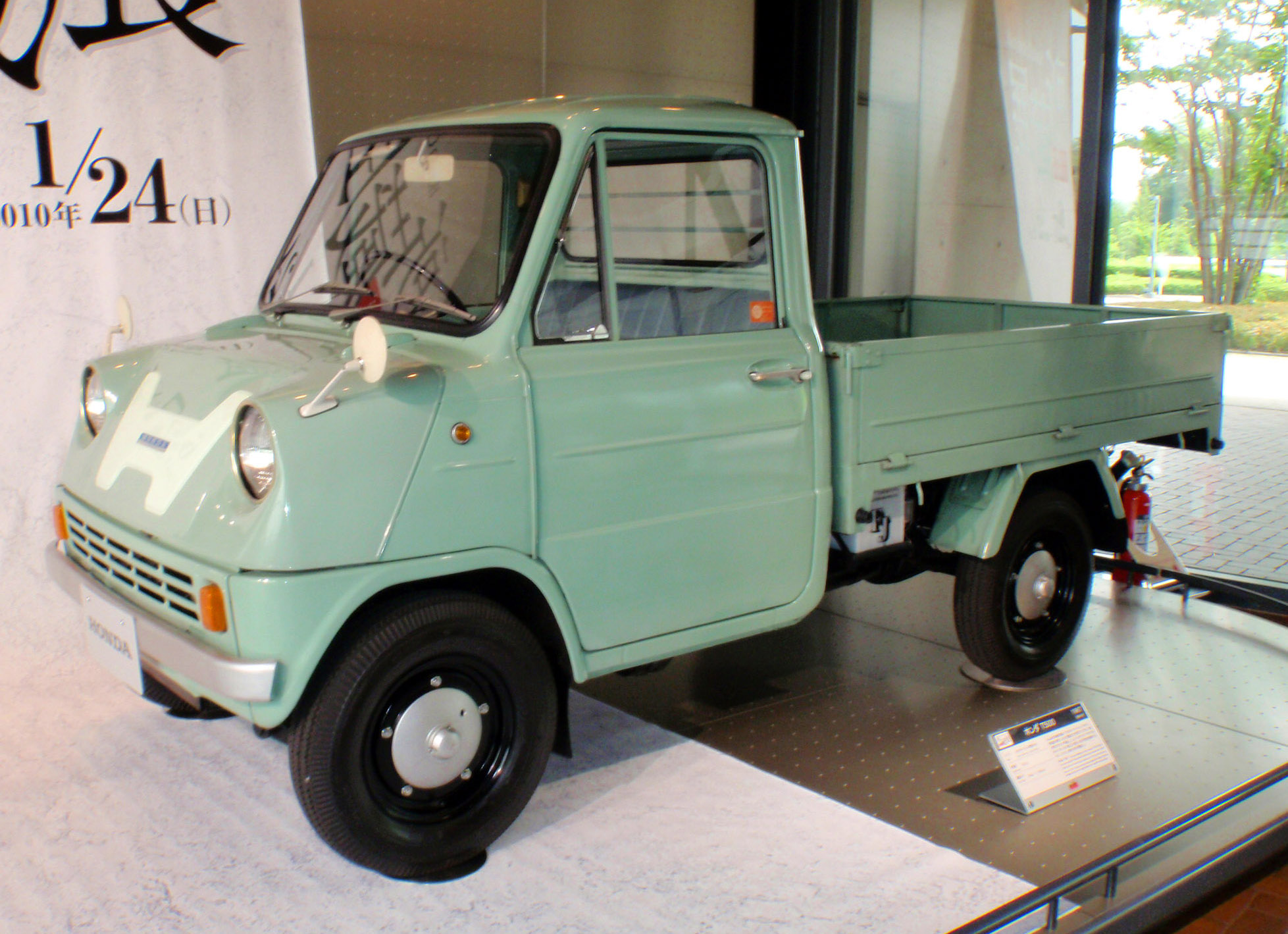
Honda T500F

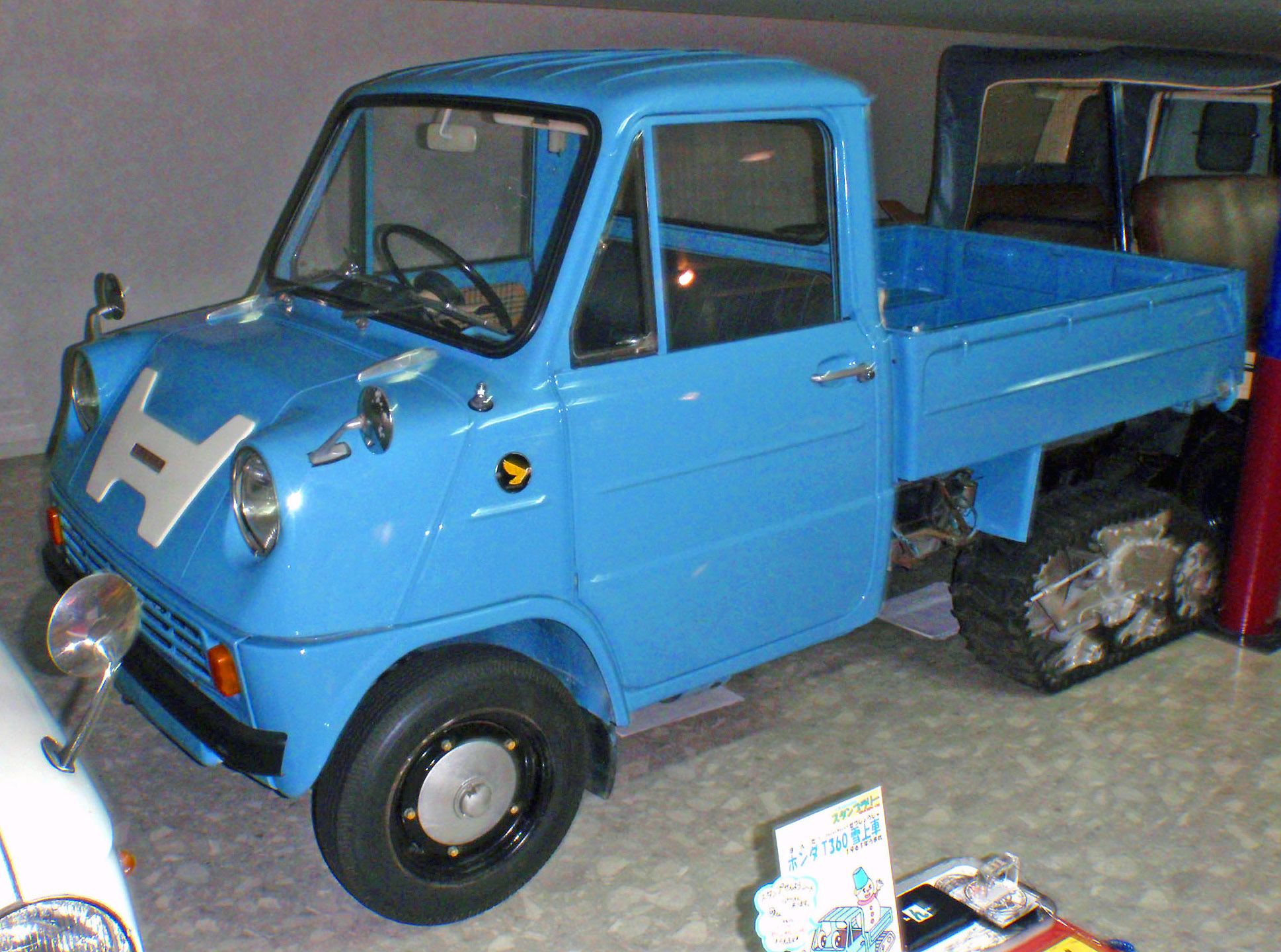
Honda T360 Snow Crawler
