= Honda S800 =

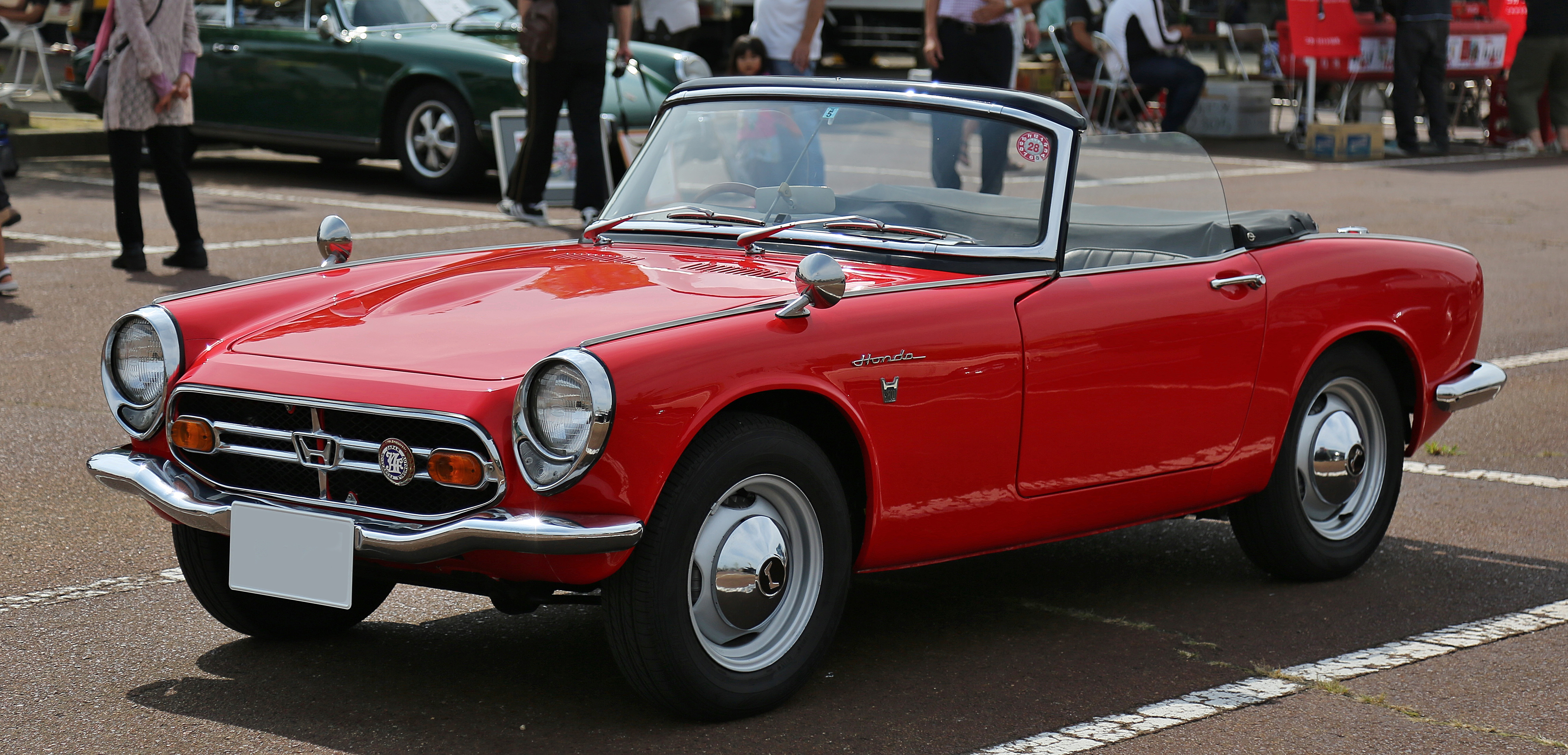
- Honda S800 roadster

Overview
- Manufacturer: Honda
- Production: 1966–1970
- Assembly: Suzuka Plant, Suzuka, Mie, Japan

Body and chassis
- Class: Sports car
- Body style: 2-door roadster 2-door coupe
- Layout: FR layout
- Related: Honda L800; Honda N800

Powertrain
- Engine: 791 cc I4
- Transmission: 4 speed manual all-synchromesh

Dimensions
- Wheelbase: 2,000 mm (78.7 in)
- Length: 3,335 mm (131.3 in)
- Width: 1,400 mm (55.1 in)
- Height: 1,215 mm (47.8 in)
- Curb weight: 782 kg

Chronology
- Predecessor: Honda S600
- Successor: Honda Beat

The S800 is a sports car from Honda. Introduced at the 1965 Tokyo Motor Show, the S800 replaced the successful Honda S600 as the company's image car. With a redline of 8,500 rpm, it is one of the highest-revving sports cars produced for street use. The S800 competed with the Austin-Healey Sprite, MG Midget, Triumph Spitfire, Datsun Fairlady, and Fiat 850 Spider.

== History ==
Like the S600, the S800 was available as either a coupe or roadster, and continued the advanced technology of its predecessors. The 791 cc straight-4 engine produced 70 hp (52 kW) at 8000 rpm, thus making this Honda's first 100 mph (160 km/h) automobile, but still allowing for 35 mpg (6.7 L/100 km). In April 1967 the car was described as the fastest production 1-litre car in the world thanks to its high revving engine (up to 10,000 rpm) and the manufacturer's history of manufacturing powerful relatively low capacity motor-cycle engines.

Early examples continued to use the chain drive and independent suspension in the rear. 752 roadsters and 242 coupés were then produced. After that Honda switched to a conventional drive-shaft, live axle rear end with four radius rods and a Panhard rod. 604 roadsters and 69 coupes were built with this setup before disc brakes replaced the front drums.

In 1967, the S800 became available in Britain. By this time the model had the more conventional drive layout as stated above, with predictable handling and a firm ride. It was also cheaper than the Mini Cooper and Triumph Spitfire, in Britain.

In February 1968, the S800M (aka S800MK2) was introduced with flush mounted interior door handles, side marker lights outside, dual-circuit brakes, lean burn carburetion under the bonnet and safety glass. These changes were made for the American market, but the car was never exported there officially. Production ended in May 1970 with 11,536 S800s produced. Honda did not manufacture another S roadster for nearly thirty years until the release of the S2000 for the 2000 model year.

== Racing ==
At the 1968 12 Hours of Suzuka, the no. #25 S800 campaigned by Racing Service Center (RSC) participated the race. Driven by Kuniomi Nagamatsu and Yoshifumi Kikura, it finished 3rd place overall and achieving 1st place for the GT-1 class.

== Gallery ==
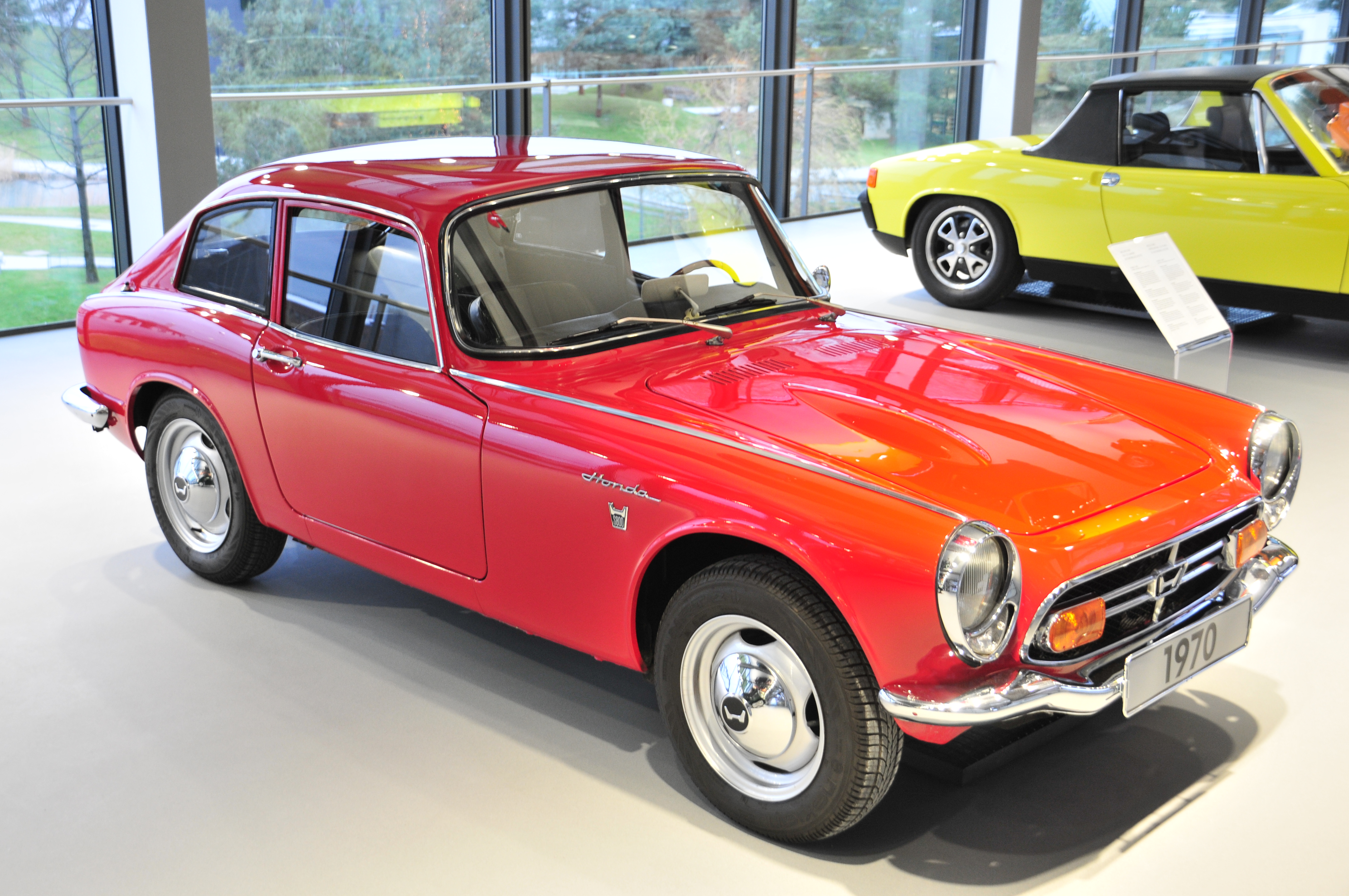
Honda S800 coupe in the ZeitHaus museum

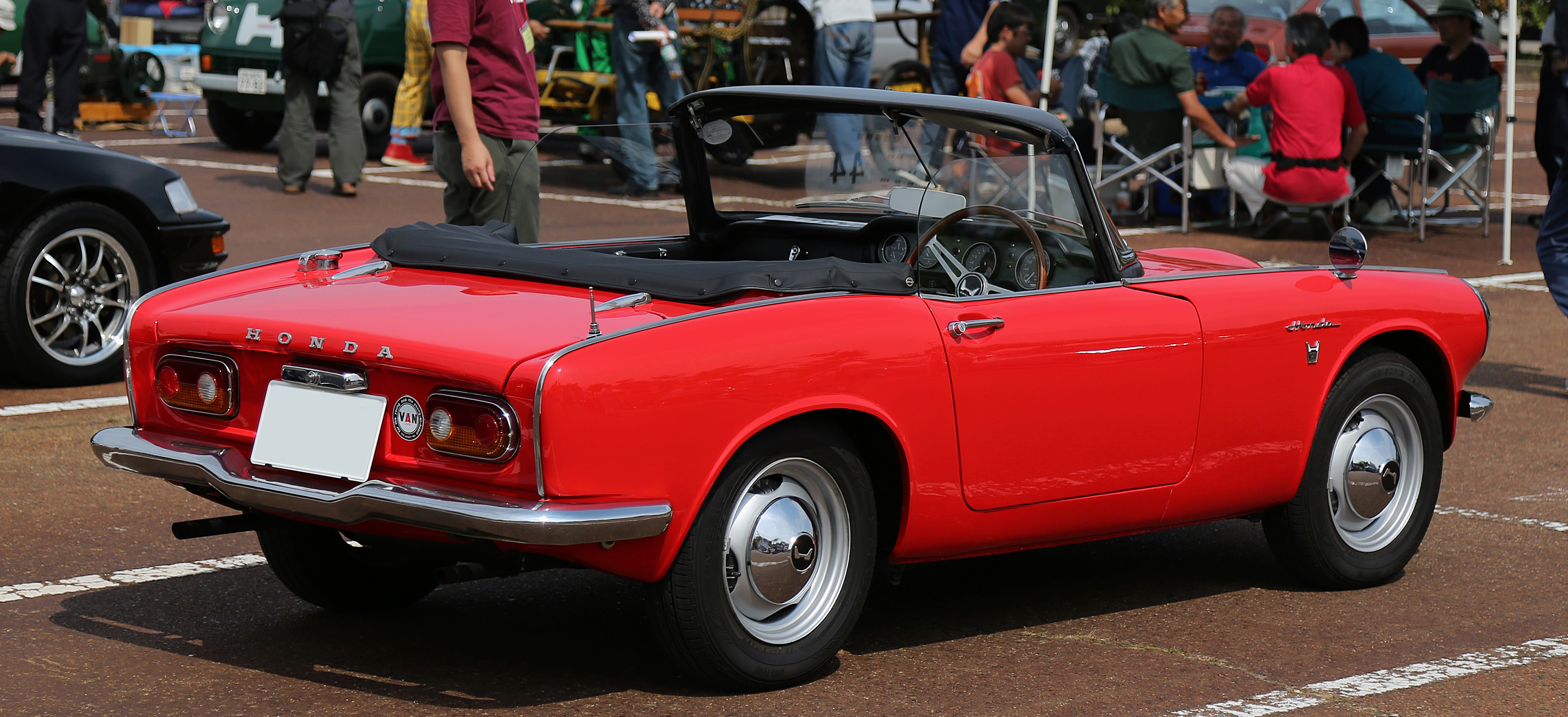
1966 Honda S800 rear

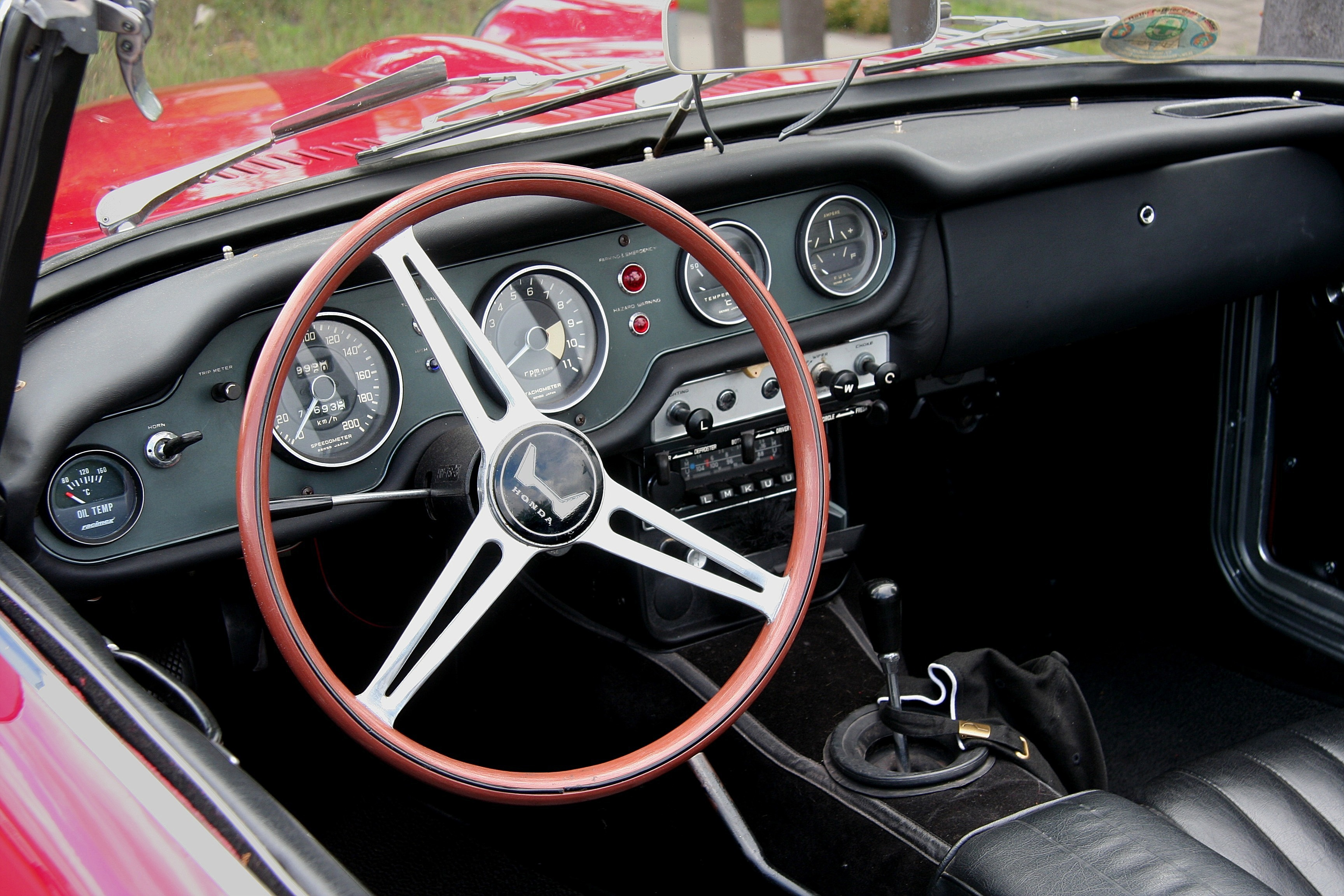
Honda S800 Interior

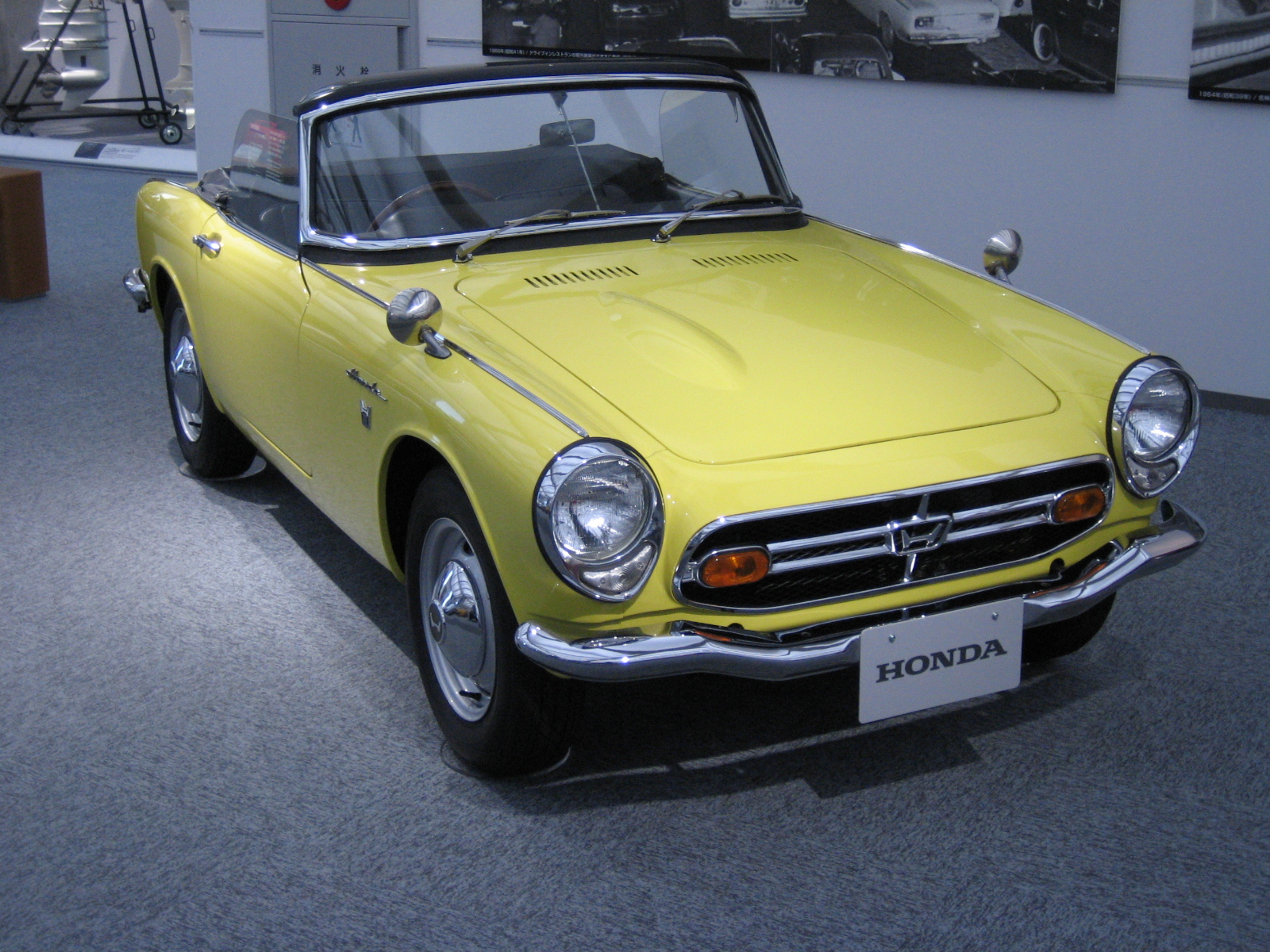
Honda S800 roadster displayed at Honda Collection Hall in Motegi

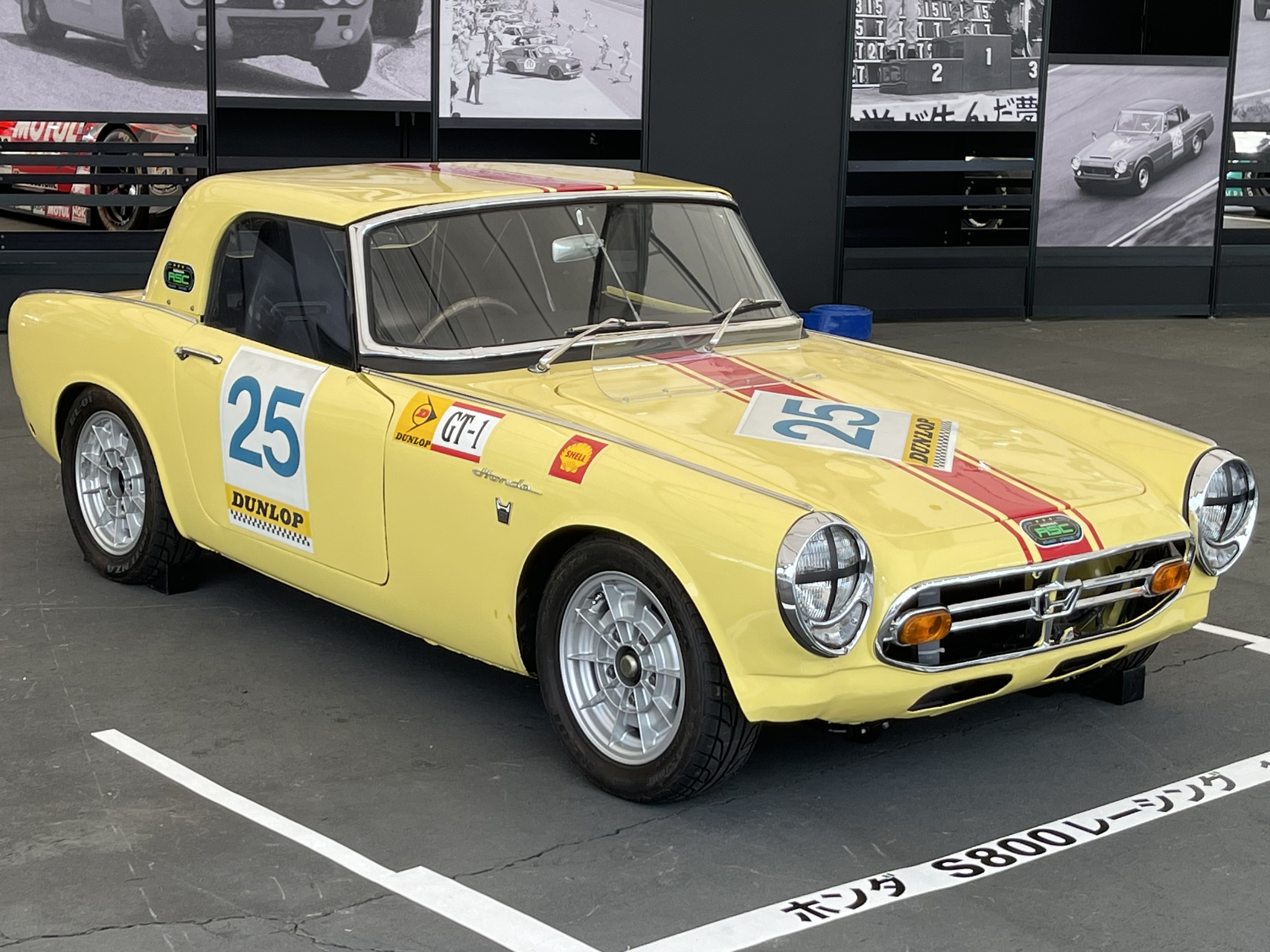
Honda S800 RSC race car
