= Mibot =

Japanese electric microcar

Overview
- Manufacturer: KG Motors
- Production: Expected in April 2026

Body and chassis
- Body style: Microcar
- Layout: Rear-motor, rear-wheel-drive

Powertrain
- Electric motor: 5 kW (0.59 kW continuous) permanent magnet synchronous
- Transmission: Single-speed gear reduction
- Battery: 7.68 kWh LFP
- Electric range: 100 km (62 mi) (estimate)
- Plug-in charging: AC (100–200 V)

Dimensions
- Length: 2,490 mm (98 in)
- Width: 1,130 mm (44 in)
- Height: 1,465 mm (57.7 in)
- Curb weight: 430 kg (950 lb)

The Mibot (stylized in all lowercase; pronounced [mibotto]) is a battery electric microcar to be produced by KG Motors, a startup company based near Hiroshima, Japan.

== History ==
Kusunoki Kazunari, nicknamed "Kussun", used to run an auto parts supplier, until he sold his company in 2018 and began developing the Mibot in 2022, in Higashihiroshima, Hiroshima Prefecture. "KG" stands for Kussun Garage, which is also the former name of Kazunari's YouTube channel.

KG Motors first demonstrated a vehicle, the T-Box concept, at the 2022 Tokyo Motor Show. The T-Box was used as the basis for the Mibot.

As of May 2025, the company has received 3,300 preorders for the car; it expects to produce 10,000 units per year. By contrast, Toyota Motors sold about 2,000 electric vehicles in Japan in all of 2024.

KG Motors delivered its first Mibot on December 30, 2025. The company said at that time that it intends to start full-scale mass production in April 2026.

In January 2026, KG Motors and Idemitsu Kosan signed a formal business agreement, whereby some of Idemitsu's apollostation filling stations in Tokyo and Hiroshima will provide assistance with delivery, registration, insurance, maintenance, and parts for Mibot vehicles.

== Specifications ==
The Mibot has one seat, a range of 100 kilometres (62 mi), and can charge via AC from a Japanese standard 100 V or 200 V outlet, using a J1772 connector. The vehicle has a top speed of 60 kilometres per hour (37 mph). The company is targeting rural areas poorly served by public transportation. The Mibot is priced at 1,000,000 Japanese yen (about US$7,000, as of May 2025) before tax, half the price of Japan's most popular electric vehicle, the Nissan Sakura.

KG Motors designed the Mibot to meet Japan's original minicar (原付ミニカー, gentsuki minikā; lit. 'moped minicar') regulations, which are smaller than current kei car size limits. The car will have a single, rear-mounted motor rated at 6.7 horsepower (5.0 kW), or 0.79 horsepower (0.59 kW) continuous, and a 7.68 kWh lithium iron phosphate battery. The Mibot is 1,465 millimetres (57.7 in) tall, 1,130 millimetres (44 in) wide, and 2,490 millimetres (98 in) long. It includes a heated seat, a touchscreen, an audio system, and air conditioning, and can carry up to 45 kilograms (99 lb) of cargo.
