= Honda Shuttle =

Car model

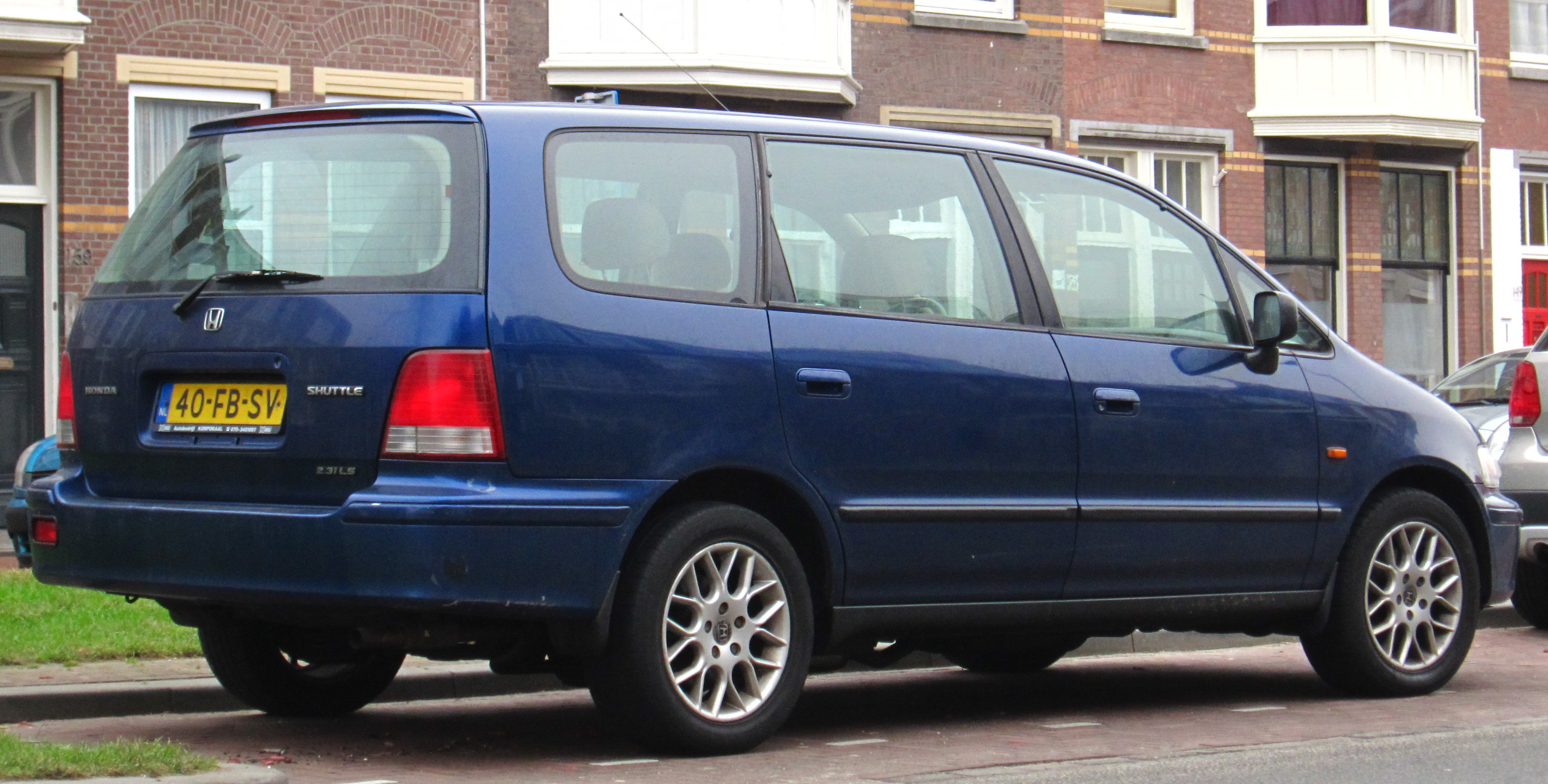
Honda Shuttle (Odyssey)

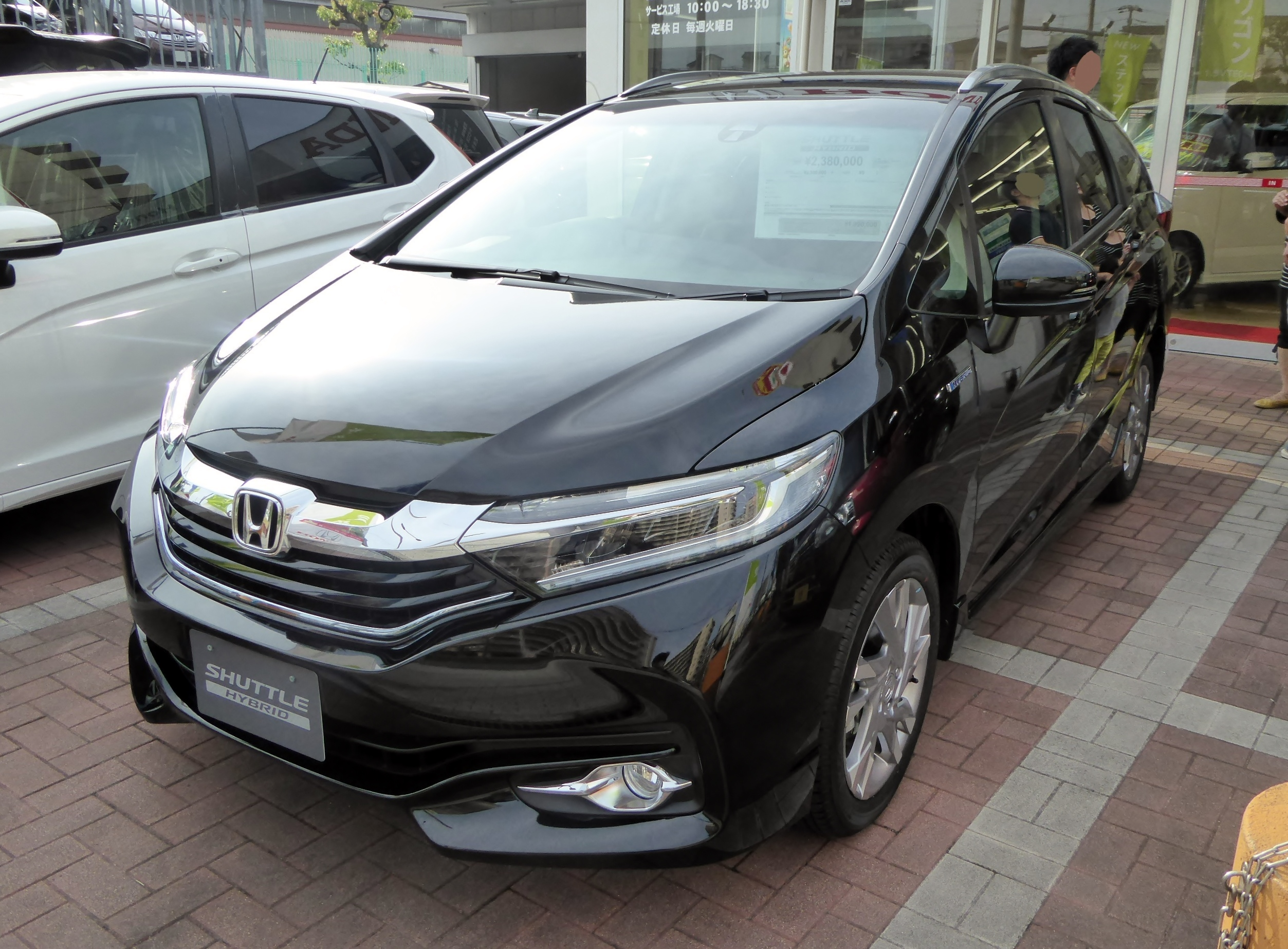
Honda Fit Shuttle

The Honda Shuttle name has been used by the Japanese manufacturer Honda to denote several different motorized vehicles since 1983.

== Automobiles ==
- A five-door wagon released in 1984 which was based on the Honda Civic (third generation) hatchback automobile. The vehicle is known as the Wagon and Wagovan in the US, and the Shuttle in the rest of the world.
- Honda Fit Shuttle – A five-door wagon based on the Fit/Jazz hatchback automobile. The vehicle is known as the Fit in Japan, China, as well as in Americas. It is called the Jazz in Europe, Oceania, the Middle East, Southeast Asia, India, and Africa. It was renamed to Honda Shuttle in second generation.
- A minivan model of the international Honda Odyssey manufactured by Japanese automaker Honda since 1995, marketed as the Shuttle in Europe.

The three models have no relation to each other.
