= Fuji Cabin =

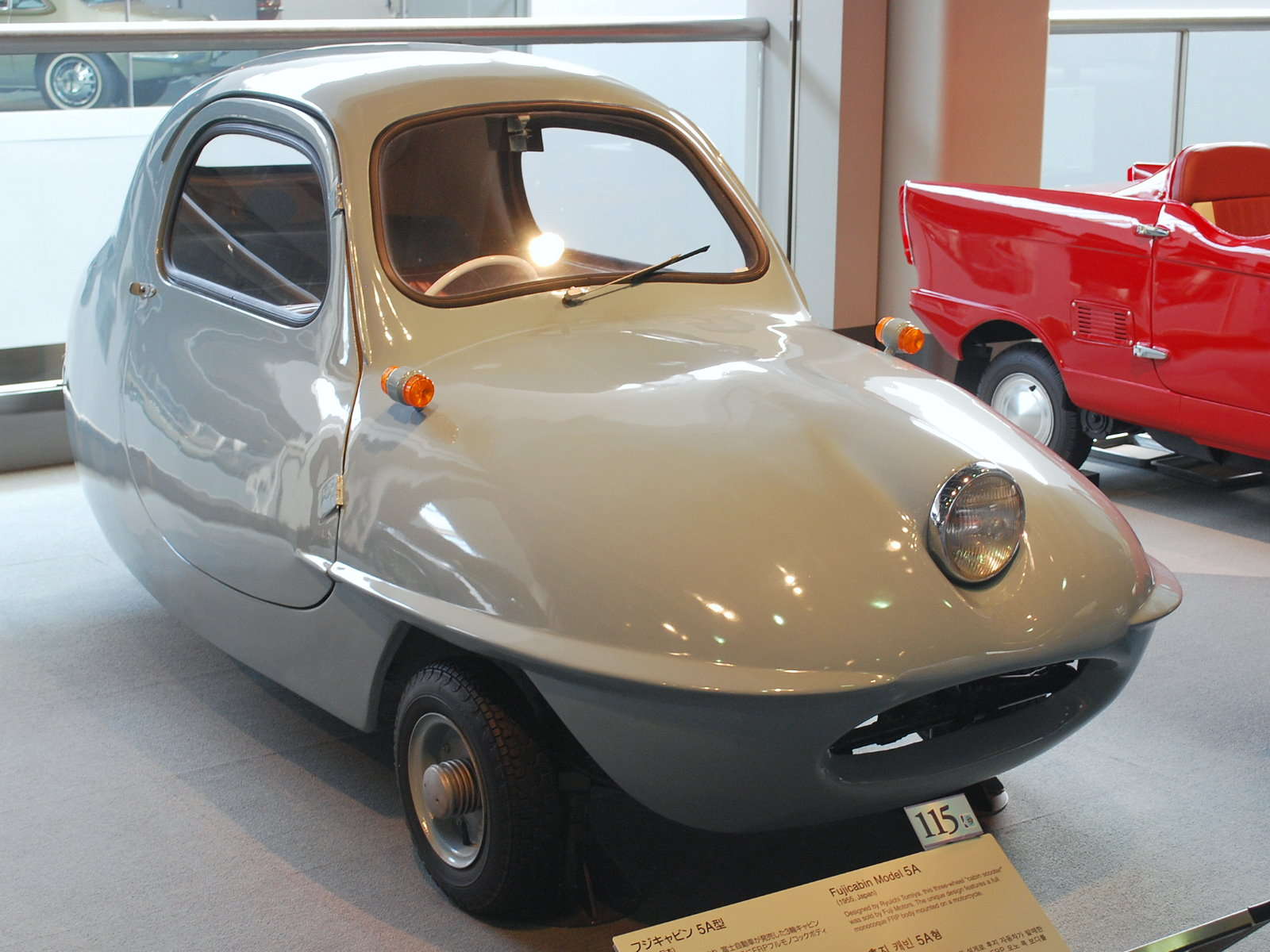

Overview
- Production: 1957–1958; 85 produced

Body and chassis
- Class: Kei car
- Body style: Coupe
- Layout: RR layout (2 front wheels, 1 rear wheel)
- Doors: 2-door

Powertrain
- Engine: 121.7 cc 2-stroke Single Cylinder from Gasuden (Hino Motors)
- Power output: 5.5 PS (4.0 kW; 5.4 hp) @ 5,300 rpm 6.0 lb⋅ft (8.1 N⋅m) @ 2,000 rpm
- Transmission: 3-speed manual

Dimensions
- Wheelbase: 2,000 mm (79 in)
- Length: 2,950 mm (116 in)
- Width: 1,270 mm (50 in)
- Height: 1,250 mm (49 in)
- Kerb weight: 150 kg (331 lb)

The Fuji Cabin is a three-wheeled microcar produced by Fuji Toshuda Motors of Tokyo, Japan, from 1957 until 1958. It was introduced at the Tokyo Motor Show in 1955. The car has two front wheels and one rear. Its two-seater body, with a distinctive single headlamp, is constructed of fibreglass.

The Cabin is powered by an air-cooled single-cylinder 2-stroke 121.7 cc (7.43 cu in) Gasuden engine, producing 5.5 PS (4 kW) and giving the car a top speed of 55–60 km/h (34–37 mph).

One of only a handful of cars of its type in Japan's post-Second World War automobile market, only 85 units were built in spite of its advanced design – partly because of the relatively poor quality of its fibreglass body and partly because of its relatively high price.
