= Honda S360 =

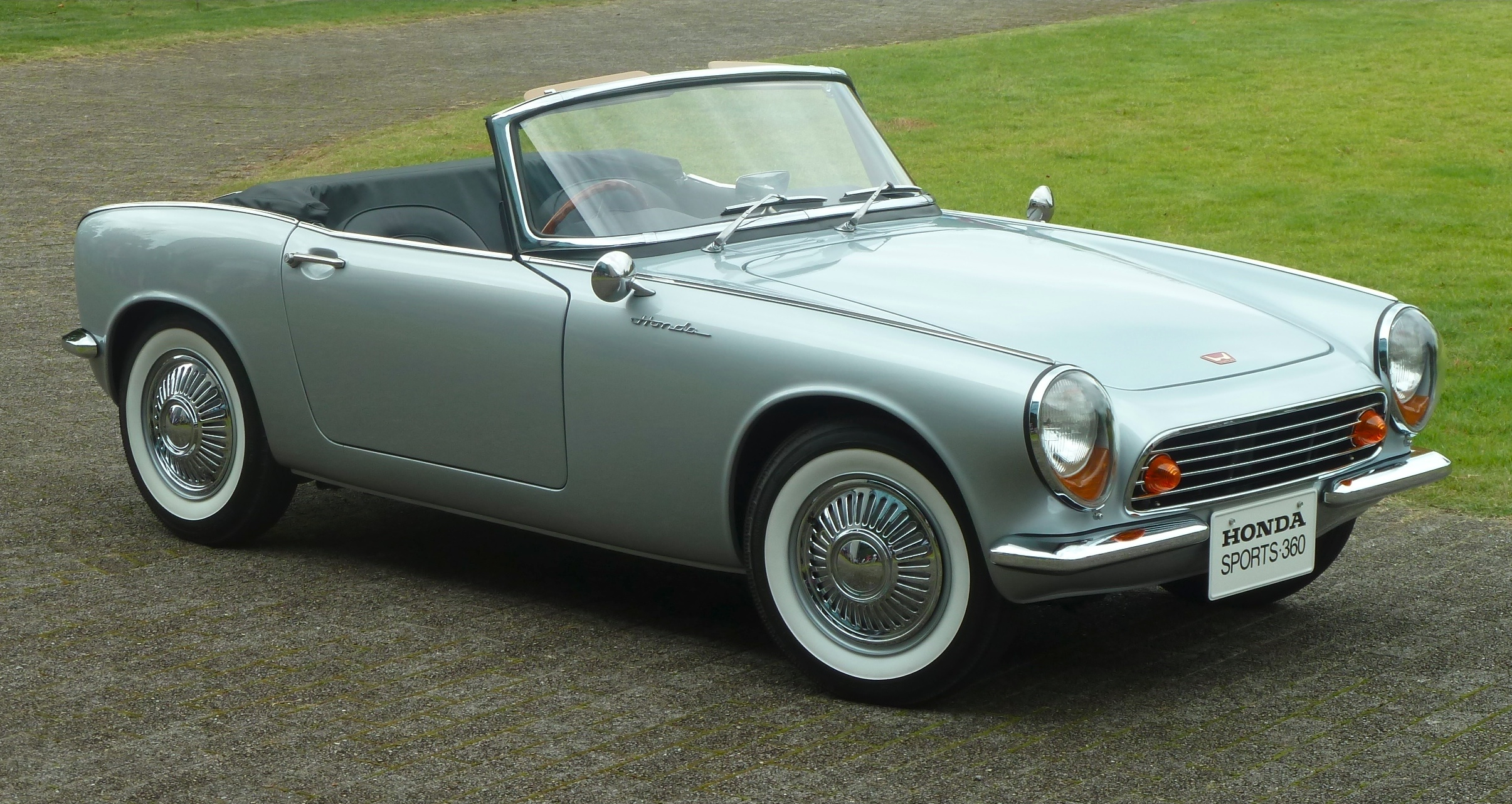

Overview
- Manufacturer: Honda
- Production: 1962
- Assembly: Suzuka Plant, Suzuka, Mie, Japan

Body and chassis
- Class: sports car
- Body style: 2-door roadster
- Layout: FR layout
- Related: Honda T360

Powertrain
- Engine: 356 cc (21.7 cu in) AK250E I4

Chronology
- Successor: Honda S500

The Honda S360 is a prototype sports car with a 360 cc (22 cu in) engine developed by Honda. It was one of the first automobiles created by the company known for their motorcycles. The S360 was unveiled on 5 June 1962 during the 11th Nation Honda Meeting General Assembly held at Suzuka Circuit, but was never put into production. It used a 356 cc AK250E series DOHC inline-four engine shared with the Honda T360 kei truck.

== History ==
In May 1955, the Ministry of International Trade and Industry announced a promotional program called the "People's Car." Their executive summary of the foreseen car was described as, “a four-seater with a top speed of 100 km/h, priced at ¥150,000." It immediately established the engineering target for manufacturers producing passenger cars of the coming era. Eventually several mini passenger models debuted in answer to MITI's proposal, including Suzuki's Suzulight in October 1955 and the Subaru 360 in March 1958.

Honda hired nearly 50 engineers between 1957 and 1958 and created a new research facility all in preparation for car development. Since the Honda corporation had little experience with automobile design most of the engineers on the project, including project manager Yoshio Nakamura, were hired from failing automaker Tokyu Kurogane Industries. While consumers expected Honda to shortly begin automobile production, Soichiro Honda remained somewhat cautious about the matter. In the December 1959 issue of the Honda Company Newsletter (Vol. 50), Honda stated, "we shouldn’t rush into auto production... until we conduct thorough research and are absolutely confident that every requirement has been fulfilled, including the performance of our cars and production facilities." Over the next couple of years, Honda would build and test prototypes rather than try to market automobiles.

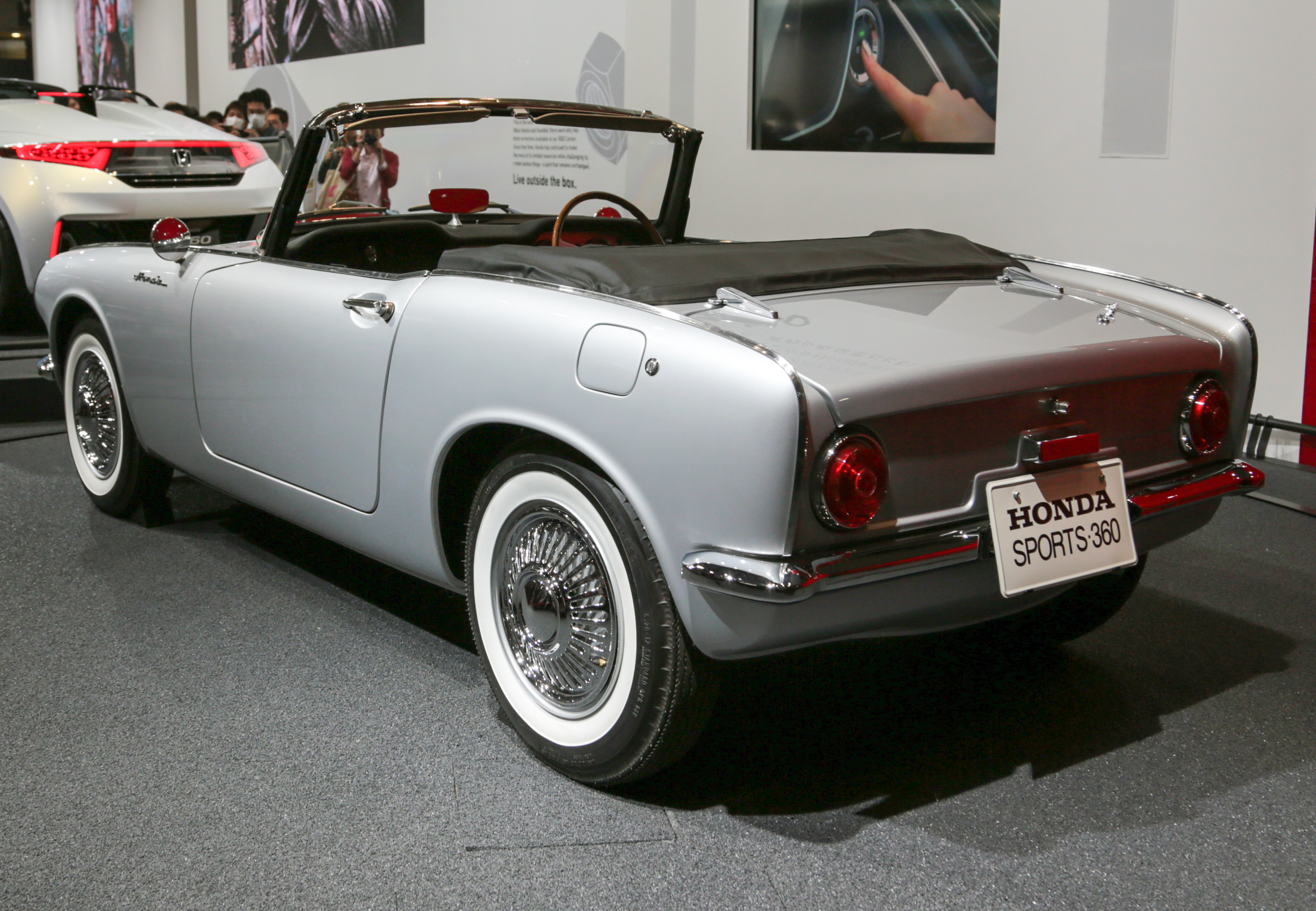
Sports 360 rear view, while on display at the 2013 Tokyo Motor Show

The 11th National Honda Meeting General Assembly was held on 5 June 1962 at Suzuka Circuit. Honda showcased products and conducted test drives throughout the event. The all-new Honda S360 eventually took to the track with Soichiro Honda behind the wheel and Yoshio Nakamura, manager of the development project, in the passenger seat. The S360's entrance impressed the representatives of Honda's franchised dealers who had strongly suggested that Honda manufacture cars so they had products they could sell during the winter months when motorcycle sales declined. Just as Honda had met with success selling motorcycles from bicycle shops, they now planned on selling cars from motorcycle shops. On 25 October 1962 at the 9th Japan National Auto Show, Honda displayed three new automobile models; the S360 and S500 Honda Sports series, and the T360 mini truck.

Despite a very favorable reception at both the Honda Meeting and the Tokyo Motor Show, the S360 never made it to the market because the S500 was a much more marketable car on a global level.
