= List of Honda facilities =

This article provides a list of Honda facilities. Honda's first factory was located in Japan and was completed in 1954.

== Facilities ==
=== Japan ===
- Hamamatsu, Shizuoka
  - The Hamamatsu location was Honda's first factory, and production of motorcycles began April 1954 with production being transferred to the Kumamoto Factory in 2009. The factory currently produces automatic and CVT transmissions & BF20 and BF250 series outboard motors. It attained the international ISO14001 environmental management system certification on March 6, 1998.
- Suzuka, Mie
  - The Suzuka factory is Honda's second factory, and began operations April 1960. It originally produced the Honda Super Cub, followed by the Honda TN360, Honda S500, Honda 1300, Honda N360, Honda Civic, the scooters called Honda Roadpal and Honda Tact, the Honda City, Honda Integra, and the Honda Today. It currently builds the N-Box Slash, N-WGN, N-One, N-Box, N-Van, the Honda Shuttle, and the Honda Fit. The Suzuka Circuit is nearby, operated by Honda under the Mobilityland company, where the Japanese Grand Prix is held every year.
- Sayama, Saitama
  - The Saitama complex is Honda's third factory location, and consists of three factories; Sayama Automobile Plant, Ogawa Plant, and Yorii Automobile Plant.
    - Sayama began operations in 1964 building the Honda L700, and currently builds the Honda Stepwgn, Honda Odyssey (international), Honda Jade, Honda Legend, Honda Accord, Honda Freed, Honda CR-V, and the Honda Fit. The Sayama plant was closed in March 2022 after Honda announced its closure in 2017. Automobile production from Sayama will be consolidated into the Yorii Automobile Plant.
    - Ogawa is an engine plant that provides for the Yorii Automobile plant.
    - Yorii began operations in 2013 and builds the Honda Vezel, Honda Fit, Honda Grace, Honda Shuttle, and the Honda Prelude.
- Mooka, Tochigi
  - The Tochigi Plant is Honda's fourth factory, beginning operations December 1970 and builds powertrain components. In 1990 it exclusively built the Honda NSX. In 1992, the Tochigi plant combined the former Mooka, Takanezawa and Haga plants. The Twin Ring Motegi racing track, which Honda owns, is nearby.
- Kikuchi, Kumamoto
  - The Kumamoto is Honda's fifth factory which began producing motorcycles, ATVs since January 1976. Among the many motorcycles built here are the Honda Goldwing.
- Yokkaichi, Mie
  - The Yachiyo Industry Co., Ltd. operates the Yokkaichi Factory, producing the Honda Acty truck and microvan as of August 1985. All commercial Kei truck for Japanese use as well as the Honda S660, and the Honda Life are built for Honda.

=== India ===
- Gurgaon, Haryana — Motorcycles & Scooters.
- Noida, Uttar Pradesh — Vehicle R&D, Cars, SUVs & Power products.
- Tapukara, Rajasthan — Motorcycles & Cars.
- Tapukara, Rajasthan — Powertrain.
- Narsapura, Karnataka — 2 Wheelers
- Vithalpur, Gujarat — Scooters.

=== United States ===
- Lincoln, Alabama — Honda Odyssey (from 2001), Honda Pilot (from 2003), Honda Ridgeline (from 2005), V6 engines, Honda Accord V-6 (2009–10), Acura MDX (2013–2017), Honda Passport (from 2019).
- Colton, California — Training facility.
- East Liberty, Ohio — Honda Civic Sedan/GX (1995–2005), Honda Element (up to 2011), Honda CR-V (from 2006), Acura CL (1997–1999), Acura RDX (from 2011), Acura MDX (from 2017).
- Marysville, Ohio — Auto — Honda Accord Sedan/Coupe (from 1982), Acura CL (2001–2003), Acura TL (1998–2014), Acura RDX (2007–2011), Acura ILX (2015–2022), Acura TLX (2015–2025), Honda CR-V (from 2018), Acura Integra (from 2023).
- Marysville, Ohio — Performance Manufacturing Center — Acura NSX (2016–2022), Acura MDX PMC Edition (2020), Acura TLX PMC Edition (2020), Acura RDX PMC Edition (2021–2022).
- Marysville, Ohio — Motorcycle — Gold Wing 1100/1200/1500/1800, Valkyrie Rune, VTX 1300/1800, Shadow 1100, Valkyrie (GL1500C), motorcycle engines (Motorcycles are no longer made in USA).
- Anna, Ohio — Engines.
- Raymond, Ohio — Vehicle R&D.
- Russells Point, Ohio — Automatic transmissions, gears and four wheel drive components (about 10% of the plant's electricity is provided by two on-site wind turbines).
- Jeffersonville, Ohio — Battery factory operated by L-H Battery Company, a joint venture between Honda and LG Energy Solution. The facility and its assets were sold by LG in late 2025 and are now completely owned by Honda.
- Torrance, California — Vehicle R&D/design.
- Swepsonville, North Carolina — General purpose engines, Walk-behind lawn mowers, Snow blowers, String trimmers, Water pumps, and Tillers.
- Greensboro, North Carolina — Honda HA-420 HondaJet.
- Burlington, North Carolina — GE Honda HF120 turbofan engine.
- Greensburg, Indiana — Civic Sedan, Acura ILX (2012–14), CR-V, Insight (From 2019).
- Timmonsville, South Carolina — All-terrain vehicles (ATVs) and (Side by Side (UTV)s); Four Trax Recon, Four Trax Foreman, Four Trax Rancher, Four Trax Rincon, Four Trax Rubicon, Sportrax 400EX/250EX, Pioneer 500, Pioneer 700, and Pioneer 1000.
- Tallapoosa, Georgia — Automatic transmissions.

=== Canada ===
- Alliston, Ontario — Plant 1: Civic (coupe and sedan - including all Si for North/South America); Plant 2:Honda CR-V; Civic engines are also produced in Alliston, starting 2013 Japanese CR-V will move to Canada replacing existing Acura MDX production.

=== Mexico ===
- El Salto, Jalisco — Engines, CR-V SUV (50,000 units per year). Honda CR-V stopped in 2016 and Honda HR-V started in 2017.
- Celaya, Guanajuato — Cars, Acura ADX, Honda HR-V and Honda Fit.

=== United Kingdom ===
- Swindon, England, UK (Closed 2021) — Civic SI (USA), Civic SiR (Canada), Civic Type-R, Type-S and standard (Europe, South Africa and Australia) as well as the Honda CR-V for Europe and Africa.
- Honda Racing UK — based in Louth, Lincolnshire.

=== Belgium ===
- Aalst - Homologation Department.
- Ghent - European logistics.

=== Bangladesh ===
- Munshiganj, Bangladesh — Motorcycles & Scooters (Bangladesh Honda Private Limited).

=== Argentina ===
- Campana, Buenos Aires — Motorcycles (Honda Wave, Navi, XR150, XR190, XR250, CB300).

=== Brazil ===
- Manaus, Amazonas — Motorcycles.
- Sumaré, São Paulo (Closed 2021) — Cars (City Sedan, City Hatchback, Civic, HR-V and WR-V).
- Itirapina, São Paulo — Cars (City Sedan, City Hatchback, HR-V and WR-V).

=== China ===
- Guangzhou, Honda Automobile (China) Company — a joint venture with Guangzhou Automobile Industry Group; Honda Jazz for export.
- Wuhan, Dongfeng Honda Automobile — a joint venture with Dongfeng Motor Corporation; Honda CRV for China market and engines for: CRV (2.0 and 2.4l), Civic (1.8l), Spirior (Acura TSX, Euro Accord 2.4l).

=== Colombia ===
- Cali, Valle del Cauca — Motorcycles.

=== Thailand ===
- Prachinburi — Cars and petrol engines for distribution throughout SE Asia and to Australia.

=== Turkey ===
- Gebze — Cars.

=== Malaysia ===
- Malacca — Cars (Honda Malaysia Sdn Bhd).
- Penang — Motorcycle under Boon Siew Honda.

=== Indonesia ===
==== Automobiles ====
- Karawang, West Java (PT Honda Prospect Motor).

==== Motorcycle ====
- Cikarang, Bekasi, West Java (PT Astra Honda Motor).
- Karawang, West Java (PT Astra Honda Motor).
- Kelapa Gading, North Jakarta, Jakarta (PT Astra Honda Motor).
- Sunter, North Jakarta, Jakarta (PT Astra Honda Motor).

=== Philippines ===
- Tanauan, Batangas — Motorcycles.
- Santa Rosa City, Laguna — Cars; Parts and Transmission (to end production in March 2020).
- Valencia, Bukidnon — Motorcycles; Parts and Transmission.

=== Pakistan ===
- Lahore — Atlas Honda Cars (Pakistan) Limited; Manufacturing Cars.
- Lahore — Atlas Honda Power Products (PVT) LTD; Importing & assembling Honda Power Products & Machinery Equipments.
- Lahore — Atlas Honda Limited; Manufacturing Motorcycles.
- Karachi — Atlas Honda Limited; Manufacturing Motorcycles.

=== Taiwan ===
- Taipei — Honda Taiwan Co., Ltd; a wholly owned subsidiary of Honda Motor Co. Ltd.
- Pingtung — Manufacturing plant producing CR-V, HR-V, and Fit.

=== Vietnam ===
- Vĩnh Phúc — Car and motorcycle.

=== France ===
- Ormes, Loiret — Walk-behind lawn mowers, Generators, String trimmers.

=== Italy ===
- Atessa — Motorcycles, General purpose engines.
