= Honda TN360 =

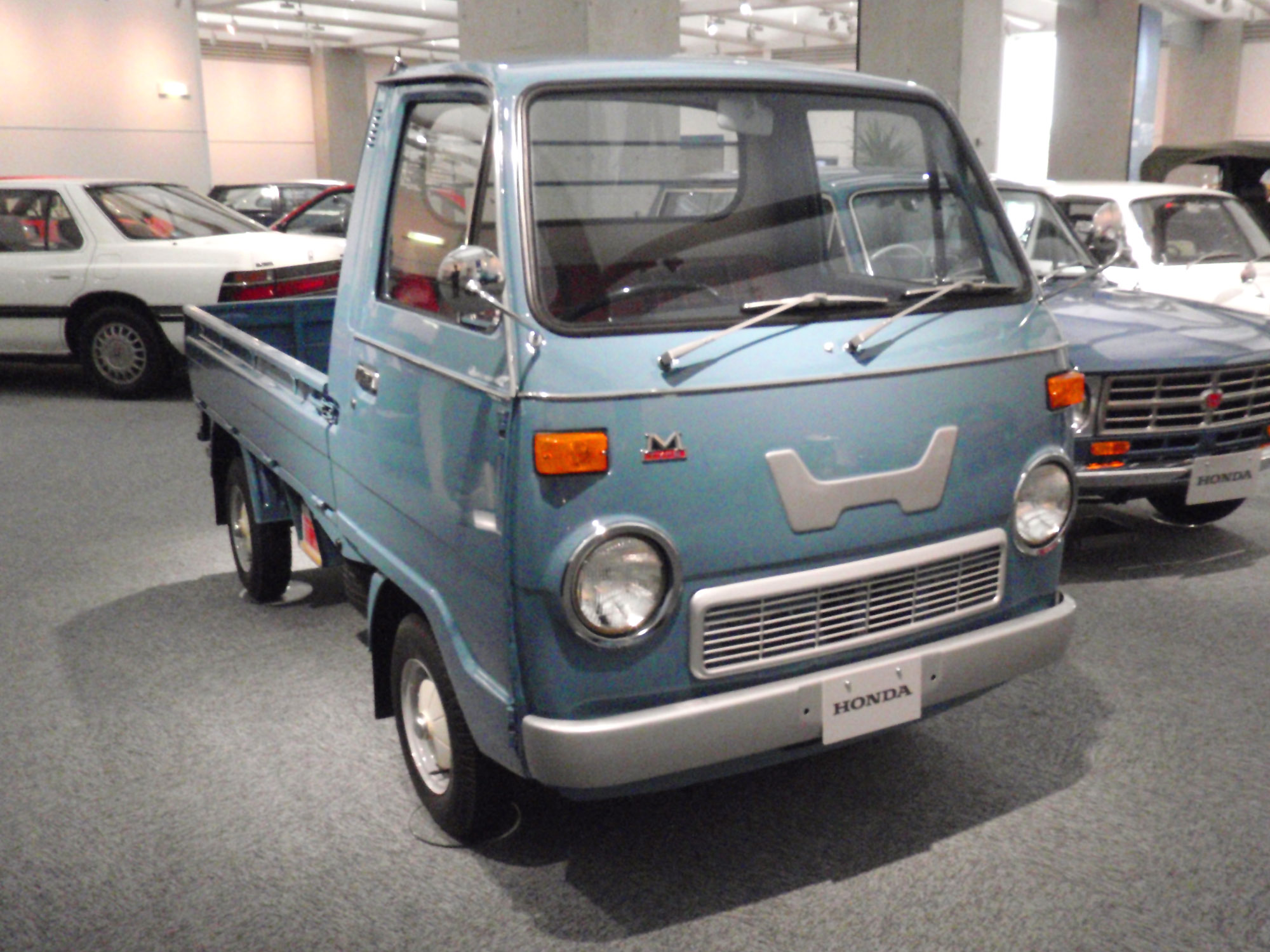

Overview
- Manufacturer: Honda
- Also called: Honda TNIII; Honda TN-V; Honda TN7
- Production: Nov. 1967–1977
- Assembly: Suzuka Plant, Suzuka, Mie, Japan

Body and chassis
- Class: Kei truck
- Body style: 2-door pickup truck
- Related: Honda N360; Honda Life; Honda Vamos

Powertrain
- Engine: 354 cc air-cooled SOHC I2

Dimensions
- Wheelbase: 2,000 mm (78.7 in)
- Length: 2,990 mm (117.7 in)
- Width: 1,295 mm (51.0 in)
- Height: 1,590 mm (62.6 in)
- Curb weight: 500 kg (1,102.3 lb)

Chronology
- Predecessor: Honda T360
- Successor: Honda Acty

The TN360 and its successors in the long running TN series is a cab over pickup truck from Honda, which replaced the T360 in November 1967.

The TN360 uses an air-cooled two-cylinder 354 cc engine with a single overhead camshaft, and was adapted from the Honda CB450 motorcycle. The preceding T360 had been equipped with a very complex twin-cam four-cylinder unit, whereas this new engine (shared with the N360 sedan) was more fitted for mass production. The engine was redesigned to be mounted horizontally, residing midships beneath the load floor.

== TN360 ==
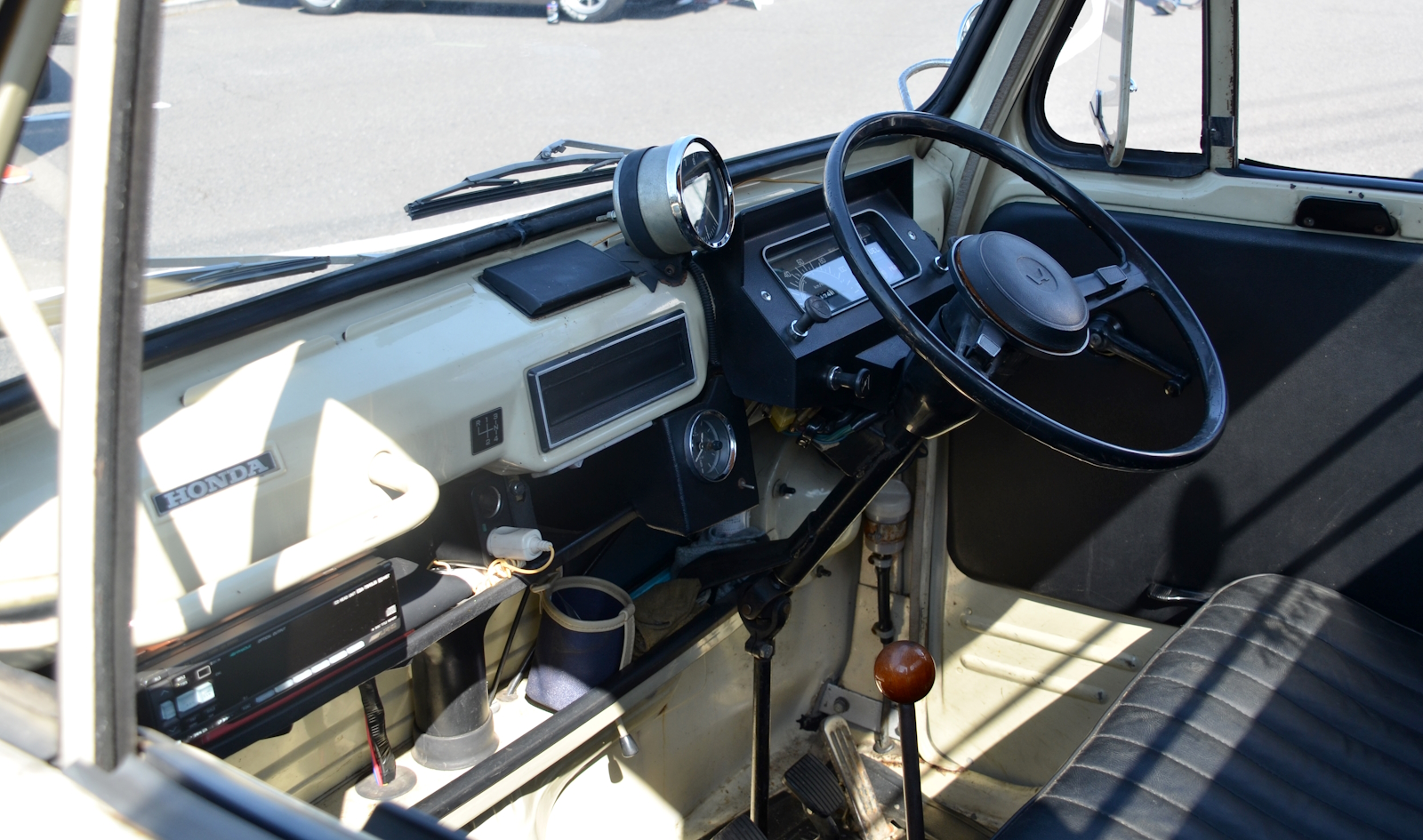
Honda TN360 interior

The TN360 premiered in November 1967 and remained in production unchanged until January 1970. Top speed is 100 km/h (62 mph), the same as for its predecessor. Thanks to a simpler construction, weight dropped considerably: from 610 kg (1,345 lb) for the old T360 to 500 kg (1,102 lb) for the 1967 TN360. Output remained unchanged at 30 PS (22 kW) at 8,000 rpm, but torque increased somewhat to 3.0 kg⋅m (29 N⋅m) at 5,500 rpm and everything occurred in a lower engine speed range. The engine benefited from engineering efforts achieved on the Honda 1300 four cylinder, air-cooled sedan introduced in 1969. The TN also had a considerably tighter turning circle, at 7.6 metres. The only bodywork available was as a drop-side pickup truck.

After only a few months in the market, Honda added a panel van range to the lineup in March 1968, simply a pickup with a permanently covered bed. These were available in four various configurations (with or without sliding side doors, as well as a version with a canvas roof) at a slightly higher price. Due to worse aerodynamics and slightly higher weight, (Note: 550 kg for the basic panel van, 555 kg for the version with a left side sliding door (SD), 570 kg for the one with two sliding doors (WD), and 540 kg for the "Open Van" version.) top speed for the panel vans was only 95 km/h (59 mph), with a max of 90 km/h (56 mph) for the open top version. In 1969, a better equipped DeLuxe version was added to the range.

In November 1969 Honda presented an interesting variation of the TN360: the "Snowler" had removable skis mounted on the front wheels, while the rear wheels were replaced by caterpillar tracks with rubber belts. A similar version of the previous T360 had also been built, and Honda continued to target this very narrow market. The Snowler's top speed was 45 km/h (28 mph), while weight increased to a sturdy 655 kg (1,444 lb). The price was more than 55% higher than that of a regular TN360, (Note: ¥502,000 versus ¥323,000 at the time of introduction. The Snowler kit was also available as a standalone, at ¥185,000.) but Honda was alone in offering a vehicle with these sorts of capabilities at such a comparatively low price. The tracks were also removable, so as to make for a useful trucklet in the summer as well.

== TNIII ==
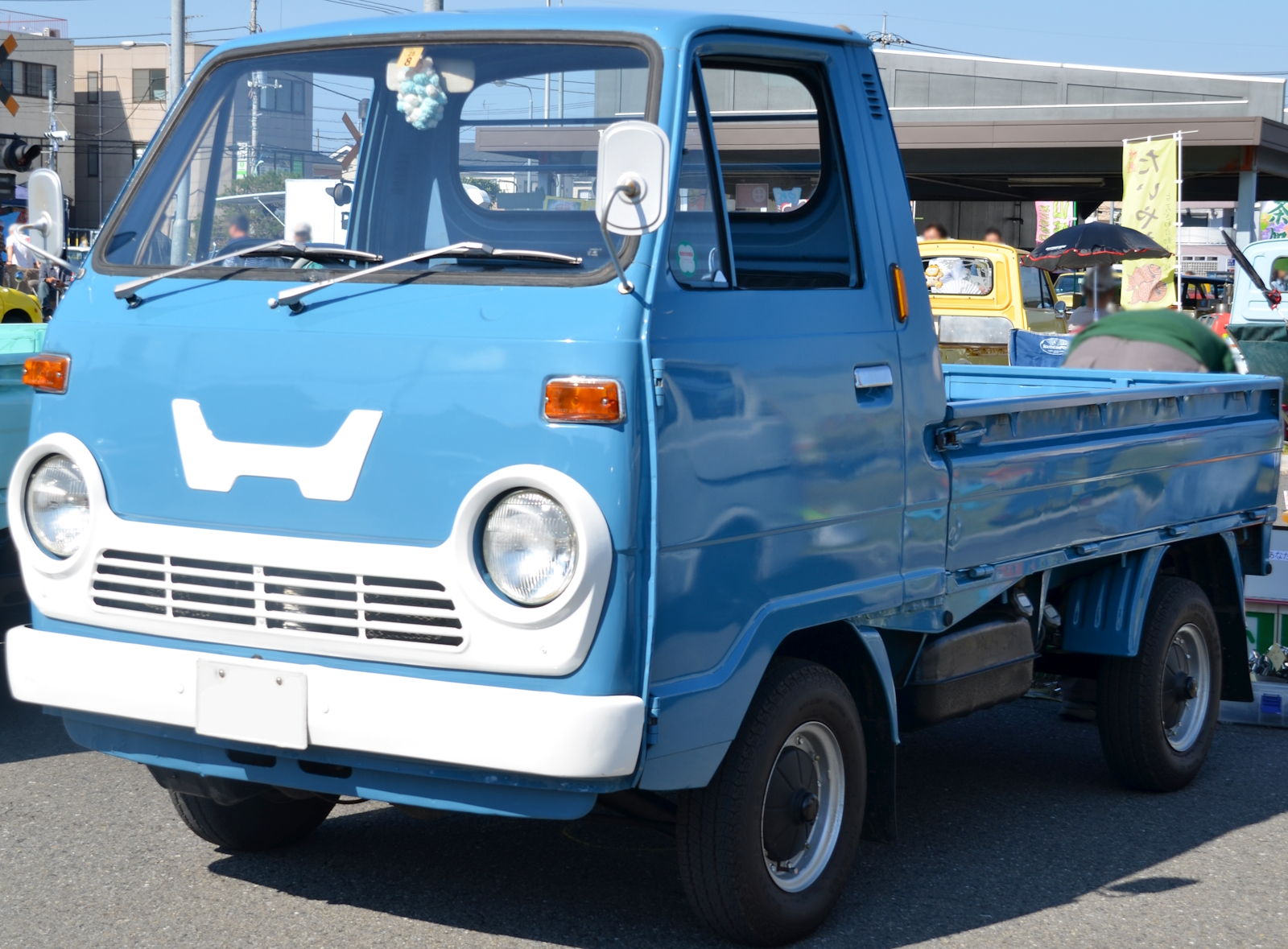
Pre-facelift Honda TNIII

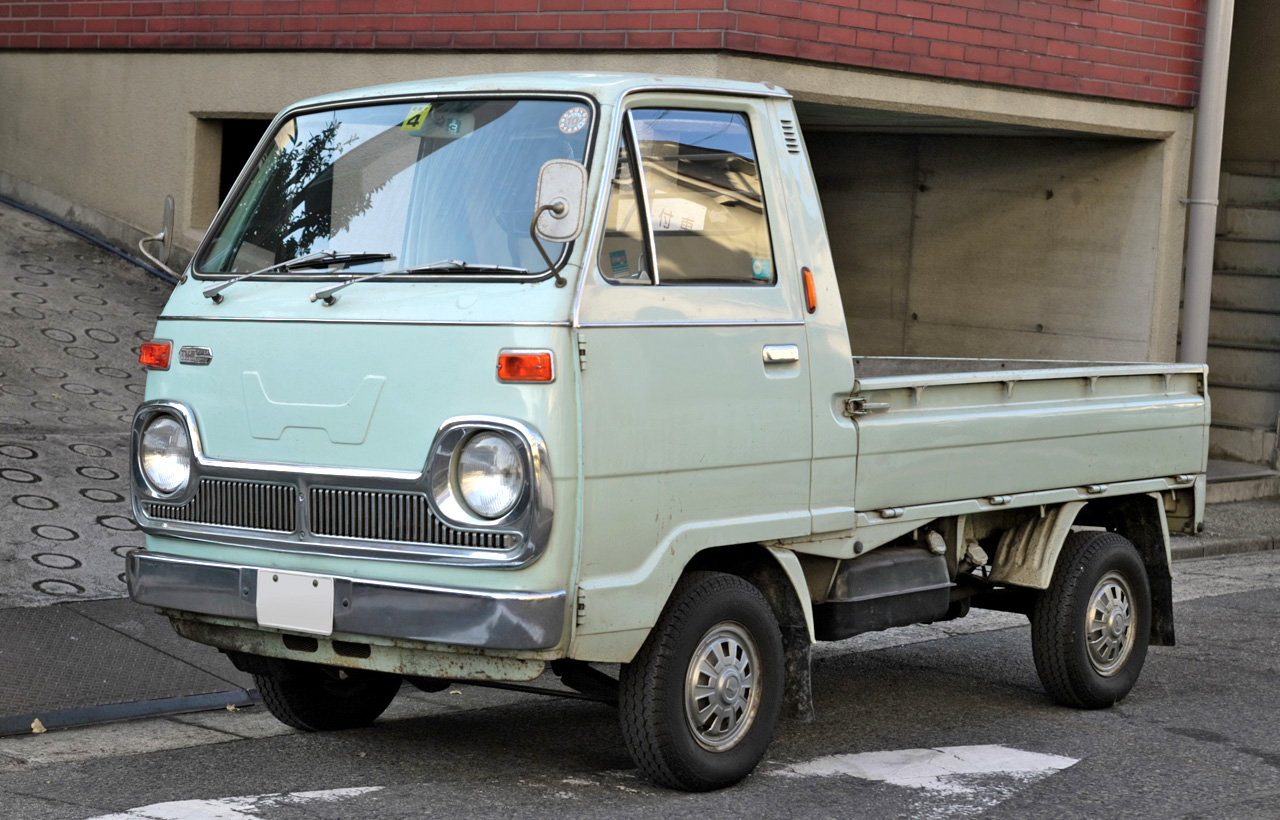
Facelift Honda TNIII

The lightly facelifted Honda TNIII went on sale at the end of January 1970. The differences were limited to a larger, chromed grille, chromed bumpers, larger rear view mirrors, and a slightly more comfortable interior — the large "H" for "Honda" remained. The gearbox, while remaining a four-speed unit, became fully synchronized: otherwise the TNIII remained unchanged from the TN360. The TNIII was introduced simultaneously with the facelifted NIII360 and LNIII360 Van models. The peculiar Honda Vamos leisure vehicle shared most of its underpinnings with the TNIII.

Aside from the facelift, the biggest news was the addition of a Super DeLuxe version (which came equipped with a radio, a cigarette lighter, and white sidewall tires). Total weight for the base model truck crept up to 540 kg (1,190 lb). The Snowler and Panel Van models continued to be available, making for a total of 28 various models. The range grew further in July 1970, when a pickup version with fixed sides and a rear gate (instead of the three-way fold down beds used so far) was added.

In April 1971, the engine was upgraded so as to make it more quiet.

== TN-V ==
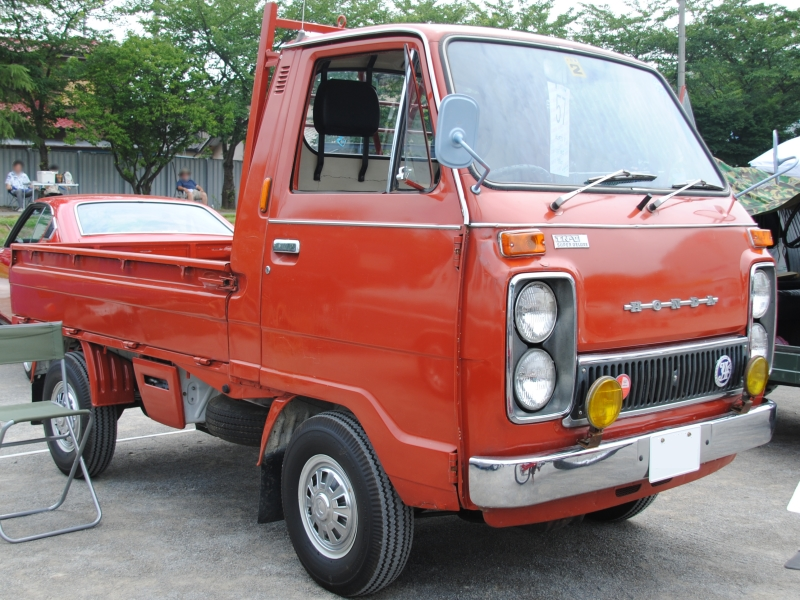
Honda TN-V Super DeLuxe

The TN-V, presented in June 1972, was the next facelift. The TN-V received new sheetmetal in front, with a big toothy grille and twin, vertically stacked headlights. The oversized "H" on the front was replaced by "Honda" lettering. It was a commercial companion to the Honda Life kei truck. It had a lower compression engine, necessary to meet tighter emissions standards, and only had 27 PS (20 kW) at a considerably less peaky 7,000 rpm. The modified engine was now also able to run on unleaded petrol, thanks to alloy valve guides and seats. Torque figures stayed unchanged and the weight of the base model also remained at 540 kg (1,190 lb). The TN-V also had a standard drivers' seatbelt while the turn signals were now made separate from the rear lights.

In August 1973, the TN-V was again modified to meet new safety standard requirements.

== TN7 ==
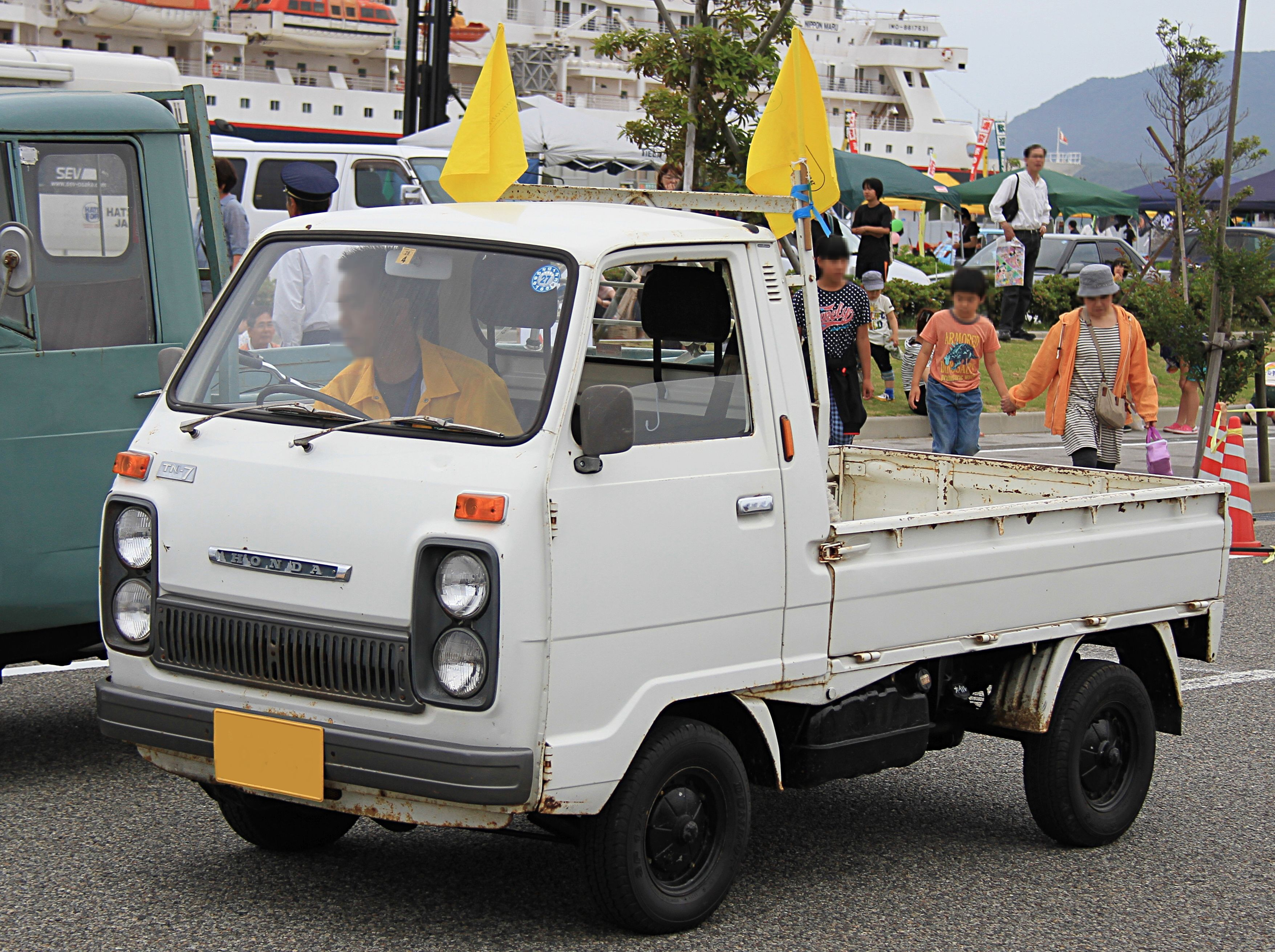
Honda TN-7

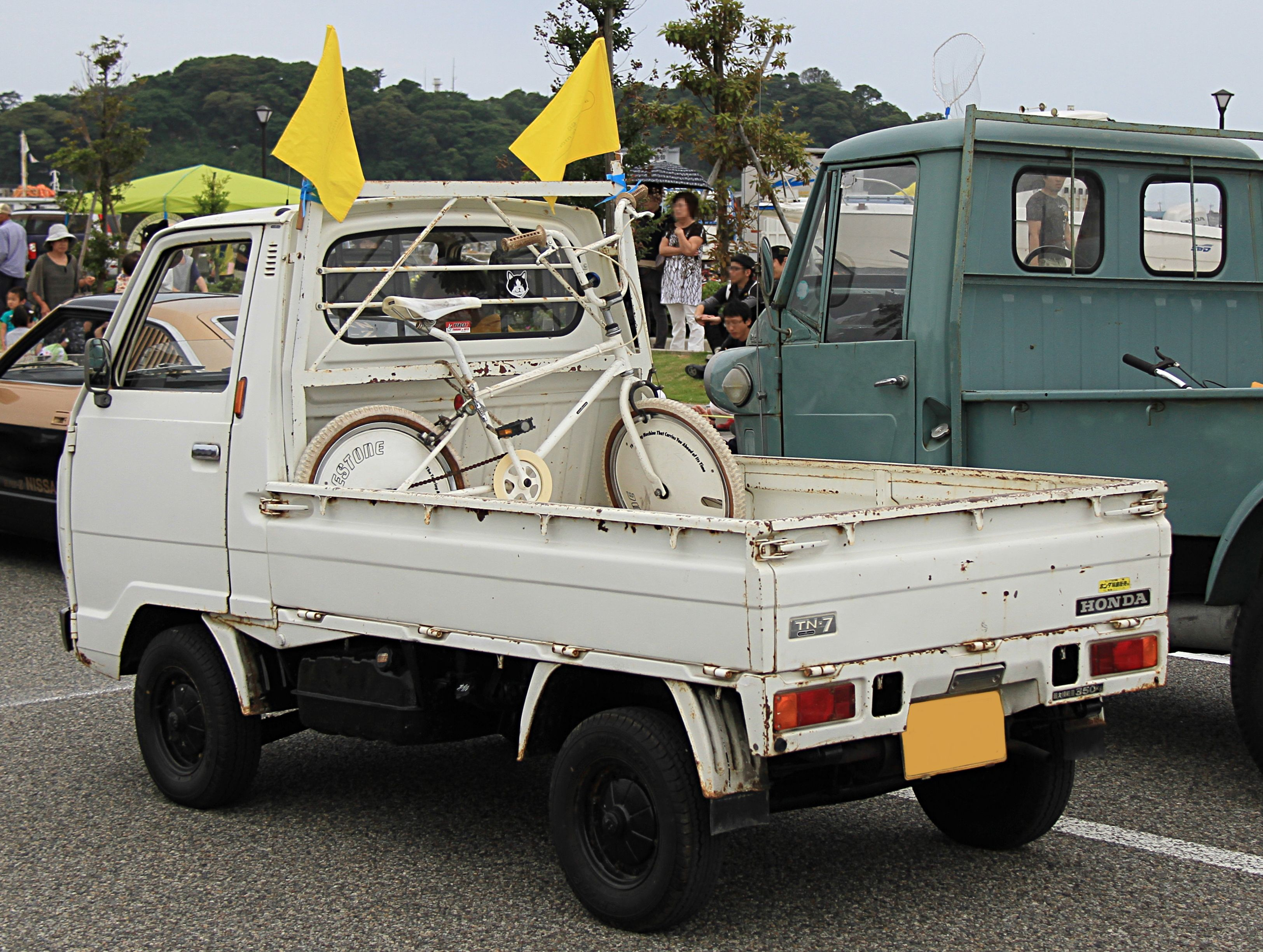
Honda TN-7 rear

In August 1975 the TN7 was presented. The main difference was that the engine could meet the tighter yet 1975 emissions requirements. Visually it was near identical to its predecessor, the changes being limited to bumper rubbing strips and black rather than dark gray plastic trim in places. It was somewhat heavier than the TN-V (555 kg (1,224 lb)) due to the emissions equipment. A passenger side seatbelt also became standard fitment, as did a powered window washer. Production came to an end in July 1977, after about 700,000 TN360s had been built, when Honda presented the larger TN Acty. The 545 cc TN Acty belatedly took full advantage of the new larger kei car standards which had taken effect on January 1, 1976. The Acty range retained the "TN" label until being redesigned in 1988. Incidentally, the TN7 was the last air-cooled car to be produced in Japan.
