= Honda S600 =

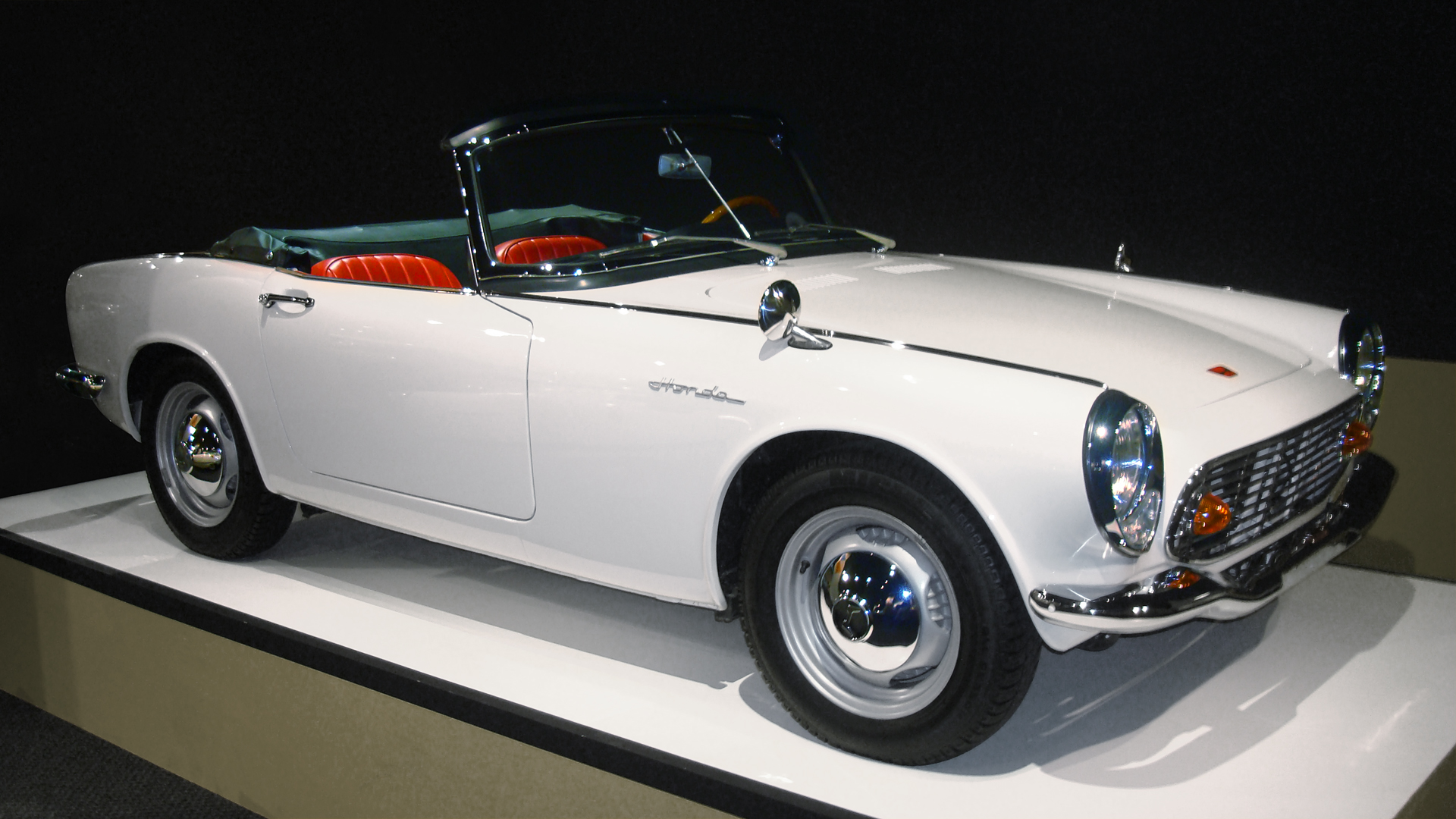

Overview
- Manufacturer: Honda
- Production: 1964–1966
- Assembly: Suzuka Plant, Suzuka, Mie, Japan

Body and chassis
- Class: Sports car
- Body style: 2-door roadster 2-door coupe
- Related: Honda L700

Powertrain
- Transmission: 4-speed manual 5-speed manual

Dimensions
- Wheelbase: 2,000 mm (78.7 in)
- Length: 3,300 mm (129.9 in)
- Width: 1,400 mm (55.1 in)
- Height: 1,200 mm (47.2 in)
- Curb weight: 715 kg (1,576 lb)

Chronology
- Predecessor: Honda S500
- Successor: Honda S800

The Honda S600 is an automobile manufactured by Honda. It was launched in March 1964. Available as a roadster, bearing strong resemblance to the Honda S500, and as a fastback coupé, introduced in March 1965, the S600 was the first Honda available in two trim levels. During its production run up to 1966, the model styling would remain pretty much the same, with the most notable changes coming to the front grille, bumper, and headlights.

== Specifications ==
Powered by a DOHC, water-cooled, four-cylinder inline engine with four Keihin carburetors, the engine capacity was increased to 606 cc from the S500's 531 cc. The engine produced 57 hp (43 kW) at 8,500 rpm and had a top speed of 90 mph (140 km/h). With the convertible weighing in at 1,576 lb (715 kg), the extra sheet metal of the coupe added 33 lb (15 kg) to the overall weight. A four speed manual transmission drove the rear wheels via a hypoid differential outputting to chain final drives for each rear wheel. Each wheel was driven by either single or dual chains (depending on production date), contained in a pivoting, sealed case with oil bath lubrication and adjustable tensioners. These pivoting chain cases functioned as trailing arms for the fully independent, coil-sprung rear suspension. The front suspension was also independent, with a-arms, longitudinal torsion bar springs and rack-and-pinion steering. The S600 was equipped with 13" wheels and finned aluminum drum brakes.

== Production history ==
The S600 was the first mass-marketed Honda car. First offered only in right-hand drive, it soon became available in left-hand drive to appeal to export markets. There were a few pre-production S500s manufactured in left-hand drive, two or three even being shown in some early sales brochures. The S600 was the first Honda car sold in Europe. It was never officially sold in the United States, although a small number were imported by individual owners via Canada, Okinawa or Guam.

Both the S600 roadster and coupé were available in standard trim and a special, upgraded package called the SM600 which included, among other items, special paint colors, exclusive badging, a standard radio and speaker, a special antenna in the passenger side sun visor, standard reversing lights, a standard cigarette lighter, a standard heater, better-cushioned seats, and a detachable seat track for quick removal of the passenger seat.

Honda built 3,912 roadsters in 1964, with production climbing to 7,261 convertibles and 1,519 coupes in 1965. Production dropped off in 1966 (as they were shifting to the S800) with only 111 roadsters and 281 coupes, giving tallies of 11,284 convertibles and 1,800 coupes for the 3-year span.

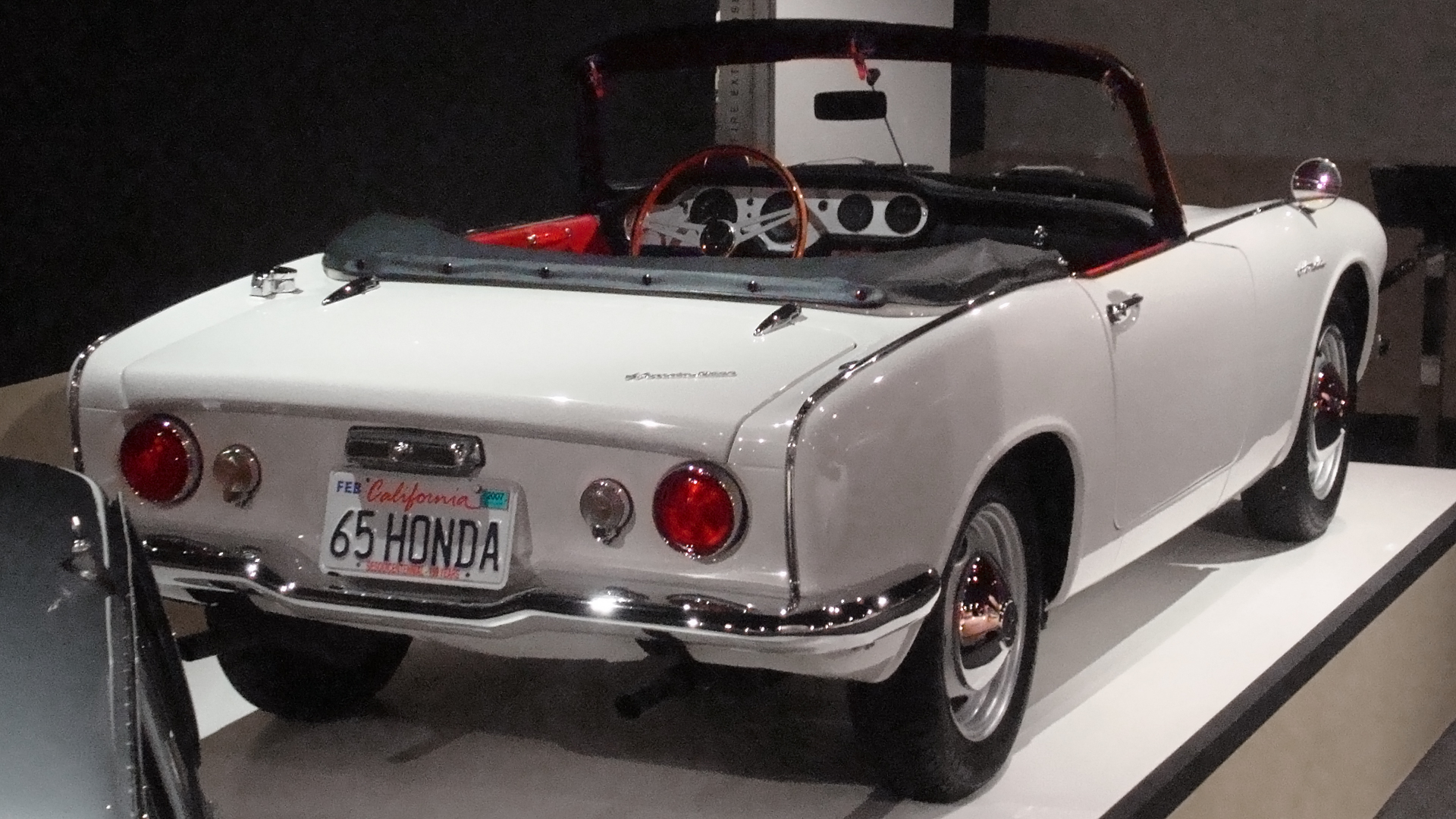
Honda S600 (rear) at the Petersen Automotive Museum

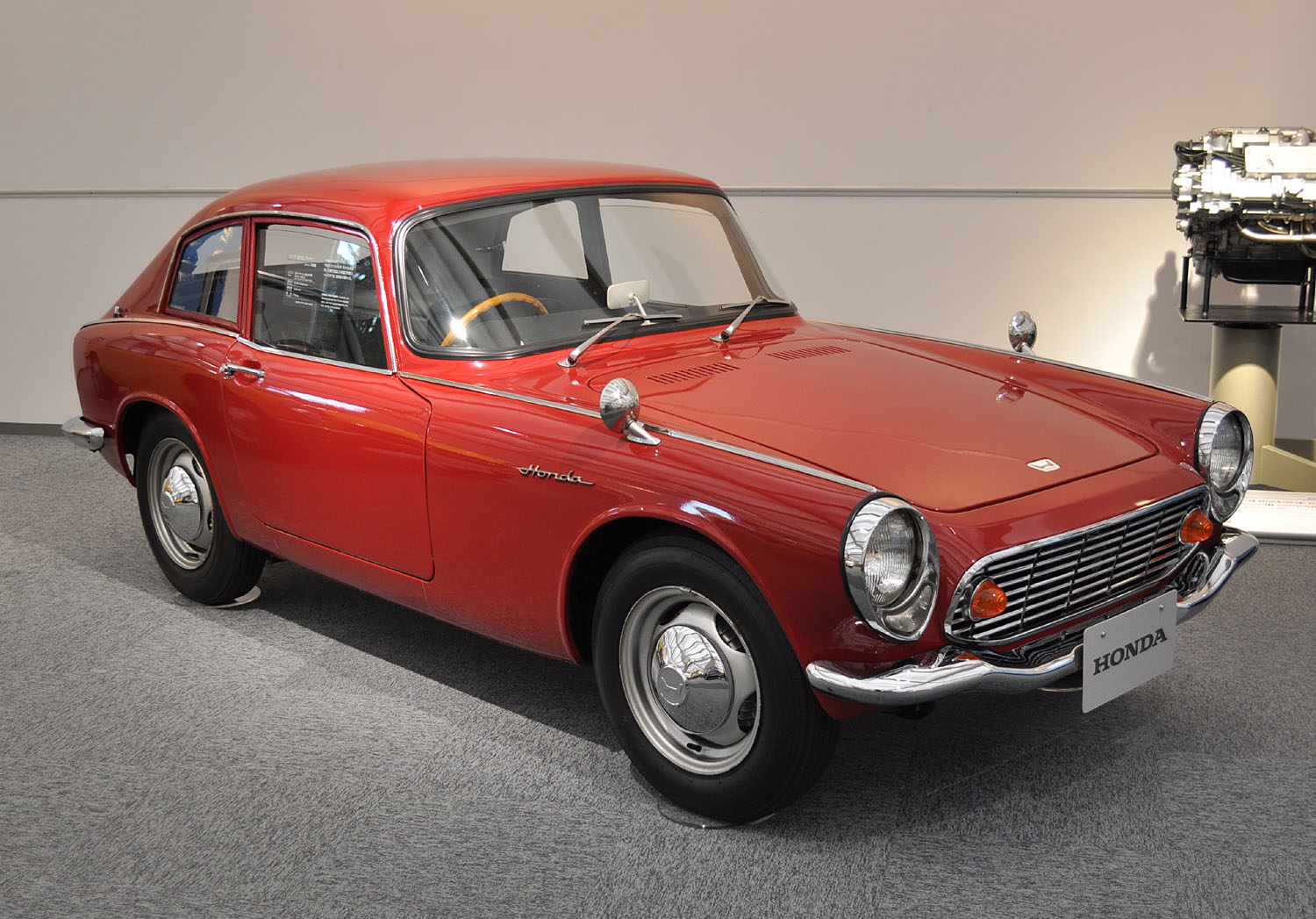
Honda S600 Coupe

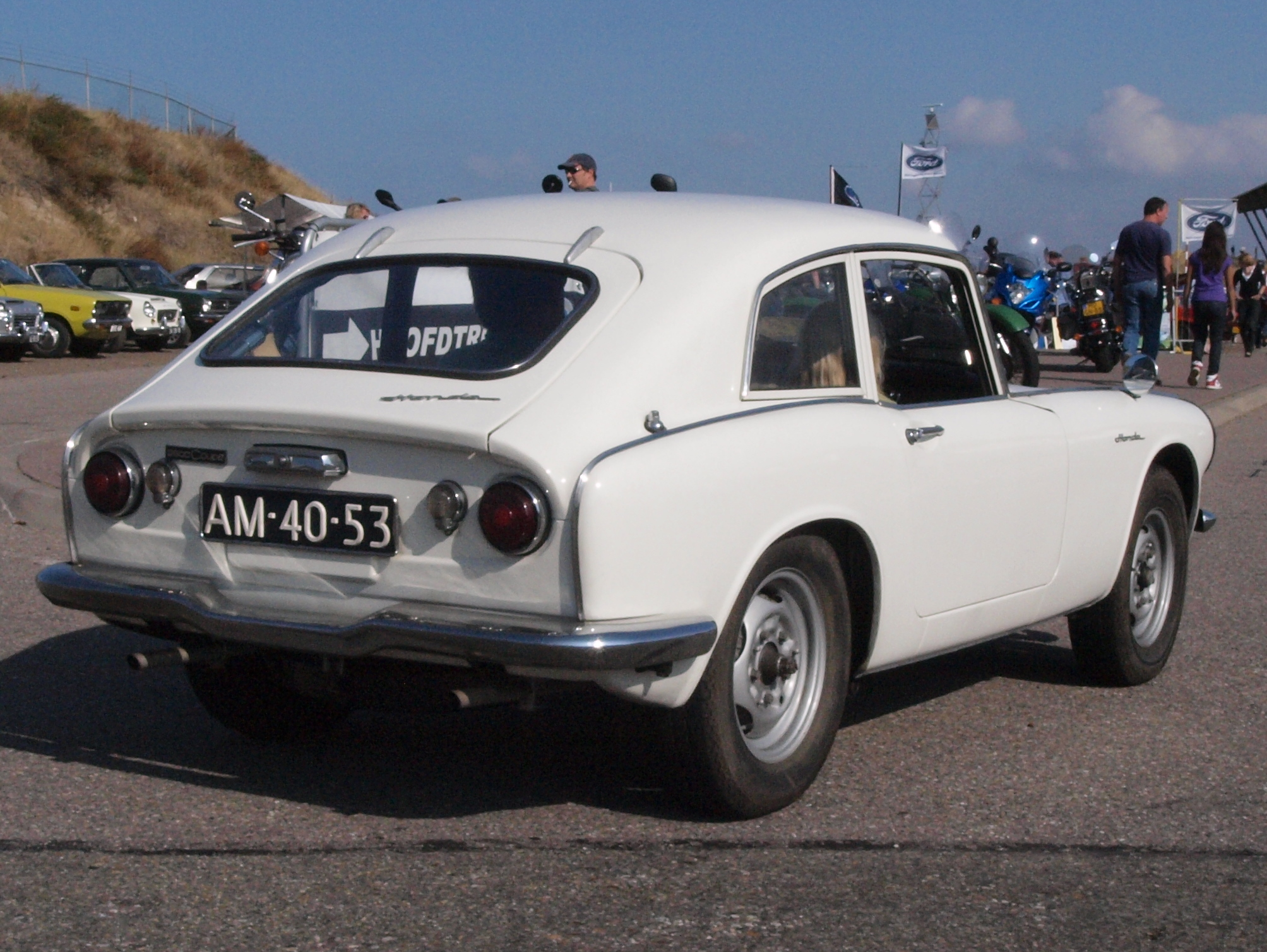
Honda SM600 fastback

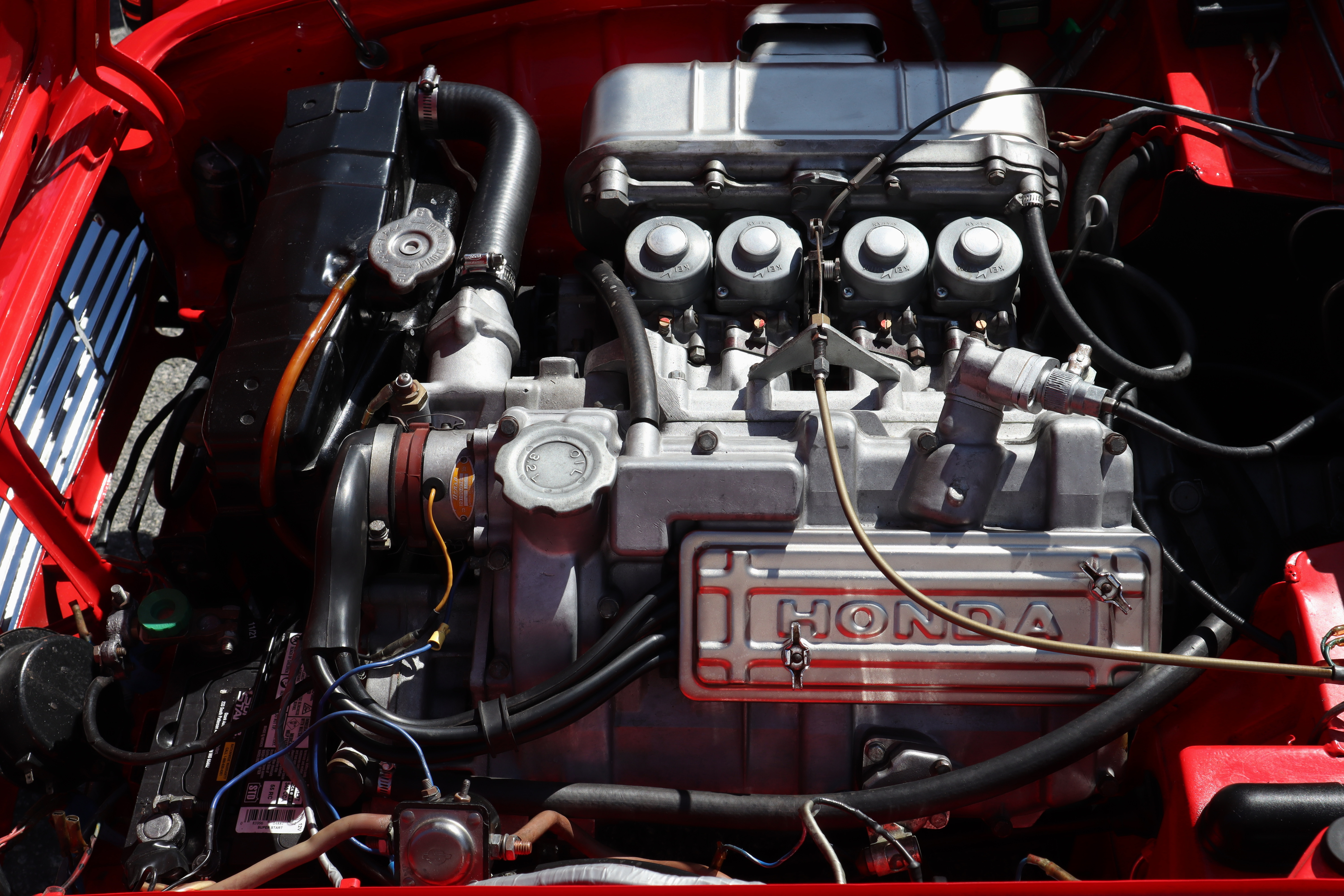
Honda S600 engine
