= Honda S500 =

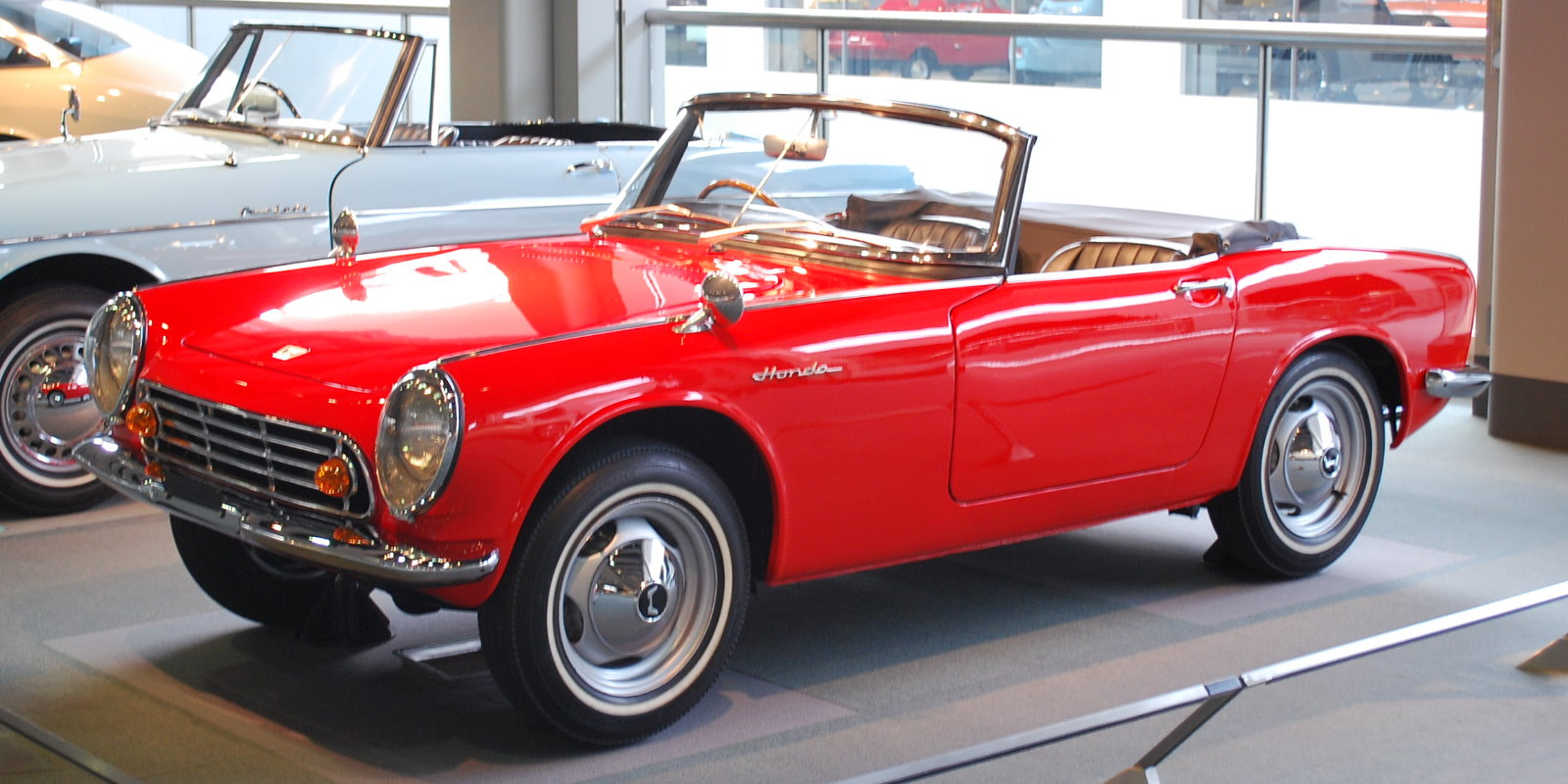

Overview
- Manufacturer: Honda
- Production: 1963–1964; 1,363 produced
- Assembly: Hamamatsu factory, Shizuoka Prefecture, Japan

Body and chassis
- Class: Sports car Kei car
- Body style: 2-door roadster
- Layout: Front-engine, rear-wheel-drive layout
- Related: Honda T500

Powertrain
- Engine: 531 cc DOHC I4
- Transmission: 4-speed manual

Dimensions
- Wheelbase: 2,000 mm (78.7 in)
- Length: 3,300 mm (129.9 in)
- Width: 1,430 mm (56.3 in)
- Height: 1,200 mm (47.2 in)

Chronology
- Successor: Honda S600

The Honda S500 was the second production car model manufactured by Honda (and its first passenger automobile), released in 1963, following the T360 truck into production by four months. It was a larger-displacement variant of the S360 roadster which, though developed for sale in 1962, was never produced.

== Design ==
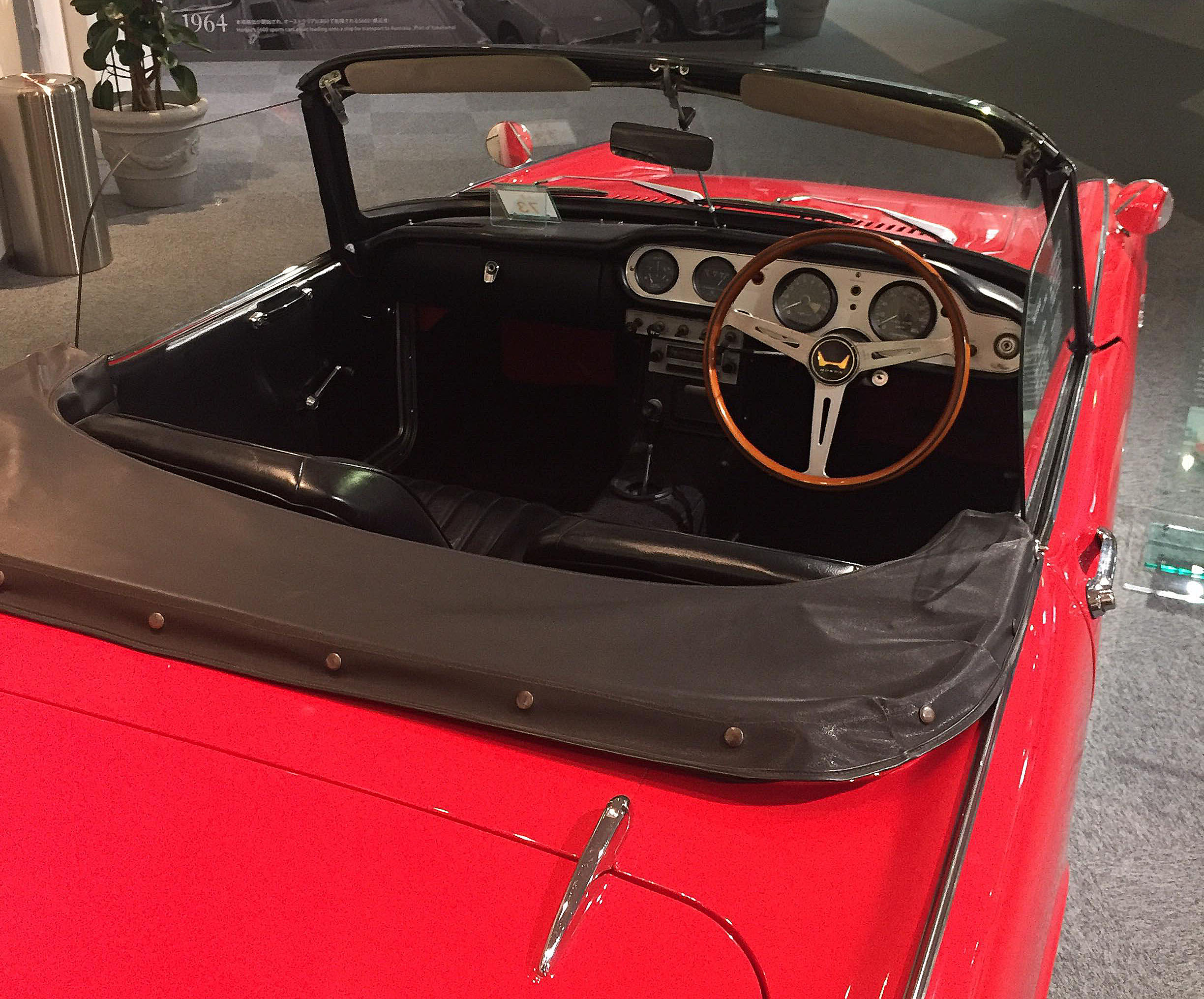
Honda S500 interior at the Honda Collection Hall in Motegi

Like the S360, the S500 used a high-tech engine developed from Honda's motorcycle expertise. It was a dual overhead cam straight-4 with four Keihin carburetors and a 9500 rpm redline. Originally intended to displace 492 cc, the production version was 531 cc and produced 44 hp (33 kW) at 8000 rpm. At the time of its introduction, its dimensions and engine displacement were larger than established kei car regulations.

The S500 used a four-speed manual transmission. A four-wheel independent suspension was also novel, with torsion bars at the front and chain-driven, coilover-sprung trailing arms at the rear.

The car was priced at $1,275 in 1963. An optional fiberglass hardtop was also available. 1,363 S500s were produced from October 1963 through September 1964.

The S500 saw competitors during its introduction, such as the Datsun Fairlady, the Toyota Sports 800, and the Daihatsu Compagno.

== Notes ==
- "Honda S500 1963 - 1964". ThisOldHonda.org. Archived from the original on October 31, 2004.
