= Honda EV-N concept =

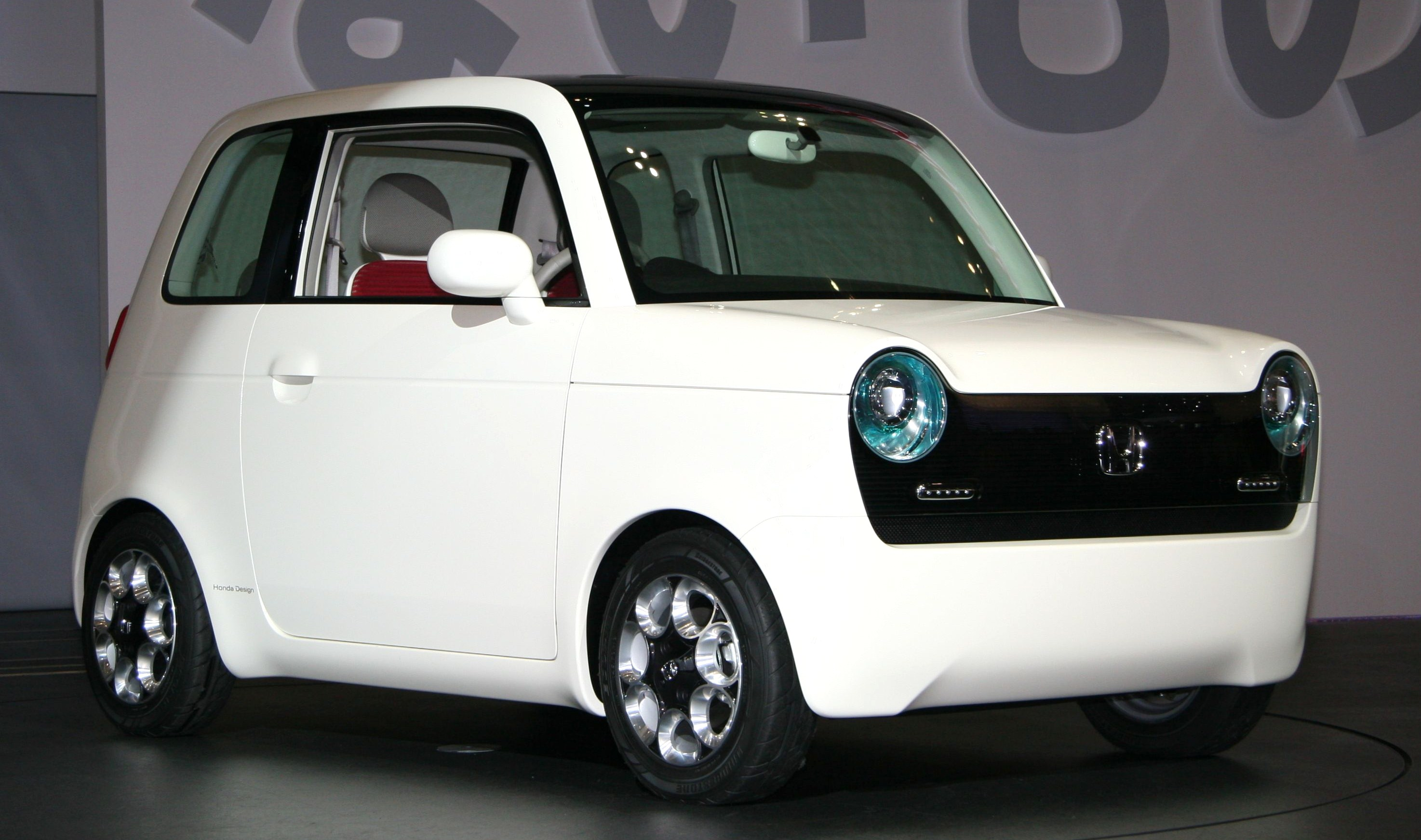

Overview
- Manufacturer: Honda
- Designer: Kanna Sumiyoshi (project & interior); Naoya Ishikura (exterior); Yuuki Nagasawa (interior); Sayuri Hanzawa (color & trim)

Body and chassis
- Class: Subcompact car (A)
- Body style: 3-door hatchback

Dimensions
- Wheelbase: 1,997 mm (79 in)
- Length: 2,860 mm (113 in)
- Width: 1,475 mm (58 in)
- Height: 1,515 mm (60 in)

The Honda EV-N concept vehicle was a concept electric car created by the automobile division of Honda, designed as an homage to the N360 kei car. The vehicle made its world premiere at the Tokyo Motor Show in October 2009, and had its European debut at Geneva the following March.

The styling of the EV-N concept would influence the later Honda N-One (2012) and Urban EV Concept (2017). The Urban EV concept also derived its styling from the first generation Civic hatchback and later reached production as the Honda e in 2019.

== Design ==
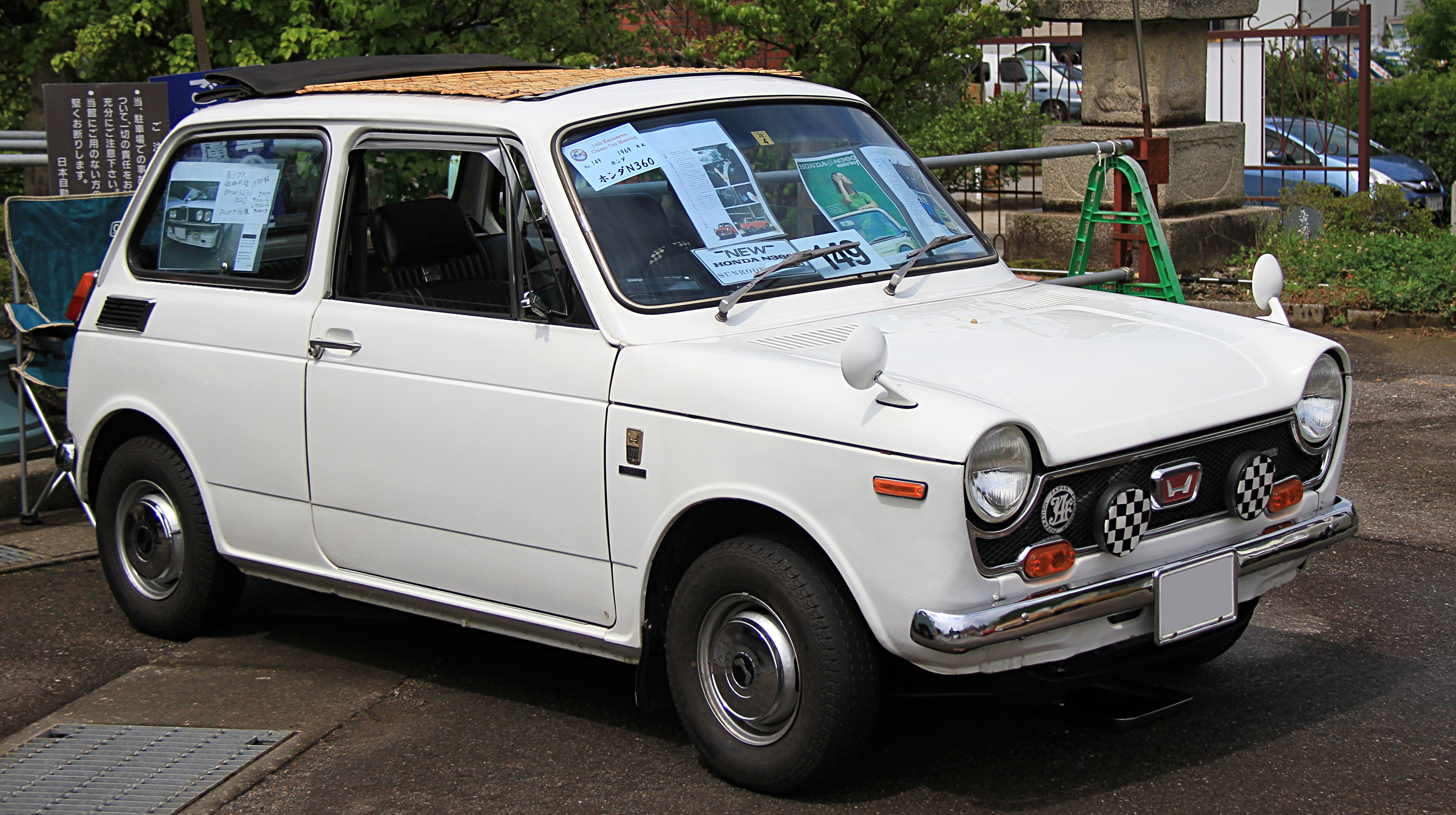
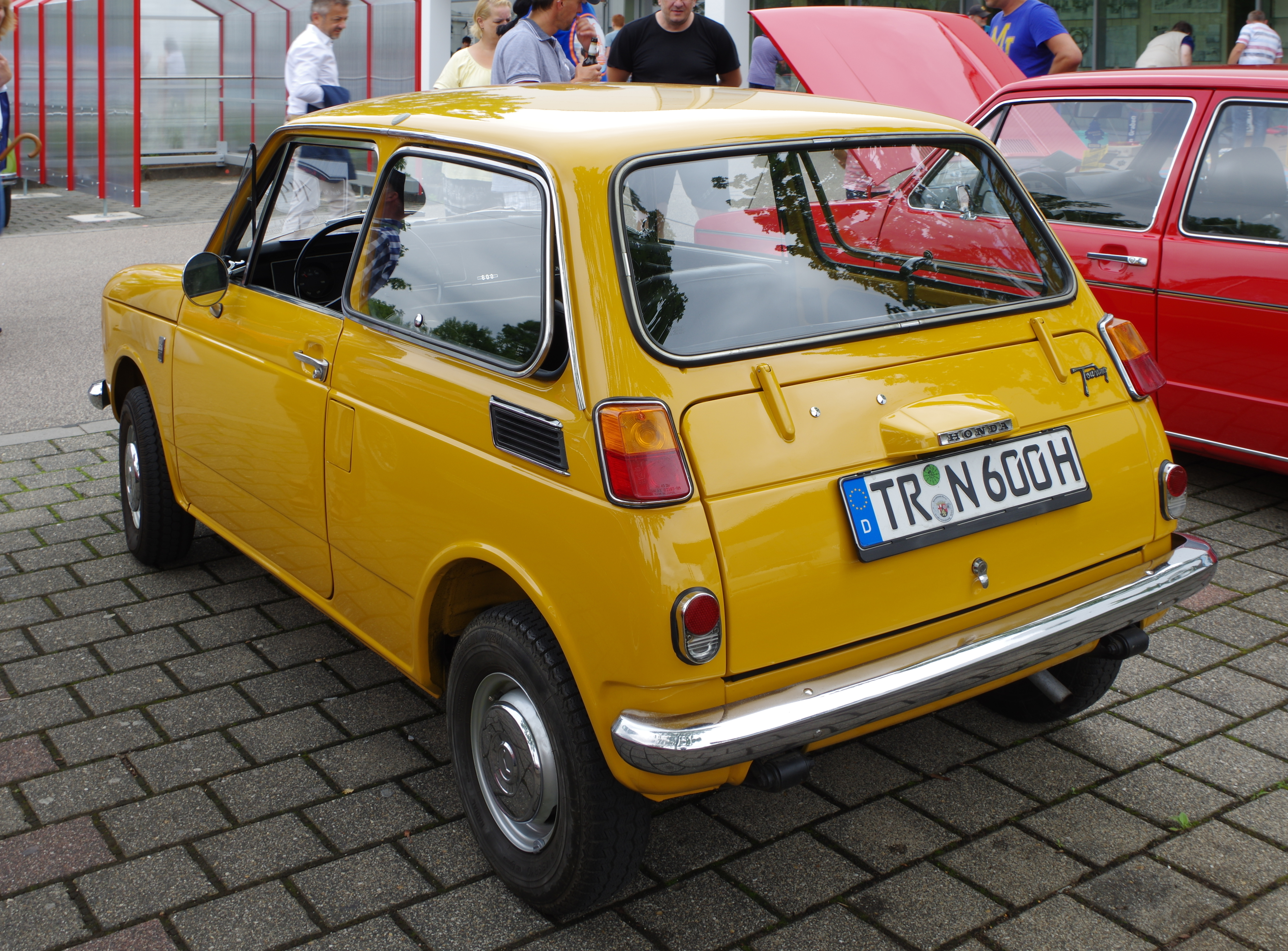
Honda N360/N600, front and rear

The concept was styled to deliberately evoke the N360, first sold in 1967. The EV-N project was led by Kanna Sumiyoshi, who also collaborated with Yuuki Nagasawa on the interior design, and Sayuri Hanzawa was responsible for color and trim. The exterior was designed by Naoya Ishikura.

The design embodied the Honda philosophy of "man maximum, machine minimum" to emphasize operating and space efficiency; the interior is sufficiently large to accommodate four adults. In addition, the exterior and interior styling were made as simple as possible to "reduce superfluous flesh"; Honda's head of design, Nobuki Ebisawa, believed that younger drivers would "see [the N360-like] style — as translated into the EV-N — as very new" and would appreciate the simple styling rather than the retro elements.

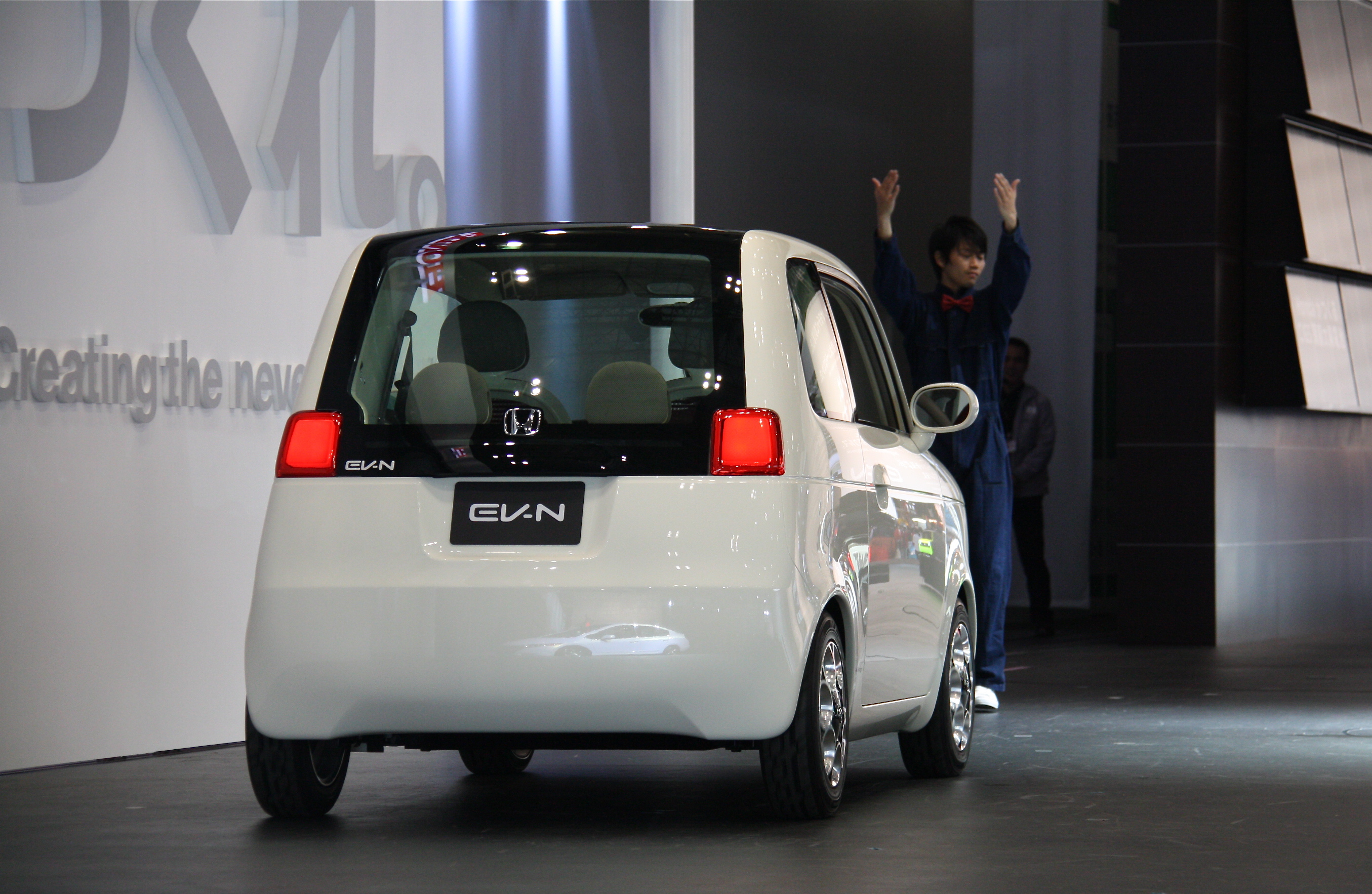
Rear of EV-N

Solar cells embedded in the roof panel allow recharging of the vehicle while it is parked. Interior seats use a frame to support stretched fabric panels, which can be swapped. The seat structure was chosen to reduce weight and increase passenger space. The space under the bonnet is used as the car's trunk, although the rear seats can also be folded down to accommodate cargo.

The car is equipped with the Honda LOOP vehicle-to-vehicle communication system. The driver may also communicate with the car via a handheld LOOP device, which includes a liquid-crystal display to provide basic information, such as how long the car has been parked and its state of charge; the front fascia of the EV-N lights up as the driver (with the LOOP) approaches or departs. One Honda U3-X personal mobility device is attached to the interior panel of the passenger-side door. The EV-N, U3-X, and other vehicles were shown at Tokyo as part of Honda's HELLO! (Honda ELectric mobility LOop) display.

Although Honda had declared the EV-N was a styling exercise only, Honda CEO Takanobu Ito was surprised by the strong interest in the car from foreign press. In 2010, the EV-N concept was shortlisted for the Brit Insurance Design Awards in the Transport category.

== Production ==
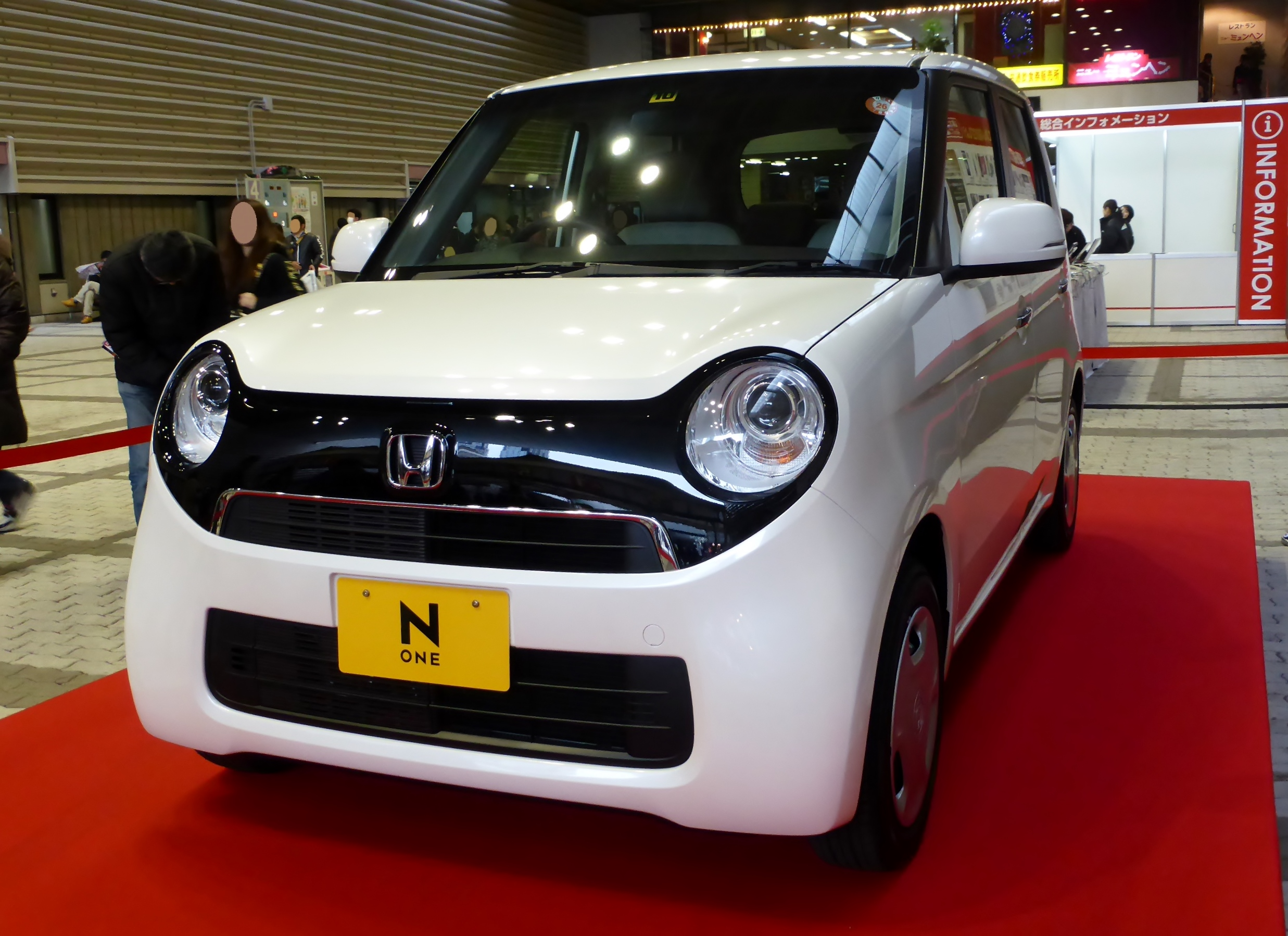
Honda N-One (2014)

The styling of the 5-door Honda N-One kei car, as an homage to the N360, is also inspired by the EV-N concept. The N-One was launched in fall 2012 with conventional (gasoline engine) power.

== See also ==
- Ford 021C, a similar high-style retro concept
