= NUR E 75 =

Pakistani electric city car

JaXari NUR-E 75

Overview
- Manufacturer: DICE Foundation
- Production: Late 2024 (to commence)

Body and chassis
- Class: City car
- Body style: 5-door hatchback

Powertrain
- Electric motor: 80 kW
- Power output: 108–156 hp (81–116 kW; 109–158 PS)
- Battery: 35 kWh Li-ion NED Energy; 54.0 kWh Li-ion
- Electric range: 210–403 km (130–250 mi)
- Plug-in charging: 2 hours (DC); 7-8 hours (220V AC)

Dimensions
- Wheelbase: 2,655 mm (104.5 in)
- Length: 4,385 mm (172.6 in)
- Width: 1,850 mm (72.8 in)
- Height: 1,650 mm (65.0 in)
- Curb weight: 1,765 kg (3,891 lb)

The JaXari NUR-E 75 is a locally-produced Pakistani electric city car, first unveiled at Karachi on 15 August 2022 for Pakistan's diamond jubilee. It is designed by the DICE (Distinguished Innovation, Collaboration & Entrepreneurship) Foundation, a Detroit-headquartered non-profit organization consisting of expatriate Pakistanis from worldwide locations such as the US and EU which provides engineering services to Pakistani organizations. The JaXari brand is named after 12th-century engineer and scientist Ismael al-Jazari.

== Overview ==
DICE Foundation chairman Dr. Khurshid Qureshi said that initial engineering for the project began in 2019, and the fully functional prototype presented in August 2022 is ready for testing and the regulatory approval process. Additionally, the project has plans to develop a small SUV and sedan in the future after the original hatchback model is put into production. At the vehicle's planned production start date in the fourth quarter of 2024, around 60% of the parts will be locally produced, which is expected to increase to 80% in the following years. Definite pricing details were not announced, but Qureshi said that the NUR-E should be priced well below contemporary vehicle options in the segment such as the Nissan Leaf and Honda e, which are priced at $35,000 and $40,000 USD, respectively; a company representative said the price should not be expected to fall below ₨2,000,000 (approx. $9,300 USD).

In May 2023, the DICE Foundation said that they had set up an R&D office in the Korangi Industrial Area in January of that year, with plans to setup a manufacturing facility in 2024 in time for production and deliveries to begin in early 2025.

=== Specifications ===
The car is a 5-seater hatchback. It is equipped with 16-inch wheels with R16 205/55 tires, and has a ground clearance of 190 mm (7.5 in) and a turning radius of 5.6 m (18.4 ft). The car has a peak power of 107 hp (80 kW; 108 PS) and 200 N⋅m (148 lb⋅ft) of torque and is powered by a battery capacity of 35 kWh, which allows for a range of 210 km (130 mi) without use of air conditioning and a top speed of 180 km/h (110 mph).
