= Honda Urban =

Honda Urban may refer to:

- Honda Urban SUV Concept, 2013 concept subcompact crossover SUV based on Honda Vezel
- Honda Urban EV Concept, a 2017 concept electric car
