= Honda e =

Battery electric hatchback produced by Honda (2020-2024)

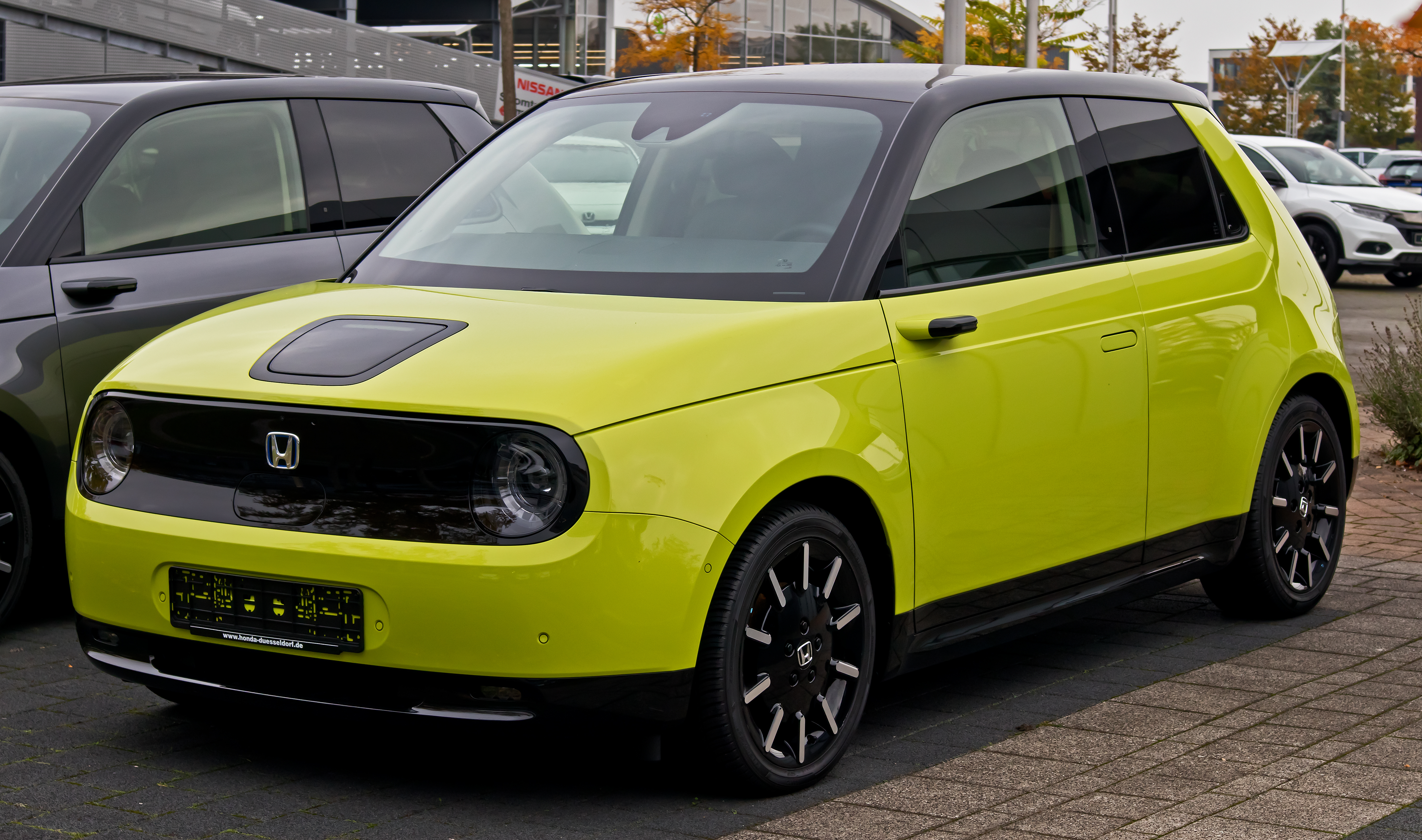
- Honda e Advance

Overview
- Manufacturer: Honda
- Model code: ZC7
- Production: October 2020 – January 2024
- Assembly: Japan: Yorii, Saitama (Saitama plant)
- Designer: Ken Sahara (exterior); Akinori Myoui (interior)

Body and chassis
- Class: Subcompact car/supermini (B)
- Body style: 5-door hatchback
- Layout: Rear-motor, rear-wheel-drive

Powertrain
- Electric motor: MCF5 permanent magnet brushless motor
- Power output: 100–113 kW (134–152 hp), 315 N⋅m (232 lb⋅ft)
- Transmission: 1-speed fixed gear
- Battery: 35.5 kWh lithium-ion
- Electric range: 220 km (137 mi)

Dimensions
- Wheelbase: 2,530 mm (99.6 in)
- Length: 3,894 mm (153.3 in)
- Width: 1,752 mm (69.0 in)
- Height: 1,503 mm (59.2 in)
- Curb weight: 1,513–1,543 kg (3,336–3,402 lb)

Chronology
- Predecessor: Honda EV Plus
- Successor: Honda Super-One / Super-N

The Honda e is a battery electric car that was manufactured by Japanese automaker Honda and sold in Japan from 2020 to 2024 and in Europe from 2020 to 2023. It is a supermini with a five-door hatchback design and a battery-electric powertrain that drives the rear wheels. The vehicle is styled with a retro look reminiscent of the first-generation Civic. It was previewed by the 2017 Urban EV Concept with the production version first shown publicly in 2019.

== History ==
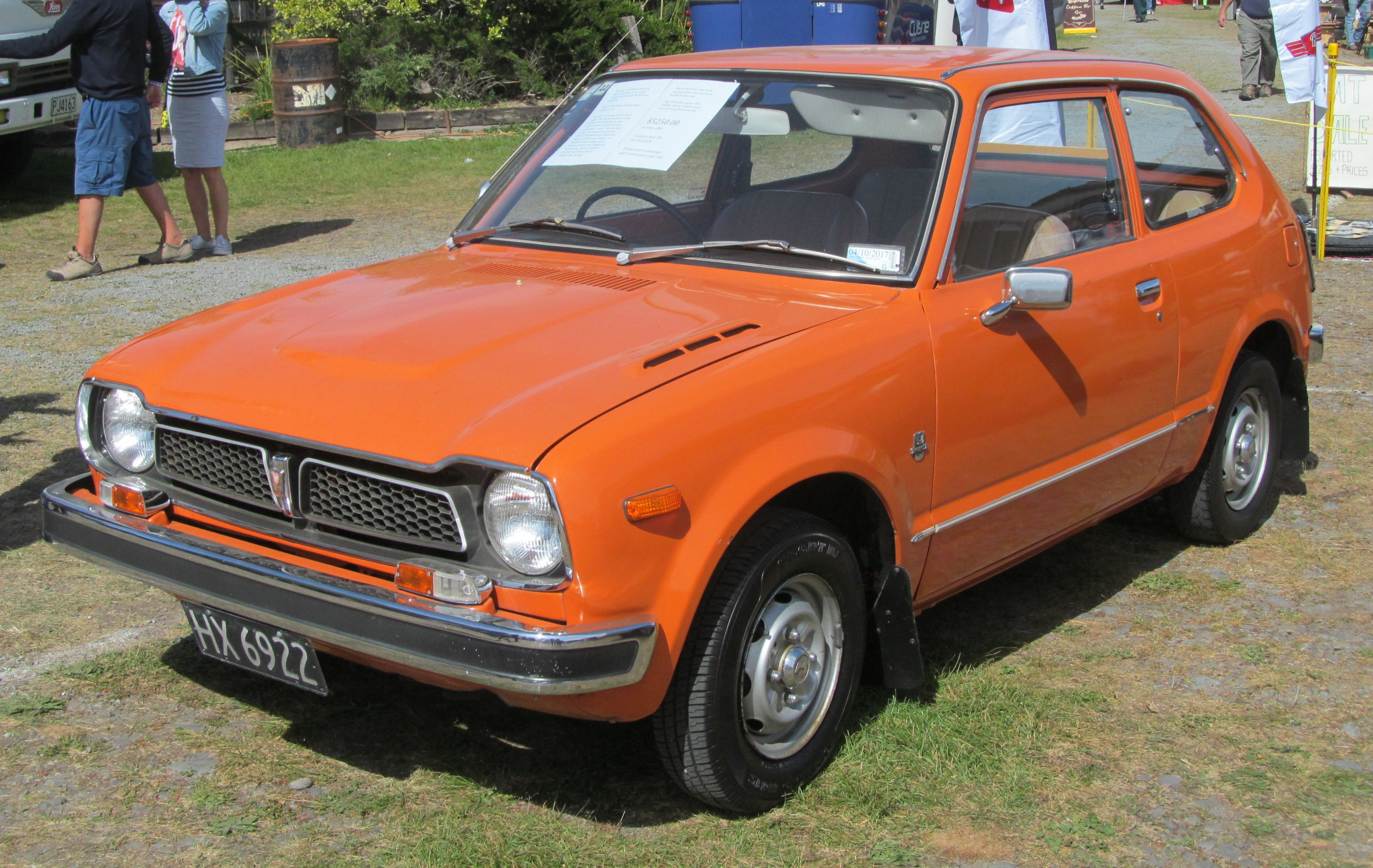
1976 first-generation Civic

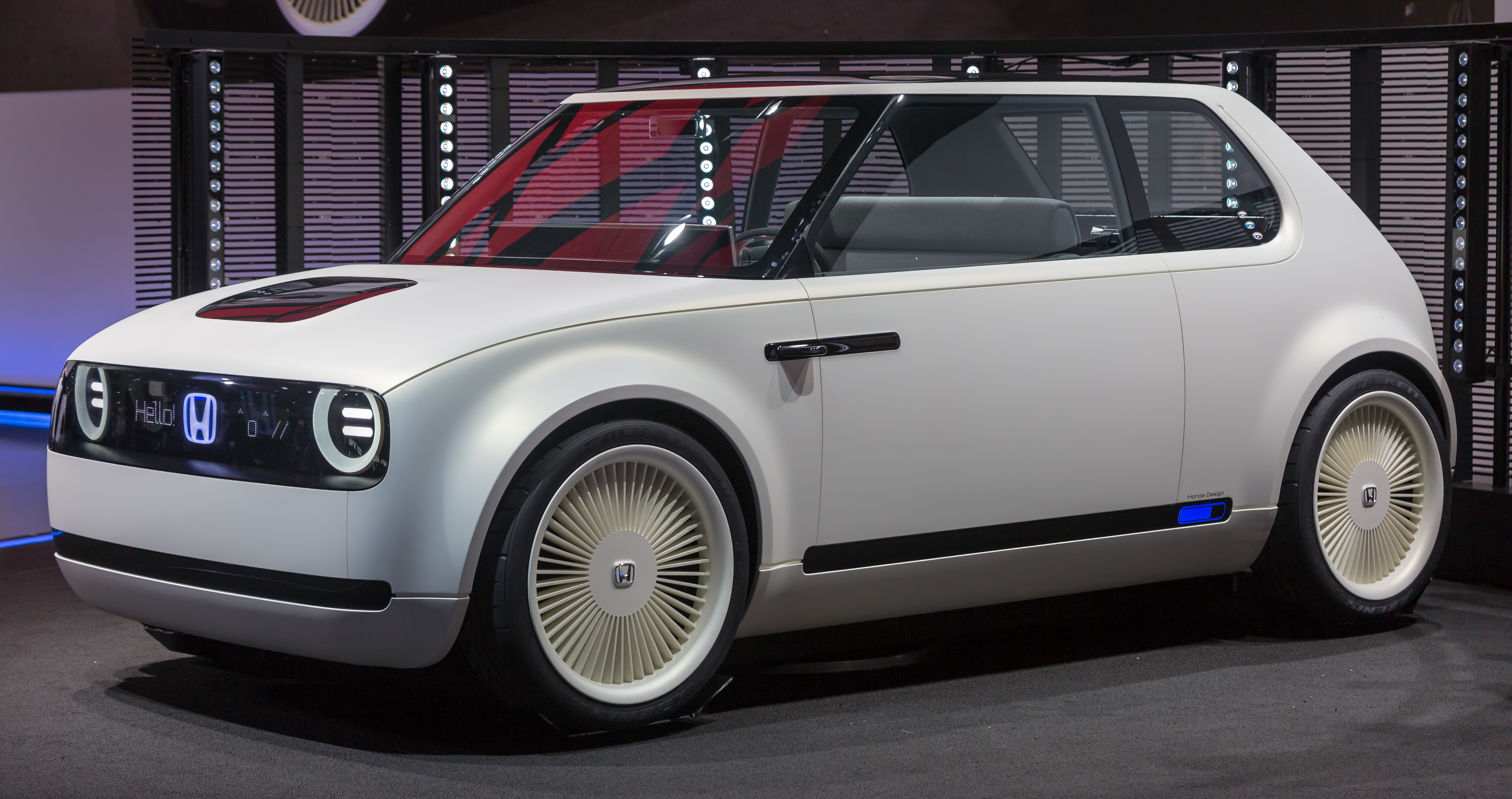

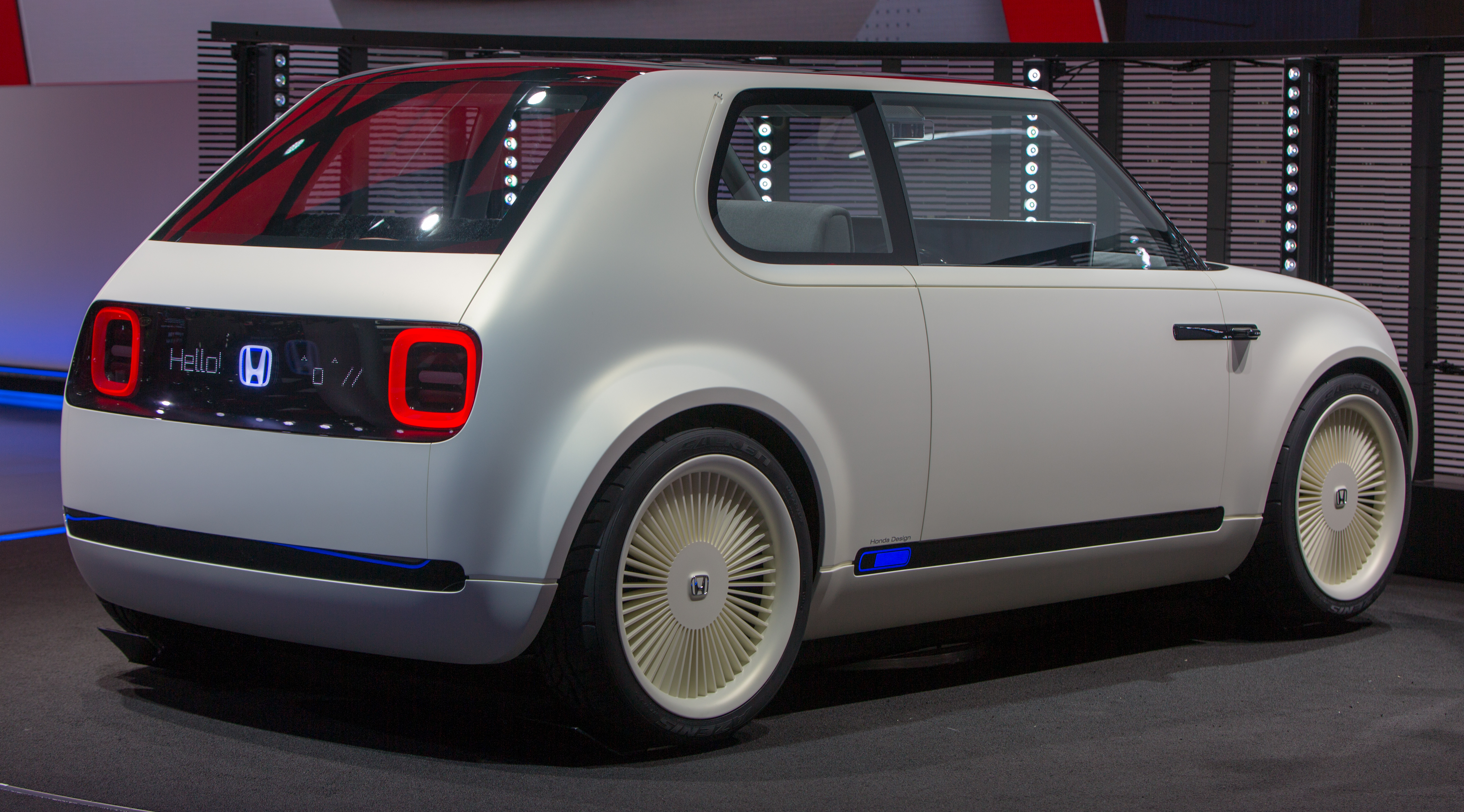
3-door 2017 Honda Urban EV Concept

The Urban EV Concept, first shown in 2017, was styled by Yuki Terai (exterior) and Fumihiro Yaguchi (interior) to evoke friendly and comforting feelings in prospective owners. Press coverage of the Urban EV Concept's styling called it "an adorable homage to some of Honda's first small cars, such as the diminutive Civic hatchbacks of the 1970s" and compared it to other urban cars originally introduced in the 1970s and early 1980s, including the Volkswagen Golf and Polo, Peugeot 205, Fiat 126 and 127, and the Honda's N600, pointing out similarities to the styling of the concept vehicle's predecessor, the EV-N concept.

The pre-production car (named the Honda e) had its world debut at the Geneva Motor Show in March 2019. Its styling is an evolution of the 2017 Urban EV Concept; Honda equipped the 2019 prototype with flush-mounted door handles and compact rear-view cameras on each side to simplify its profile and to improve aerodynamics. To facilitate charging from either side, the charging port is located in the middle of the car's bonnet (hood). The final production version of the e made its world debut at IAA 2019 in September 2019, held in Frankfurt, Germany. Unlike the layout of the Urban EV Concept, which was a three-door hatchback, the production version is available only as a five-door model. Its name was confirmed by Honda in May 2019.

On 10 September 2019, Honda announced prices would start at €29,470 for the base model with the 100 kW motor (including local government subsidy) in Germany and £26,160 with a subsidy in the UK. The more powerful "Advance" grade would start at €32,470 in Germany and £28,660 in the UK with the uprated 113 kW motor. Deliveries began in summer 2020. Honda's stated their goal was to solely offer electrified powertrains in all mainstream European models by 2022.

=== Discontinuation ===
In late 2023, Honda announced production of the e would cease in January 2024, with no plans for a second generation model. This was due to slow sales of the e, with approximately 12,500 units being sold globally in a period of 3 years.

Despite its compact size being suitable for certain markets such as Europe, the car was not on par with customers' expectations, with a base starting price of €39,900 ($44,100), limited electric range on WLTP, and impractical interior ergonomics. Rivals in its class offered a better package at a more affordable price, contributing to the e's lack of success.

Honda stated their first BEV had brought “many new customers to the brand” in the European region, and continued to strengthen their electrification plans in Europe with the recently introduced Honda e:Ny1 model.

== Design ==
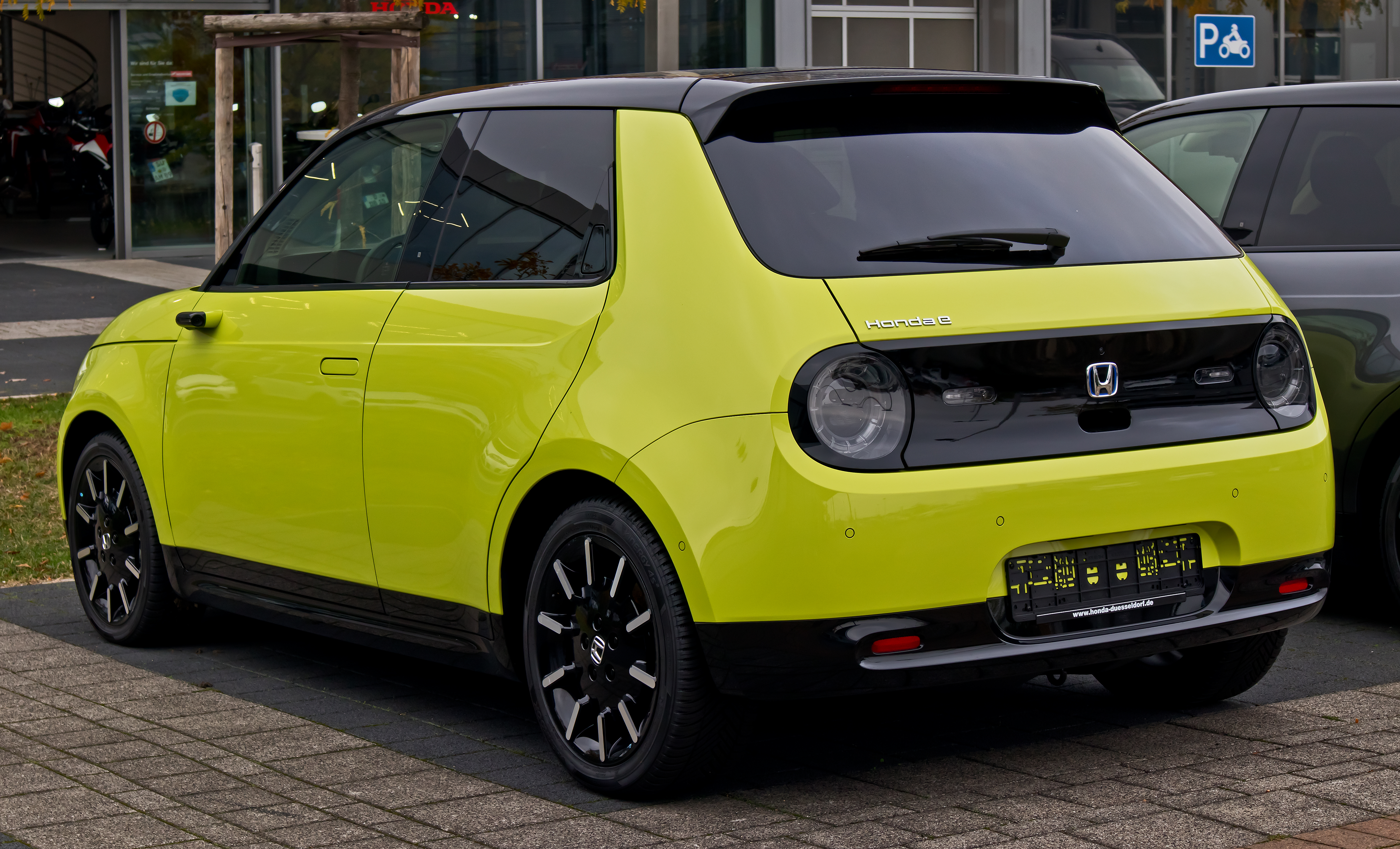
Rear

The e project was led by Kohei Hitomi; the exterior styling team was led by Ken Sahara and the interior styling team was led by Akinori Myoui.

According to Hitomi, the e faced significant resistance from within the company; other executives, concerned about the vehicle's range, argued that a larger battery was needed, but the project team insisted on using a smaller battery to complement the vehicle's small size and urban use. The positive feedback from the Urban EV Concept led to the approval of the production car.

=== Chassis ===
The e uses a dedicated rear-motor, rear-wheel-drive electric vehicle platform, to facilitate agility and compact proportions for the urban market. The water-cooled battery pack is carried within the wheelbase of the car, below the floor to provide a 50/50 weight distribution and a low centre of gravity. Driving the rear wheels eliminates torque steer. Agility is aided by torque vectoring. The rear-drive also enables the front wheels to have a greater steering articulation, resulting in a turning radius (at wheel centre) of approximately 4.3 metres (14 ft), or 4.6 metres (15 ft) at the body, i.e. a turning circle of 9.2 metres (30 ft), 1.6 metres (5 ft 3 in) wider than the 7.6 metres (25 ft) turning radius of the famous London black cabs. The platform features MacPherson strut independent suspension for each wheel.

=== Powertrain ===
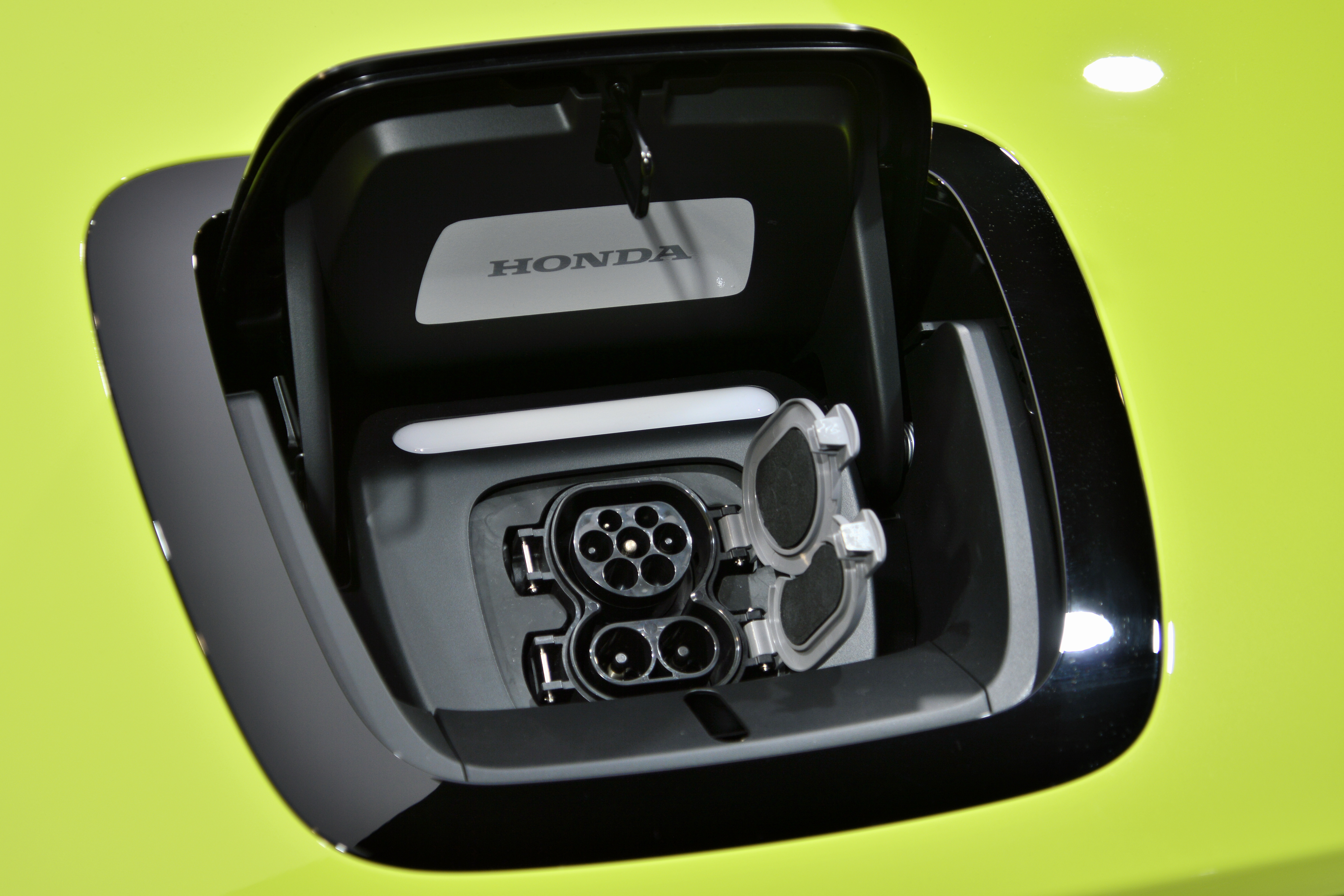
CCS Combo 2 connector charging port

The e features an electric motor at the rear, offering a power output of either 100 or 113 kW (134 or 152 hp); both variants offer 315 N⋅m (232 lb⋅ft) of torque. According to Honda testing, the car can accelerate from 0 to 100 km/h (0 to 62 mph) in 8.3 seconds. The e offers a 'Sport Mode' to sharpen acceleration response and can be driven in 'Single Pedal Control' mode, where releasing the accelerator will engage the regenerative braking system, slowing the car without using a separate brake pedal. Rumours of a potential higher-performance variant were quashed at the car's debut in Frankfurt.

A 35.5 kWh lithium-ion battery pack was claimed to offer a range of around 220 km (140 mi) as per Honda internal data. The e is equipped with a CCS Combo 2 connector, enabling both AC charging and DC fast charging. With DC fast charging, the car can be charged to 80% capacity in 30 minutes. Honda also announced the pending availability of its Power Charger, allowing a charging power of up to 7.4 kW (single-phase). Three-phase charging (22 kW) was not available. With a 7.4 kW charger, the vehicle would charge to 100% capacity in approximately 4 hours.

=== Features ===
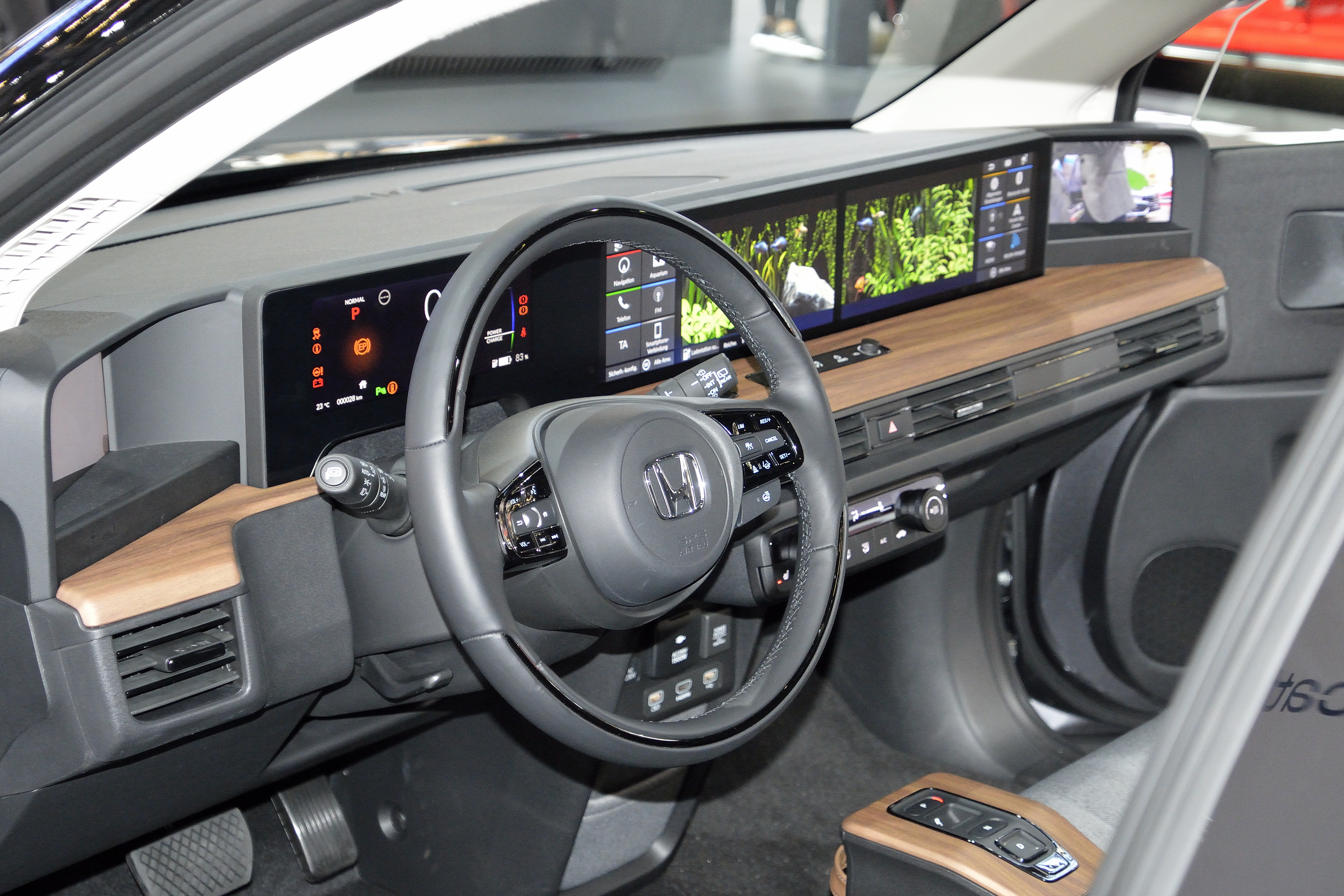
Instrument panel

The instrument panel, which extends the full width of the interior, consists of five screens, including one dedicated 220 mm (8.8 in) instrument display in front of the driver and two large 310 mm (12.3 in) infotainment touchscreen displays flanked by two smaller 150 mm (6 in) displays for what Honda calls its Side Camera Mirror System. The dual infotainment displays can independently run separate applications and are swappable; they support both Android Auto and Apple CarPlay. The car is equipped with the Honda Personal Assistant, which uses machine learning to train its voice recognition; voice commands to the car are prefixed with "OK Honda".

== Safety ==
=== Euro NCAP ===
Euro NCAP test results Honda e (RHD) (2020)
Test	Points	%
Overall:	4 /5 stars	
Adult occupant:	28.7	76%
Child occupant:	40.6	82%
Pedestrian:	33.9	62%
Safety assist:	10.4	65%

== Reception ==
Reception, in general, was positive due to the retro styling and mix of design and functionality. However, it was criticized for its limited range and high price.

Starting on 20 May 2019, customers in the UK and selected European markets (Germany, France and Norway) could place an order with an £800 (or equivalent) refundable deposit and Honda received over 25,000 expressions of interest across Europe, of which 6,500 came from the UK. By September, Honda had received 40,000 expressions of interest.

Reviewing the e Prototype for Car, Jake Groves wrote that it demonstrated "how electric cars should drive" with a caveat that the test drive took place on a test track in Germany. The "low-ish available range and expected-to-be-lofty price tag" were expected to put the car at a disadvantage compared to entry-level EV rivals such as the Tesla Model 3, Nissan Leaf, Hyundai Kona Electric, and Kia e-Niro. James Attwood, reviewing for Autocar, wrote the e Prototype has "nimble handling that fits its credentials as a versatile urban runaround — while offering the sort of fun driving response that should keep anyone already won over by the car's style happy."

=== Awards ===
The Honda e won "Red Dot: Best of the Best 2020" in the automobile category. It was named the overall "German Car of the Year" for 2021, becoming the first Japanese car to win the award. At the 2021 World Car Awards, it won the "World Urban Car of the Year" award.

== Sales ==
Honda expected to sell around 1,000 units annually in the Japanese market, and around 10,000 units annually in the European market. The car was not sold in the US market.

Year	Europe	Japan
2020	4,028	427
2021	3,752	721
2022	2,110	371

== See also ==
- Honda Clarity, Honda's electric and fuel cell vehicle family in North America and Japan.
- Honda EV Plus, Honda's late 1990s subcompact EV
- Honda E:Ny1, the battery electric model of Honda HR-V
