= Honda N360 =

City economy car produced by Honda (1967–1972)

Honda N360/N600
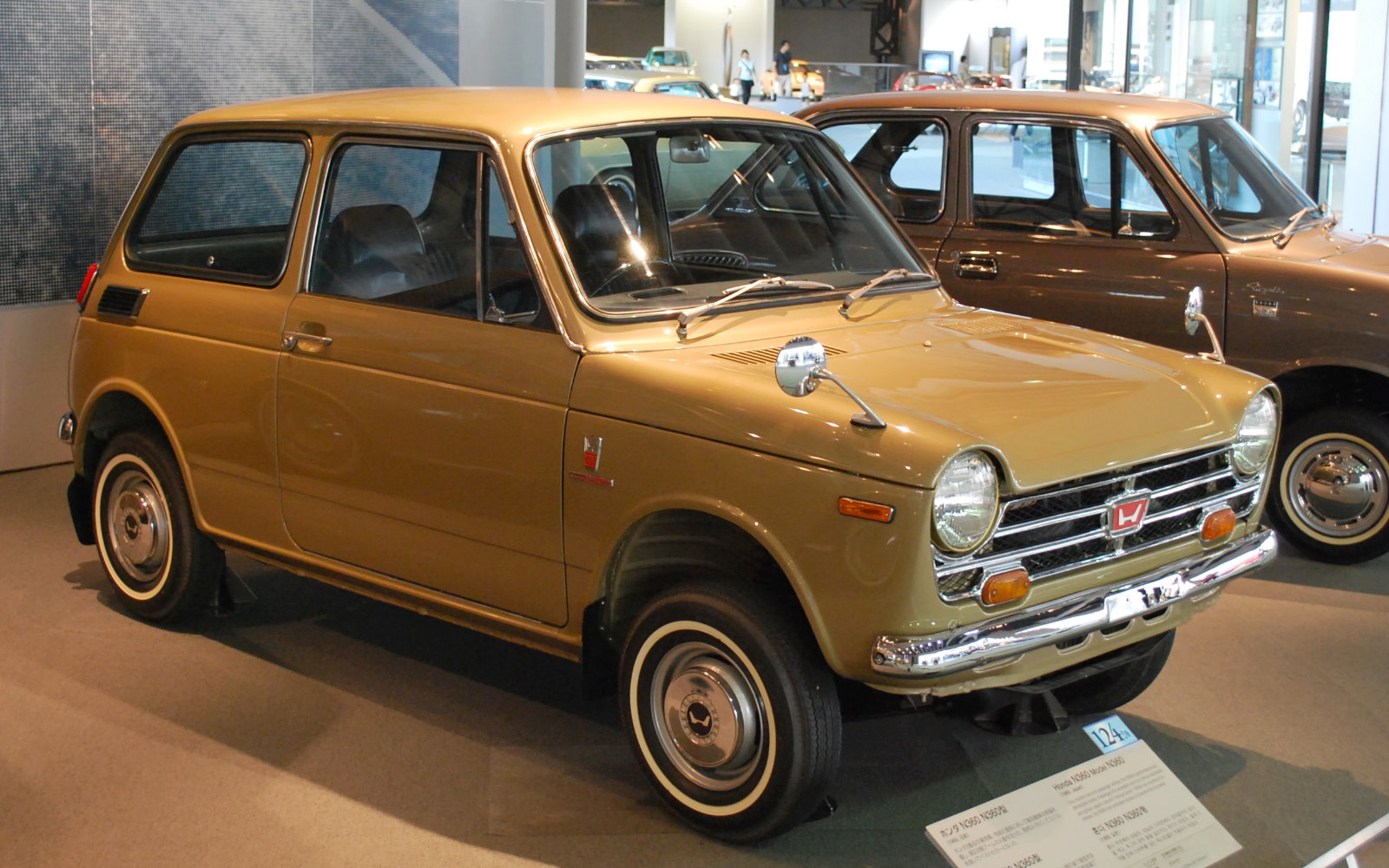
- 1969 Honda N360 sedan

Overview
- Manufacturer: Honda
- Also called: Honda LN360; Honda NIII360; Honda N400; Honda LN400; Honda N600 Fu Gui (ROC); Honda Scamp
- Production: 1967–1972
- Assembly: Suzuka Plant, Suzuka, Mie, Japan; Johor Bahru, Malaysia (Capital Motor); Taipei, Taiwan (Sanyang)

Body and chassis
- Class: Kei car/city car
- Body style: 2-door sedan; 3-door wagon ("Van")
- Layout: FF layout
- Related: Honda Life; Honda TN360; Honda Vamos; Honda Z360/Z600

Powertrain
- Engine: 354 cc N360E air-cooled I2; 402 cc N400E air-cooled I2; 598 cc N600E air-cooled I2
- Transmission: Four-speed manual constant mesh, dog-clutch engagement three-speed automatic

Dimensions
- Wheelbase: 2,000 mm (78.7 in)
- Length: 2,995 mm (117.9 in)
- Width: 1,295 mm (51 in)
- Height: 1,346 mm (53 in)
- Kerb weight: 508 kg (1,119 lb)

Chronology
- Successor: Honda Life (N360); Honda Civic (N600)

The Honda N360 is a small car manufactured and marketed by Honda from March 1967 to 1972. Built as both a two-door sedan and three-door wagon, the N360 has a front-engine, front-wheel-drive layout and seats four passengers. It became the best-selling kei passenger car in Japan just two months after its release.

After a January 1970 facelift, the N360 became the NIII 360 and continued in production until June 1972. A larger-engined variant, the N600, was marketed through 1973. All models used a straight forward two-box design that complied with kei car dimensional regulations — though vehicles with the 401 cc and 598 cc engines exceeded the kei engine displacement limits and were largely intended for markets outside Japan.

The simple N360 name, along with its variants, used the "N" prefix, which stood for norimono and translated from Japanese to English as vehicle (or car) — distinguishing the cars from the company's motorcycle offerings.

In 2012, Honda introduced the Honda N-One, an homage inspired by the 1967–1973 N sedans and continuing the name.

== Design ==
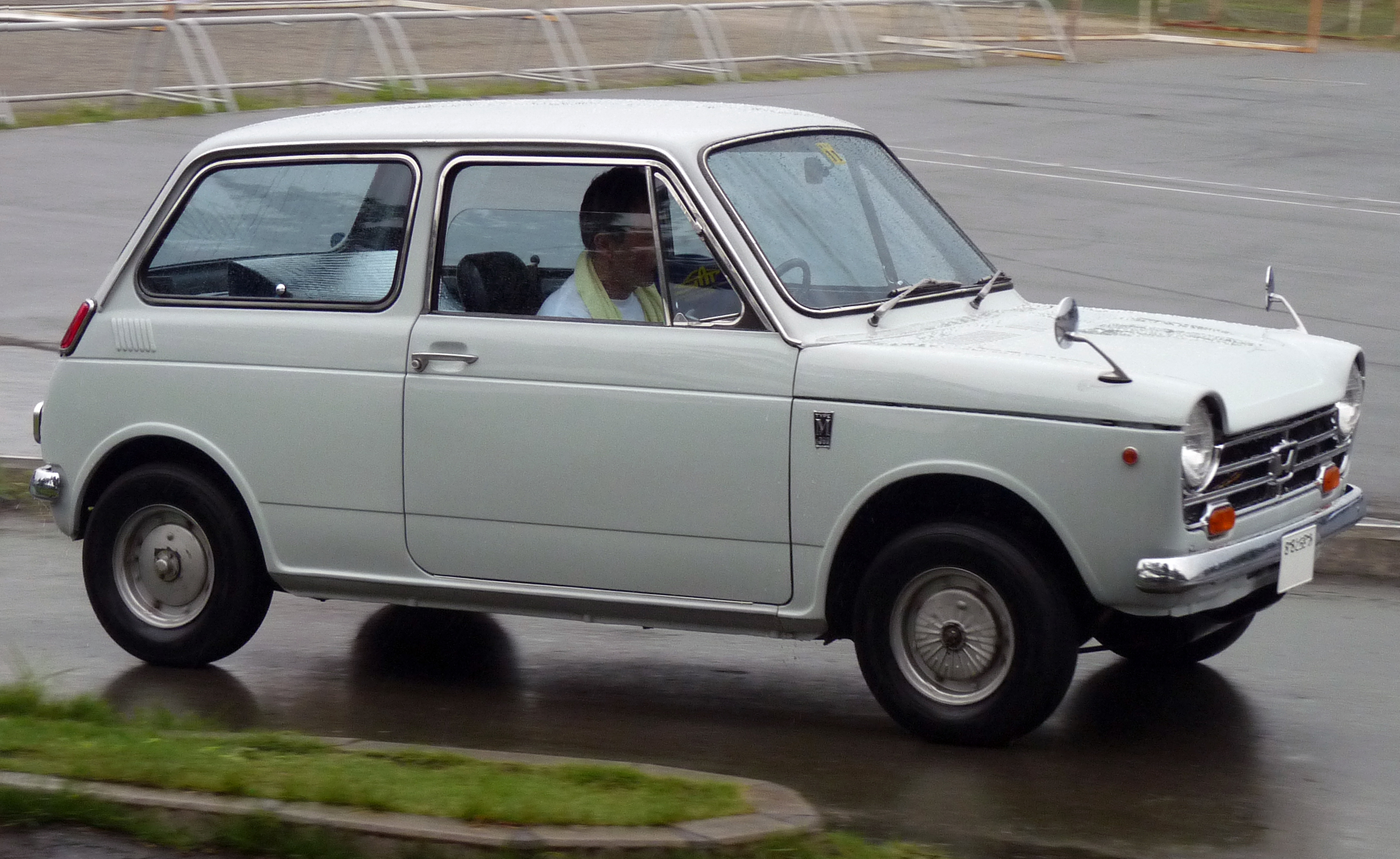
1967-1968 Honda N360 Type M

The N360 was an all new, clean-sheet product, and did not share its chassis with the Honda Sports roadster, or the Honda L700 commercial platform. The N360 was a new market segment for Honda, with the aim to provide an affordable, reliable, and easy-to-maintain vehicle that had broad market appeal to private car ownership. The roadsters and trucks built up to then had a more specific, targeted appeal. The spacious and comparably powerful N360 became an instant success in Japan, dethroning the perennial Subaru 360 as the best selling passenger car.

The N360 featured front-wheel drive and an air-cooled, four-stroke, 354 cc, 31 PS (23 kW; 31 hp) two-cylinder engine. While ultimately derived from Honda's motorcycle engines, the N360E engine has a 360-degree crankshaft angle ("parallel twin") unlike the 180-degree "vertical twin" setup typically used on Honda's two-cylinder motorcycle engines. This same engine was used in the Honda Vamos, where it was coupled with a beam axle/leaf spring rear suspension.

The engine's technological specifications reflected engineering efforts resulting from the development of the larger Honda 1300, which used an air-cooled 1.3-litre engine. One of the primary differences between the N360 and the Honda Life that followed was the N360/600 had an air-cooled engine, and the Life had a water-cooled engine. The water-cooled engine was better able to comply with newly enacted emission standards in Japan, and reflected an industry wide move away from air-cooled as well as two-stroke engines. As does the original Mini, but unlike the succeeding Life, the N360/600 had its gearbox mounted in the sump rather than bolted on as a separate unit. The N360E engine was unusual in several ways: its two cylinders sat rather far apart, with the cam chain running between them. Unlike most air-cooled automobile engine, it does not use an oil cooler. The two pistons travel together, eliminating the need for a distributor but making for additional vibrations. It uses either a single or double constant velocity (CV) carburetor of comparatively large bore; this design helps it run smoothly at low engine speeds in spite of the parallel twin engine layout.

An upgraded 36 PS (26 kW) engine was added in October 1968 for the N360 TS, which was sold as the N360 Touring following a minor update in January 1969. The updated version is referred to as the NII. A 401.54 cc engine was used in the similar N400, a model sold in certain export markets beginning in late summer 1968. This occupied the narrow slot between the 360 and the 600; in most markets where it was available it was only sold as the N400 L with better equipment. The Hondamatic-equipped N360AT which appeared in August 1968 was the first kei car equipped with an automatic transmission.

=== Bodystyles ===
Honda marketed the N360 as a two-door sedan, with a three-door wagon (considered a commercial vehicle in Japan, and therefore called a "Light van") called the LN360 arriving in June of the first year. It has a horizontally divided rear gate and boxier rear bodywork for maximum load capacity. The LN360 had the same 31 PS engine as the sedan, and a top speed of 105 km/h (65 mph). After a January 1970 facelift it became the LNIII 360, with a new non-reflective dash, bigger turn signals, and the same new front end as the sedan. The LNIII 360 was built until late 1971, when the Life Van took over.

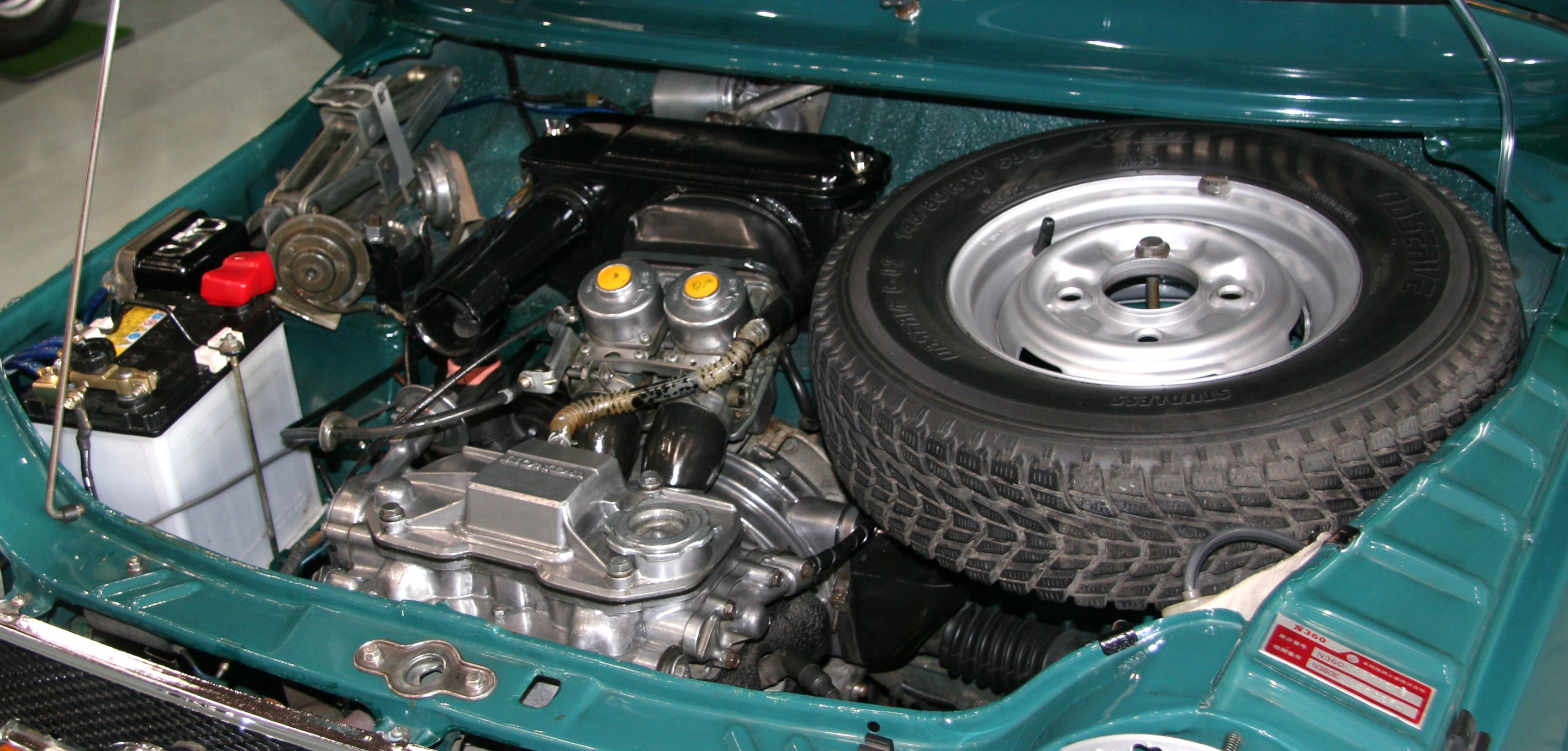
1969 Honda N360 air-cooled engine

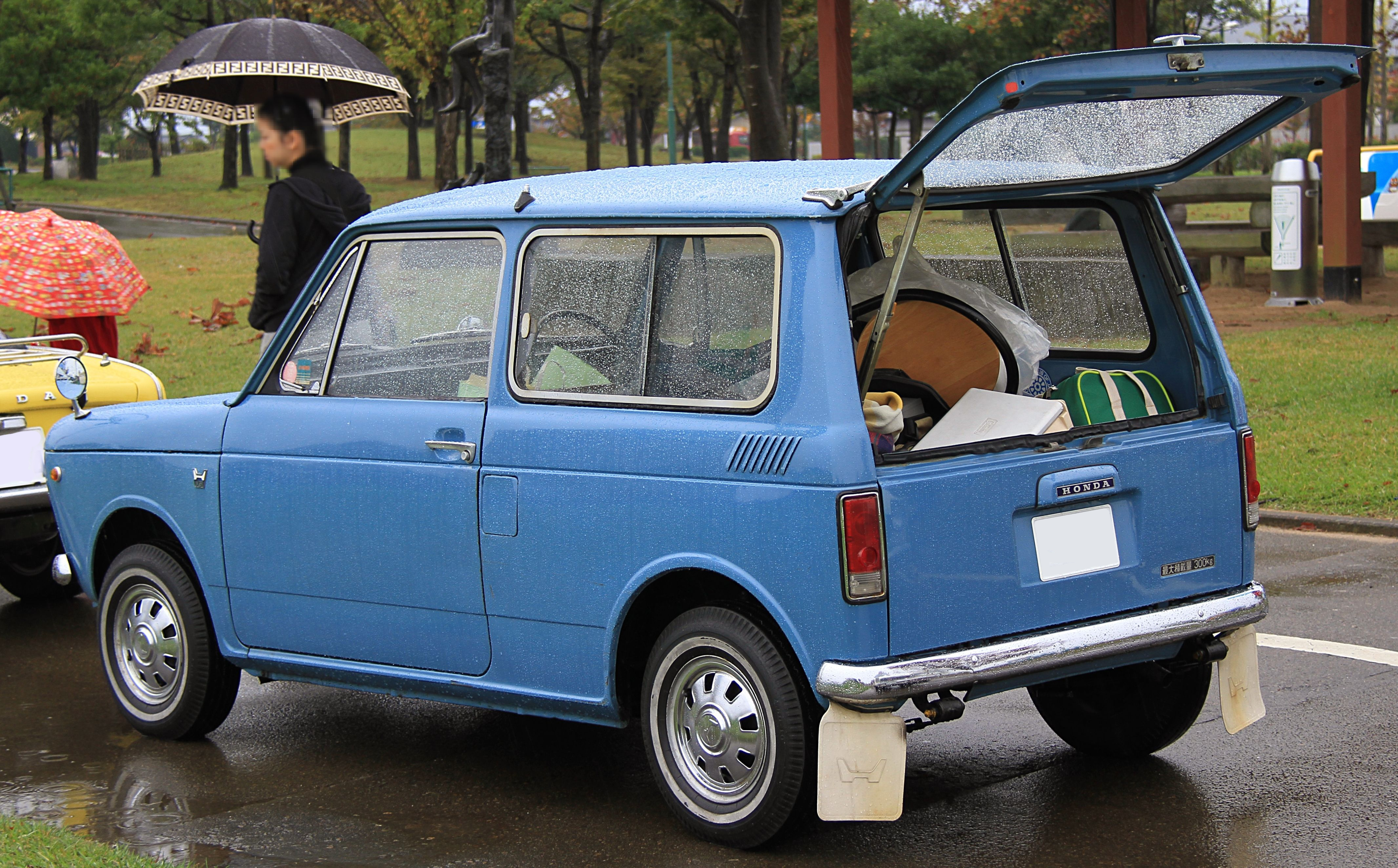
1967 Honda LN360 Van, rear view showing split door

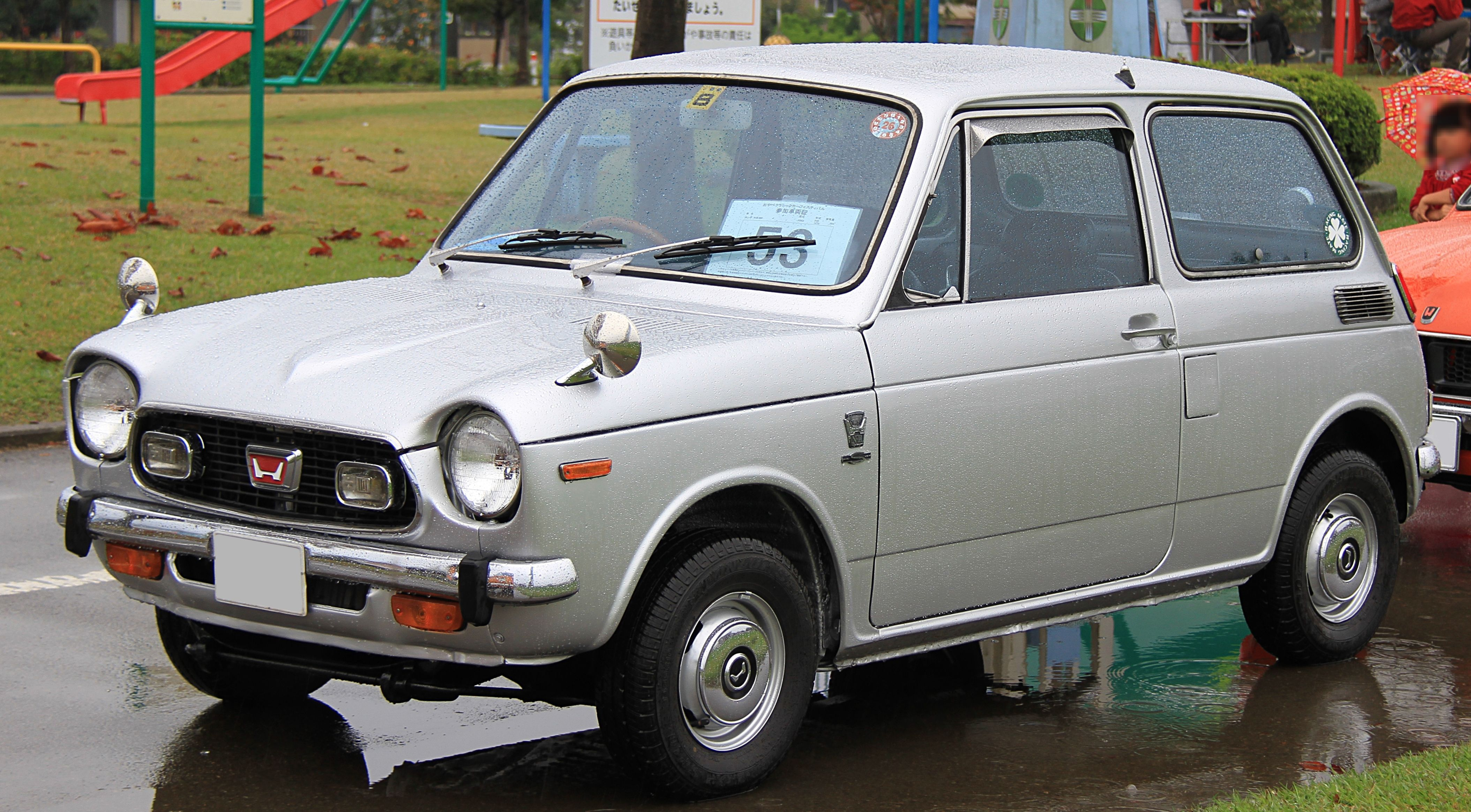
1970 Honda NIII 360

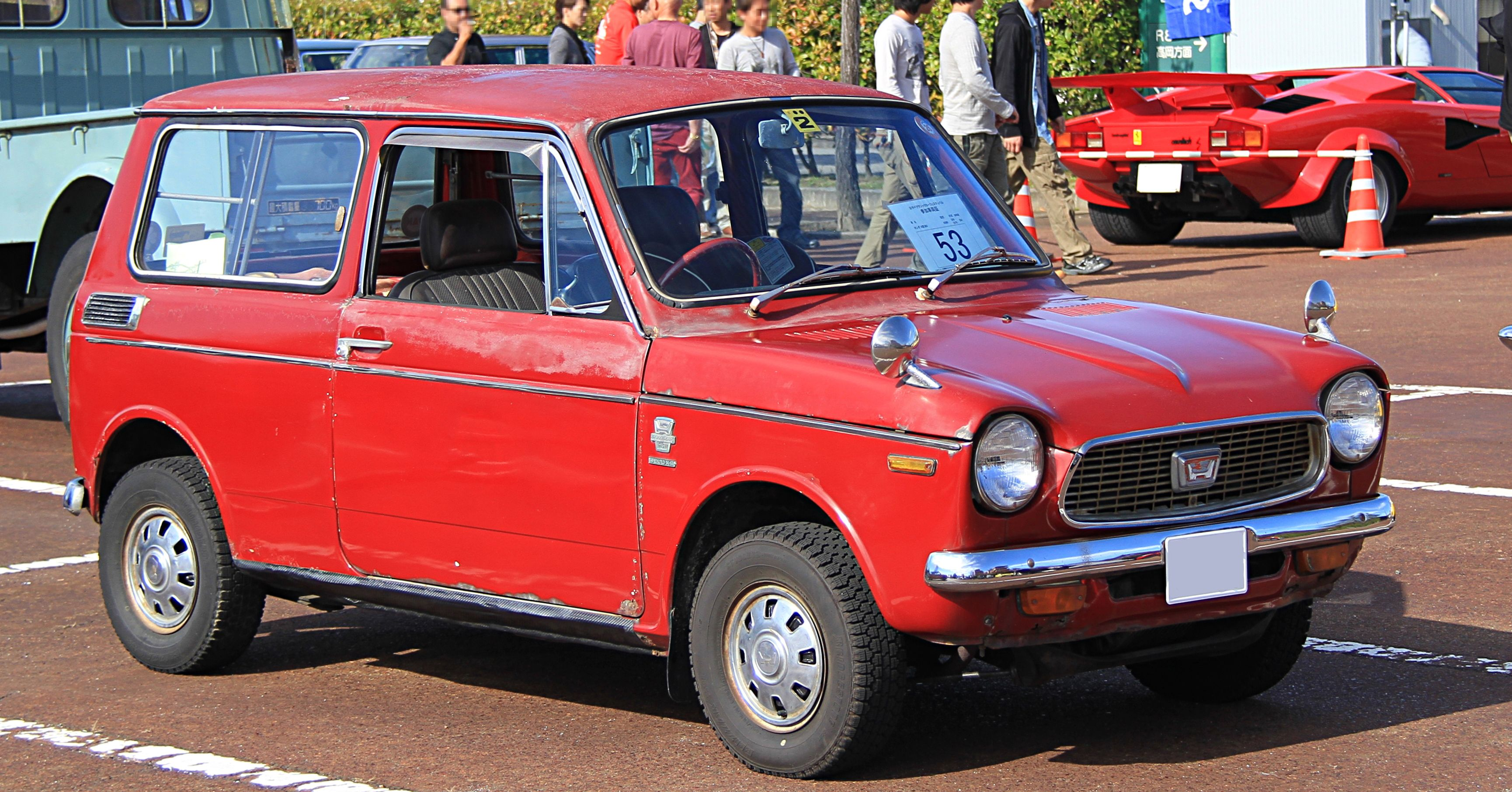
Honda LNIII 360 Van, facelift model (1970–1971)

== N600 ==
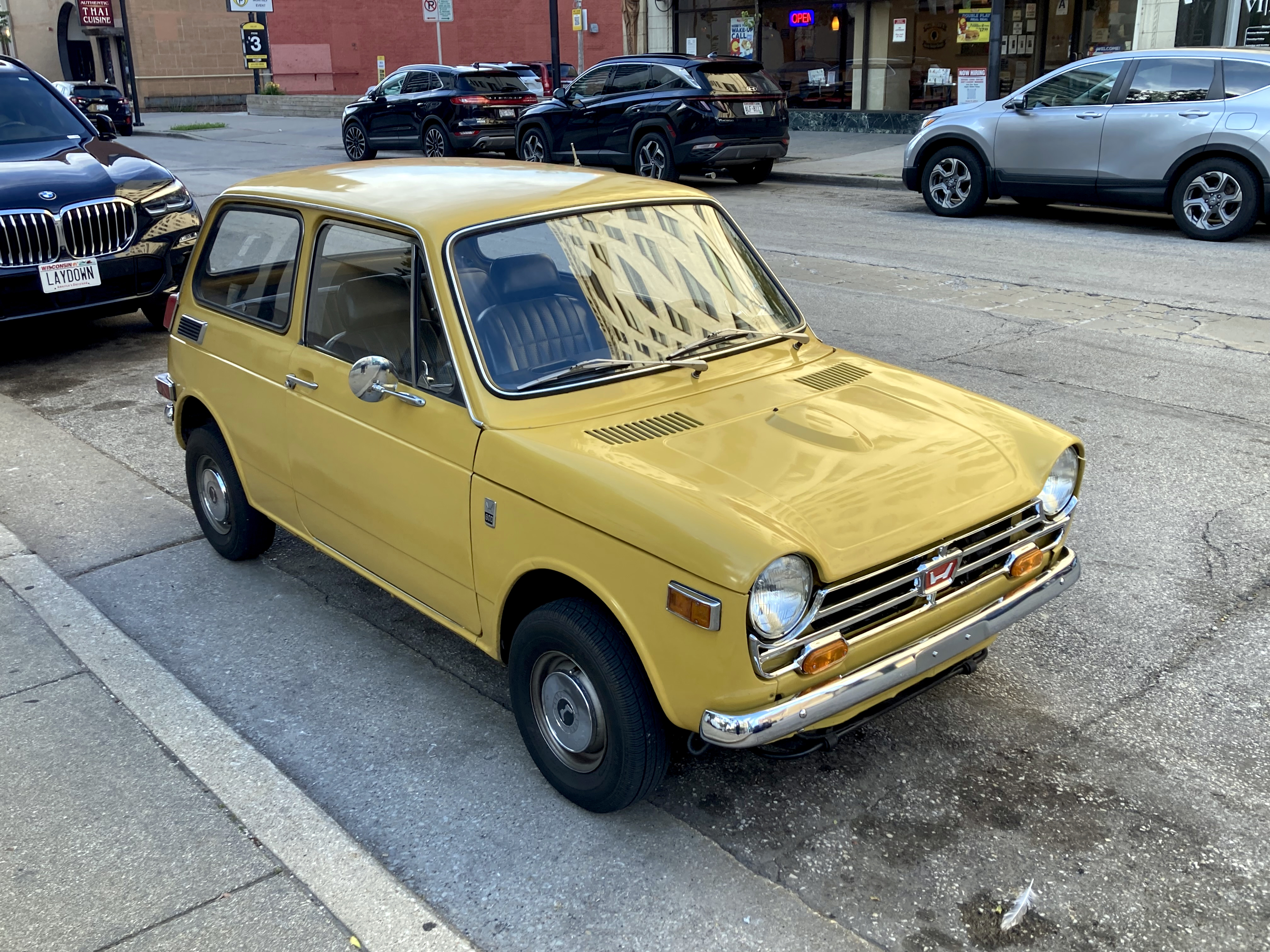
Honda N600

The larger-engined N600 was developed alongside the N360 in order to target export markets like the US and Europe, where motorways demanded higher top speeds. It was also briefly sold in the domestic Japanese market, however, where it went on sale in July 1968 as the N600E. Only 1,500 examples were sold until early 1969 when the N600 was discontinued in Japan; because of its larger engine it did not qualify for any of the tax and insurance breaks given to kei cars even though it was as small as one. The larger engine meant that the spare tire had to be moved from its usual position in the engine room to being underslung at the rear of the car.

Just seven months after road testing the N360, Britain's Motor magazine tested a Honda N600 in November 1968. They reported that it had a top speed of 77.1 mph (124.1 km/h) and could accelerate from 0-60 mph (97 km/h) in 19 seconds. An overall fuel consumption of 36.3 mpg_{‑imp} (7.8 L/100 km; 30.2 mpg_{‑US}) was achieved. The test car was priced in the UK at £589 including taxes, at a time when the Mini 850 was retailing for £561. The testers were impressed to find 1100 cc performance from a 600 cc car, but found it 'very noisy when extended'. They found the Honda as easy to drive and park, and 'quite well equipped'. The performance figures put the car at or near the top of its class under most criteria, reflecting its favourable power-to-weight ratio. The car was thus 5 mph (8 km/h) faster than the 72 mph (116 km/h) achieved by rival magazine Autocar in an N360 in May 1968, and more than ten seconds quicker to 0–60 mph (97 km/h) which the N360 achieved in 29.3 seconds. Consistent with its slower performance, the N360 squeezed 3 extra miles out of a (UK) gallon of fuel, managing an overall 39.4 mpg_{‑imp} (7.17 L/100 km; 32.8 mpg_{‑US}).

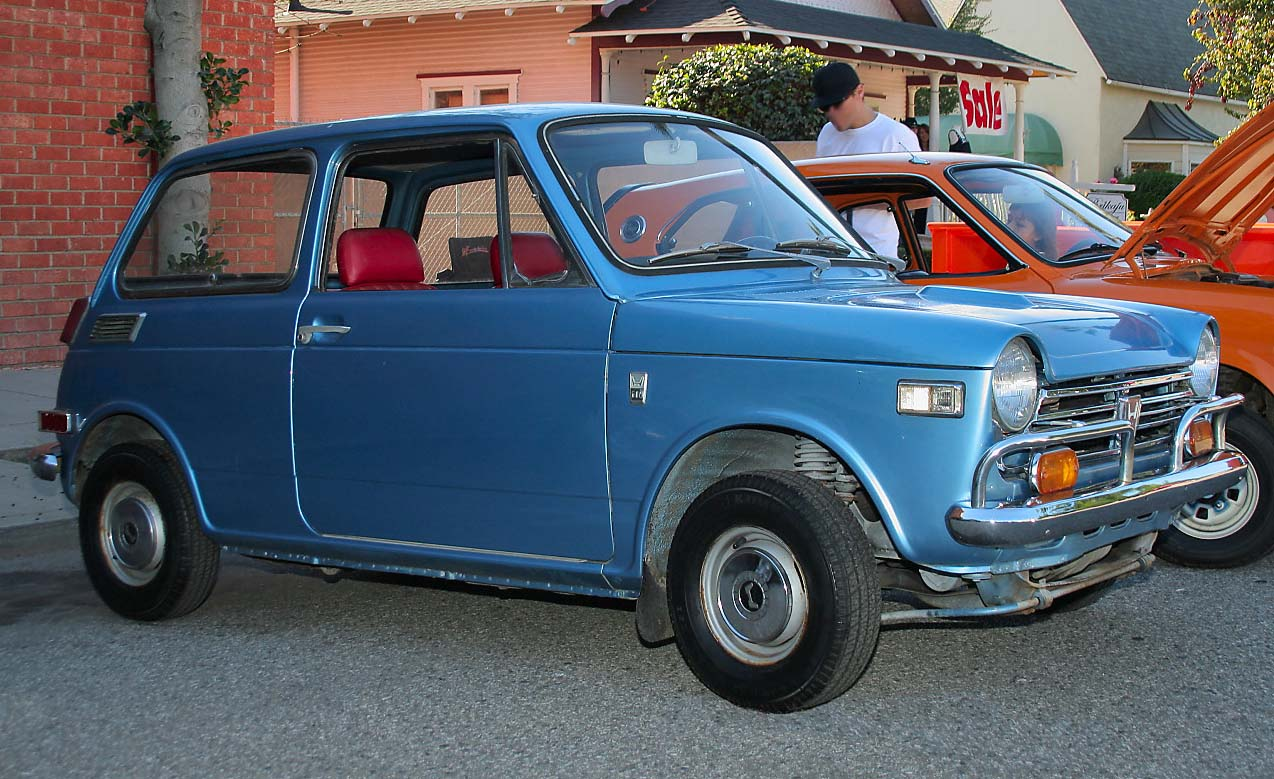
1970 Honda N600 (US)

The N600 was introduced to the United States as the 600 Sedan in 1969 as a 1970 model, and was the first Honda automobile to be officially exported to the United States by the Honda Motor Company (a small number of sports cars had been imported privately in years prior). Sales were originally limited to Hawaii, but cars were soon exported to the US West Coast by 1970. It was technologically advanced for its time, with an all alloy engine that could achieve 9000 rpm. Engine output was 36–45 hp (27–34 kW) and was capable of propelling the car to a top speed of 81 mph (130 km/h). The lower-powered engine arrived in 1972; with milder cams and lowered compression it gave up some peak power and torque, while allowing for a less peaky delivery and higher drivability. It delivered surprisingly peppy performance because of its light weight (around 550 kg/1100 pounds), due to compact dimensions and some plastic parts (like the boot lid). The brakes on early models were very weak, despite having front discs and servo assistance. Rear suspension was a dead axle on leaf springs.

The N600 (along with the TN360 kei truck), were the first Honda cars to be assembled outside Japan, with production in Taiwan by local joint venture Sanyang Industrial beginning in 1969. The N600 was called the Fu Gui, meaning 'Wealth' in Chinese (富貴).

US sales stopped in 1972, as did those of the sportier Honda Z600 (or Z, depending on country), after about 25,000 sales of the N600. 40,550 Zs and Ns were sold altogether in the United States. The first-generation Honda Civic replaced the N models.

=== Serial Number N600-1000001 ===
In September 1967, Honda offered their first automobile for the North American market, and they were exported to Los Angeles, California. Fifty pre-production left-hand-drive examples were sent as "winter test vehicles" and were only intended to be driven 20,000 mi (32,186.9 km) for endurance testing, then collected and crushed at a local scrapyard across the street from the American Honda 1960s headquarters. Four of the American pre-production vehicles still exist, and Serial Number N600-1000001, the first one manufactured, was discovered at a Japanese-specific car show in Long Beach, California, in 2015. At the request of American Honda, the car was extensively restored and unveiled at the same car show one year later, to be added to the American Honda Museum collection. The car was made part of the Petersen Automotive Museum collection in 2018. Honda documented the restoration in a series of videos.

== Legacy ==
Honda has paid tribute to the N360 with a number of modern vehicles, including:

- Honda EV-N concept, shown at Tokyo Motor Show 2009
- Honda N-One, introduced in 2012 as a modern kei-car homage to the N360
