= Honda EV Concept =

Motor vehicle by Honda

The Honda EV Concept vehicles are a series of two concept electric cars created by the automobile division of Honda, designed with cues to historical Honda products. The Urban EV Concept made its debut at the 2017 International Motor Show Germany in September 2017, while the Sports EV Concept debuted at the Tokyo Motor Show a month later.

== Common features ==
The front and rear ends feature screens that display messages to other motorists or the battery status. Other common styling details include the shape and configuration of the headlights, taillights, and front grille; matte black rub strips on the sides; and the blacked-out A pillars. The "Honda Automated Network Assistant" is a Honda-created artificial intelligence system that, according to Honda, "learns from the driver by detecting emotions behind their judgments."

== Urban EV ==
Honda Urban EV Concept
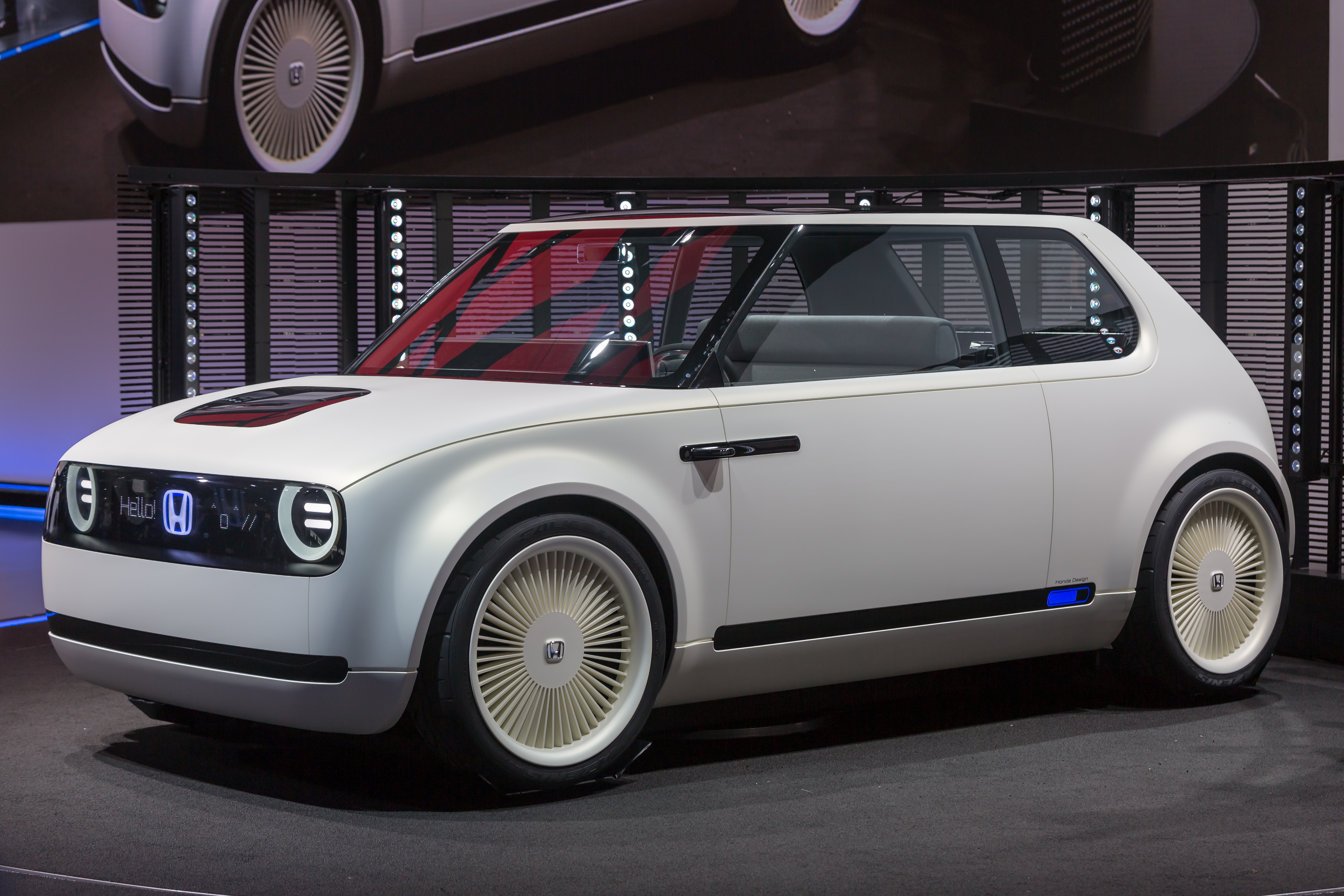

Overview
- Manufacturer: Honda
- Designer: Yuki Terai (exterior); Fumihiro Yaguchi (interior)

Body and chassis
- Class: Subcompact car (B)
- Body style: 3-door hatchback

Dimensions
- Length: 157.0 in (3,988 mm)

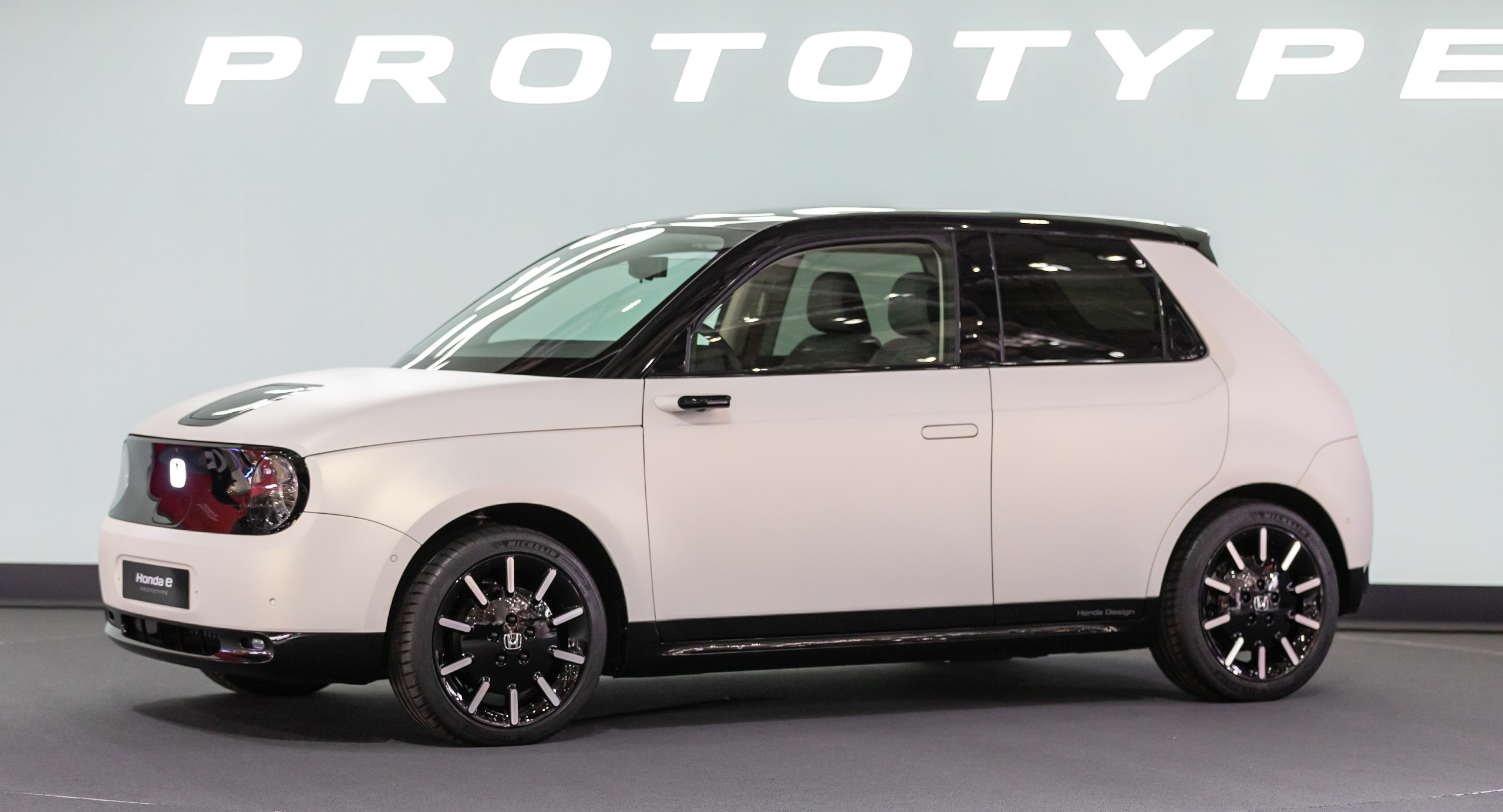
Prototype vehicle

Built on a new platform, the Urban EV Concept's exterior design is an homage to the first generation Honda Civic and is about the same length as the Honda Fit. The car features rear-hinged suicide doors. Yuki Terai is credited with the exterior design.

"We have come up with this cute-looking front, as well as simple and soft plane designs. Cars are becoming more high-tech, but they become friendlier to people," "We want to make these cars simple and easy to understand." Jun Goto, Sports EV Concept designer

The interior fits four adults, with the front passengers seated on a single bench seat. The dashboard is decorated in wood trim with a long digital screen as the instrument and infotainment panel. On the upper door panels are additional screens that display feeds from the side-view cameras. Fumihiro Yaguchi was the interior designer.

=== Production version ===
The production version of the Urban EV Concept is released in Europe later in 2019, and then was later released in Japan in 2020. The target market for the Urban EV Concept is as a short-range commuter. Because of its target as an urban commuting vehicle, a release in the United States is quite unlikely.

In February 2019, a pre-production prototype was unveiled, with the production version shown during the Geneva Motor Show and in May Honda announced the production vehicle to be named Honda e. Production and sales has started in late 2019.

== Sports EV ==
Honda Sports EV Concept
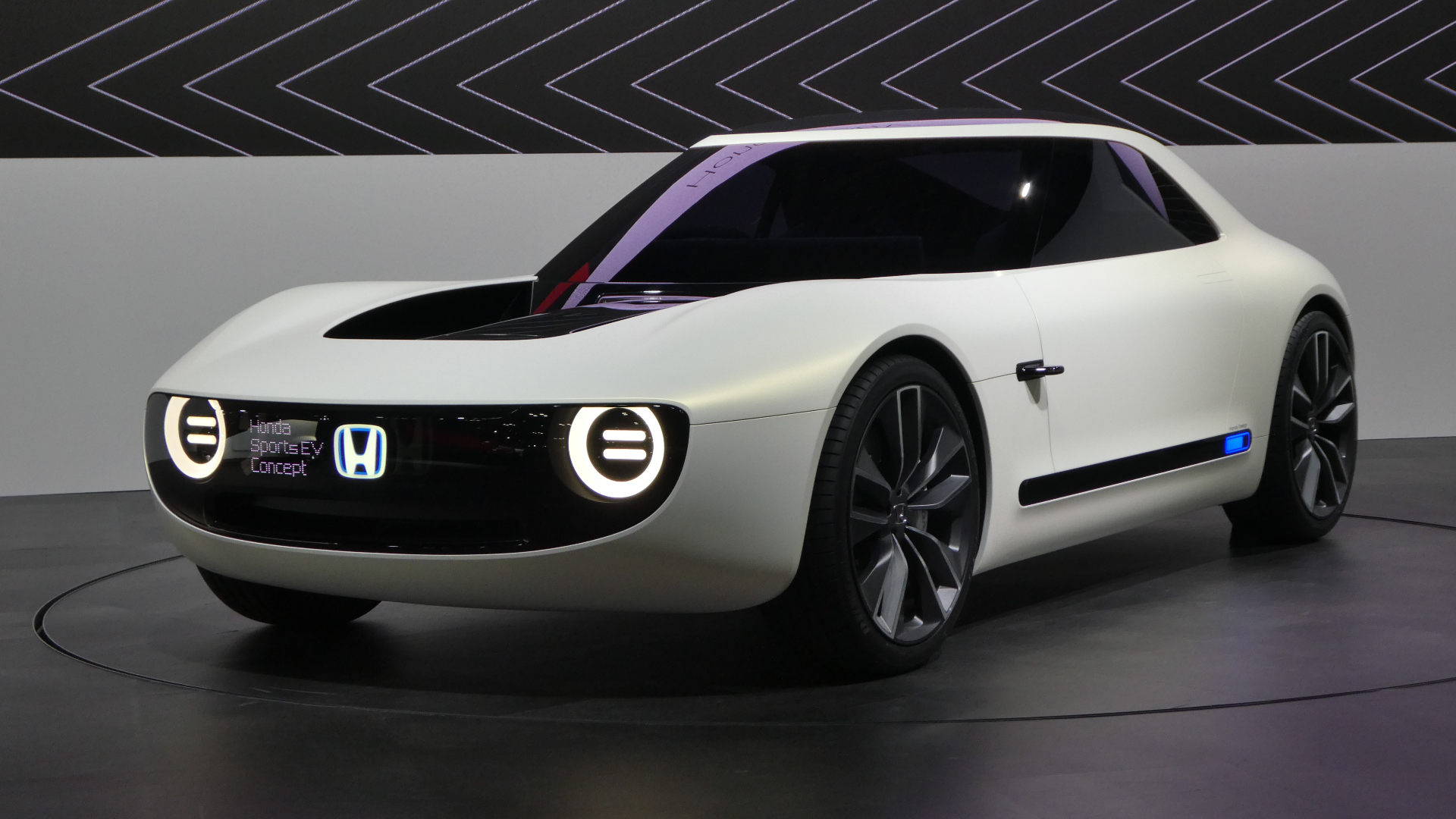

Overview
- Manufacturer: Honda
- Designer: Makoto Harada

Body and chassis
- Class: Sports car (S)
- Body style: 2-door fastback coupé

According to Honda, the Sports EV Concept "combine[s] EV performance and artificial intelligence inside a compact body with the aim to realize the joy of driving with a sense of unity with the car." Its exterior is inspired by the Honda S600. It shares the front and rear lights, as well as the dash, with the Urban EV. It features two seats and is meant to "embod[y] the 'beautility' of a sporty car." Due to the short six-month development schedule, the interior of the Sports EV shown at TMS 2017 was not finished.

Makoto Harada was the project leader and exterior designer of the concept.

== Awards ==
Automobile magazine awarded both cars with the 2018 Concept of the Year.

2018 Car Design Award ‘The Best Concept Car’
